= Filippo di Antonio Filippelli =

Italian painter

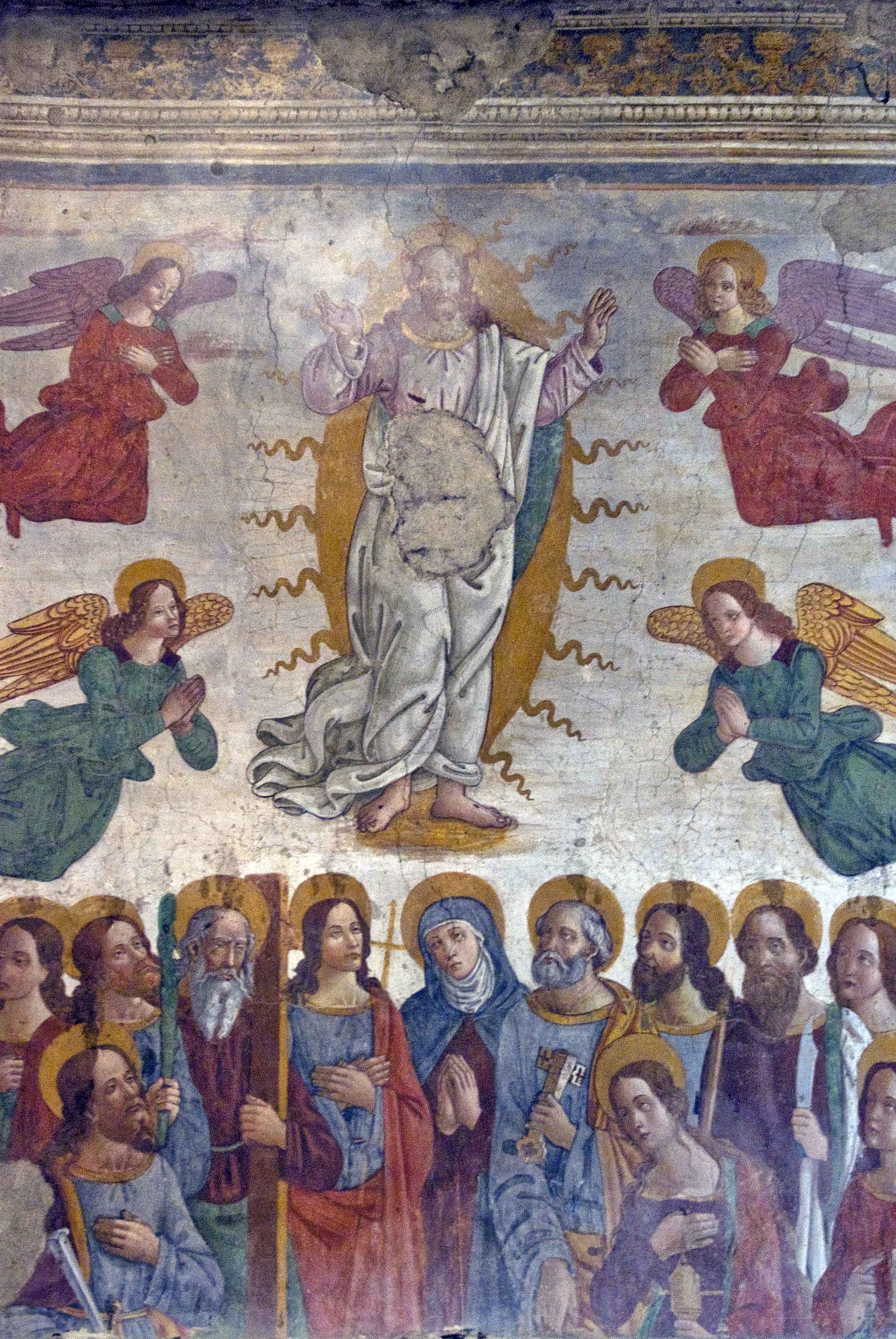
Ascension, church of Santa Maria a Marcialla

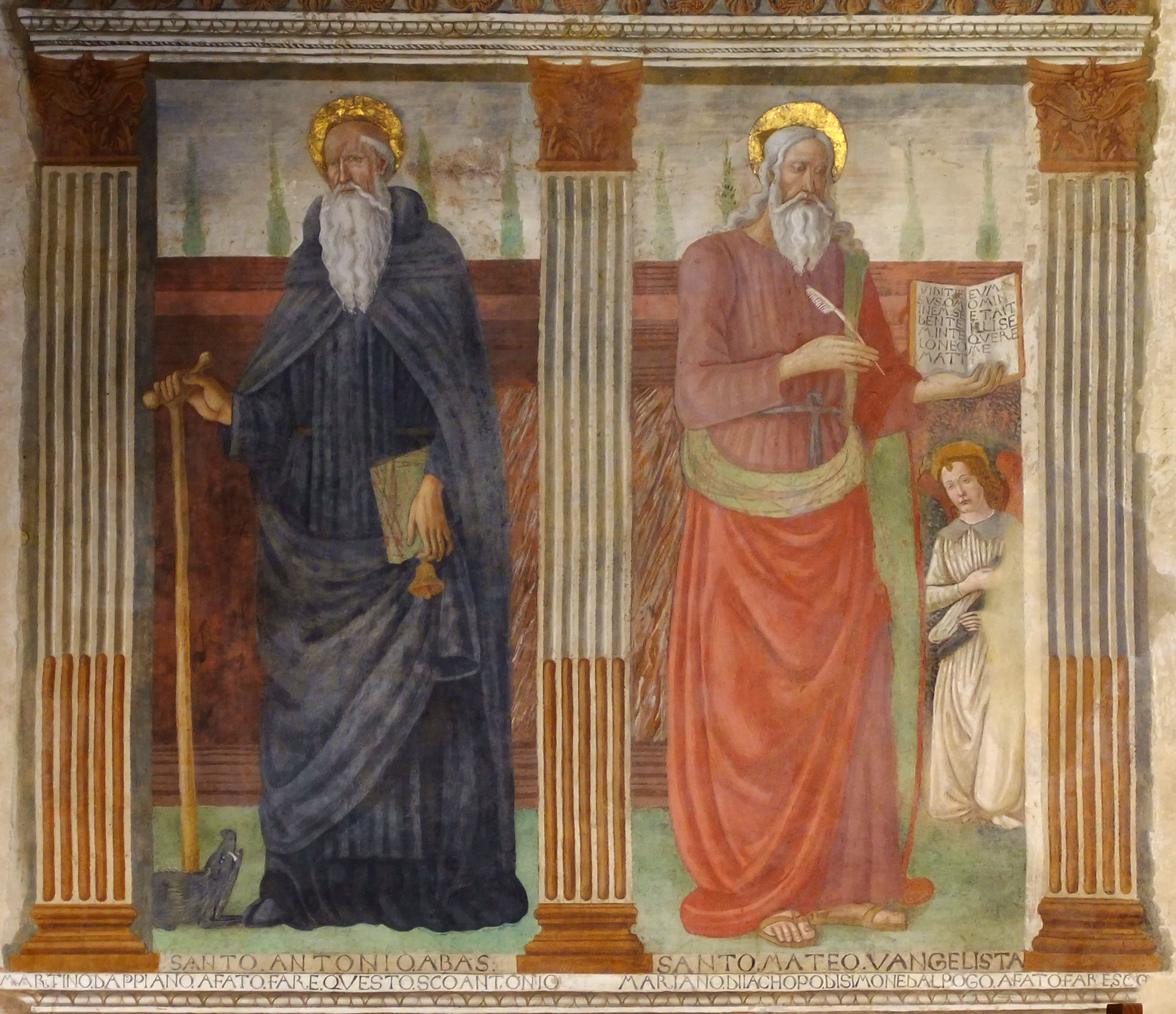
St Antony Abbot and St Matthew the Evangelist, frescoes in pieve di Sant'Appiano

Filippo di Antonio Filippelli (1460–1506) was an Italian Renaissance painter in Tuscany.

He was born in Badia a Passignano, near Tavarnelle Val di Pesa, where he was a pupil of the Florentine painter Bernardo di Stefano Rosselli. His style recalls that of Domenico Ghirlandaio, who also worked at Passignano.

Filippelli was active primarily as a fresco painter. He painted many frescoes for churches in the countryside surrounding Florence. These include:

- Saint Peter Martyr, Saints Anthony Abbot and Saint Matthew, and the Martyrdom of Saint Sebastian, dated 1484, at the Pieve di Sant'Appiano near Barberino Val d'Elsa.
- Scenes from the Life of Saint Benedict, frescoed between 1483 and 1485 in the cloister of the Abbey of Saint Michael at Badia a Passignano.
- Madonna and Child with Four Saints, a trompe l'oeil altarpiece dated 1492 in church of Sant'Andrea a Papaiano, Poggibonsi.
- The Ascension of Christ and The Annunciation, 1502, in the church of Santa Maria a Marcialla near Barberino Val d'Elsa.
- Madonna and Child with Saints Antony Abbot and Lucy, fragments of a fresco from the Pieve di Santa Maria a Coeli Aula, now at the Museo d'arte sacra di Montespertoli

== Bibliography ==
- AA.VV. (1988). edizioni Italcards, Bologna (ed.). Badia a Passignano. AA.VV., Badia a Passignano.
- Anna Padoa Rizzo (2002). Pacini Editore, Ospedaletto (ed.). Iconografia di San Giovanni Gualberto. Edizioni Vallombrosa. ISBN 88-7781-418-7.
- Pons, Nicoletta. “Il pittore Filippo d’Antonio Filippelli e la sua attività fra Valdelsa e Valdipesa (parte 1),” Antichità Viva, XXX, nos. 4-5 (1991): pp. 5–13.
- Pons, Nicoletta. “Il pittore Filippo d’Antonio Filippelli e la sua attività fra Valdelsa e Valdipesa (parte 2),” Antichità Viva, XXXI, no. 1 (1992): pp. 23–28.
