= I Balzini =

Italian wine estate

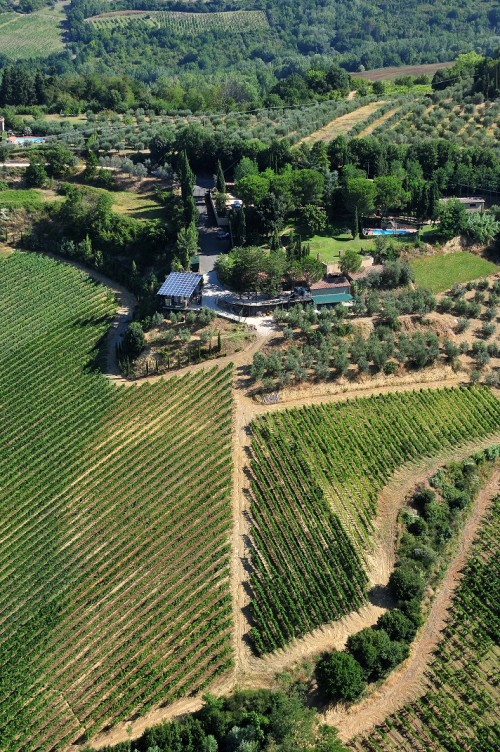
I Balzini Estate

I Balzini D'Isanto is a wine estate in Italy, producing a Super Tuscan (wine), classified IGT (Indicazione Geografica Tipica), an official Italian classification designating the region of origin, rather than grape varieties or wine styles, allowing the use of foreign grape varieties to be added. The estates is owned by the D'Isanto family since 1980. The name "I Balzini" comes from the word "balze", the local name for the small terraces planted with vines.

== History ==
The estate is in village of Barberino Val d'Elsa in the heart of Tuscany on the borders of the provinces of Florence and Siena. Surrounded with many important historic sites such as the former castle of Semifonte, destroyed during the period of the Communes in Florence. The octagonal chapel, a scale copy of Brunelleschi's Florentine dome, still looms over the surrounding countryside today. In 1980, the property of I Balzini was purchased by Vincenzo D'Isanto. Although vines almost certainly already existed on the site, around 1980, Vincenzo D'Isanto planted the majority of the vineyard.

== Vineyard ==
The vineyard, 250 meters above sea-level, covers over 7 hectares and consists of the hills around the estate and 2 hectares in the neighbouring Barberino Val d'Elsa village. The grape variety are Merlot, and Cabernet Sauvignon, Sangiovese and Mammolo. The soil is of sedimentary Pliocene origin, characterized by slit yellow sand layered with clay strata, and large amounts of marine fossils. The microclimate is characterized by considerable temperature swings between the day and the night, which increase during the harvest period. Harvest, based on traditional techniques and strict control of yields, is carried out by hand all through the year. The careful use of organic fertilizers, environmentally sustainable packaging and renewable energy allow the vines to reach an advanced age.

== The Cellar ==
Grapes from each plot are fermented in separate vats in order to preserve the identity of the terroir on which the grapes have ripened. Upon completion of alcoholic fermentation, the wines are tasted before being drawn off to the fine wine vats. The wine is transferred by batches into barrels with a special “toasting” suited to the characteristics of the wine. Blending takes place after the first racking of the barrels. Then the ageing phase of the wine begins in the cellar, which takes between 18 and 20 months.. The wine is then left to rest in glass for at least a year to reach its maximum balance and expression of its best qualities. They are sold in the fourth year from harvesting. I Balzini Green Label, being a fresh and young product, is refined one year in stainless steel tanks at controlled temperature and sold one year after the harvesting. I Balzini Red Label is aged 24 months in old barriques and refined around 18 months in bottle.

== See also ==
- Tuscan wine
- Italian wine
- IGT
