= Passignano =

Passignano may refer to:

- Passignano sul Trasimeno, a comune in the Province of Perugia, Italy
- Badia di Passignano, an abbey in Tavarnelle Val di Pesa
- Domenico Passignano (1559–1638), Italian painter
