= Badia di Passignano =

Church building in Tavarnelle Val di Pesa, Italy

Coordinates: 43.5773°N 11.2475°E

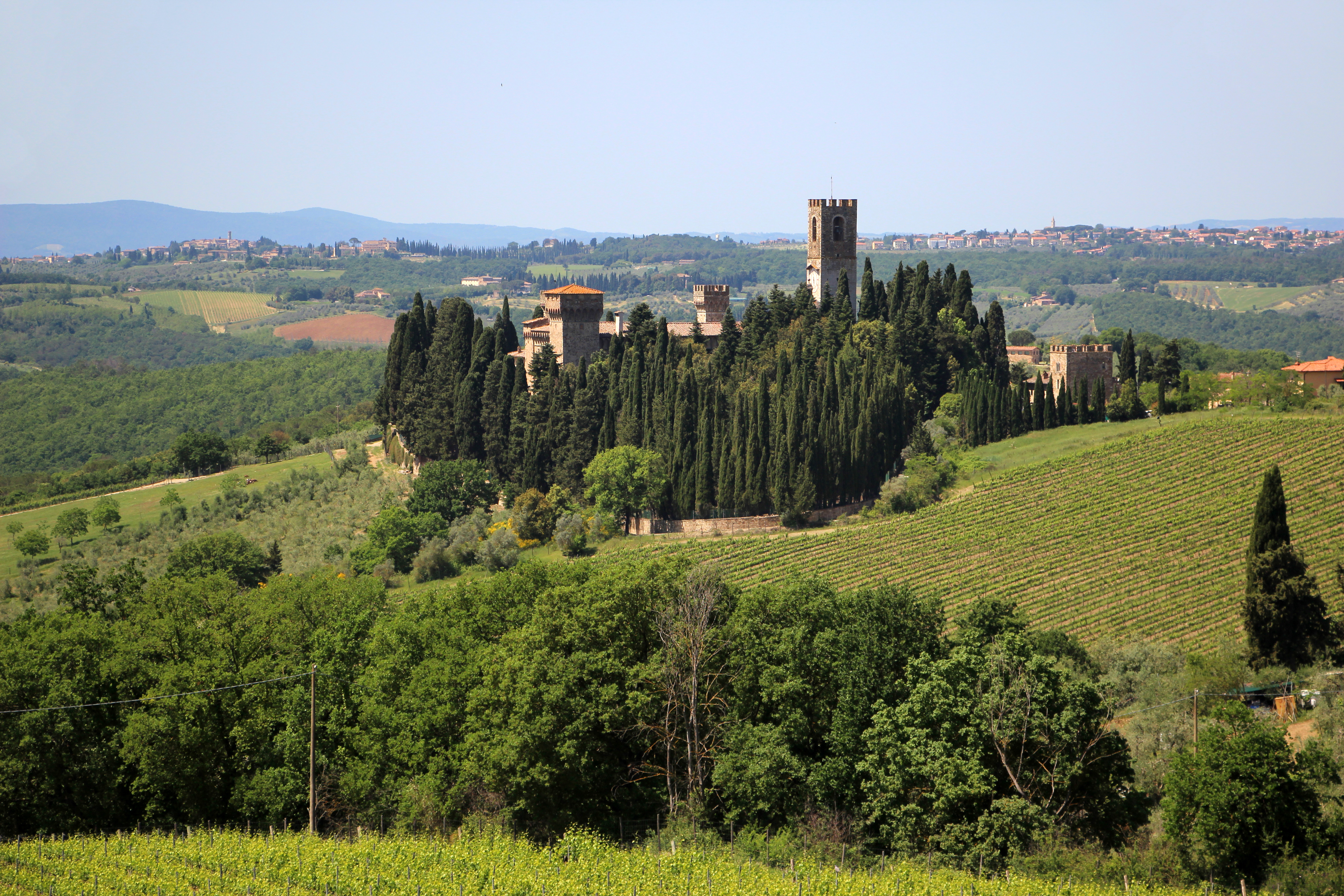
Badia a Passignano

The Badia a Passignano, also called the Abbey of San Michele Arcangelo a Passignano, is a historic Benedictine abbey located atop a scenic hilltop, surrounded by cypresses, east of the town of Tavarnelle Val di Pesa, Province of Florence, Italy. The abbey complex is located about 2 kilometres east of the Siena-Florence autostrada. The settlement is also a frazione of Barberino Tavarnelle.

== History ==
Documents citing the abbey date to the 890s during the Lombard era. In the year 1049, a prior hermitage was donated to John Gualbert, the founder of the Vallombrosan Order. The abbey became one of the major sites of the order and itself a wealthy landowner by the mid-14th century. Refurbished and altered over the centuries, in 1866 the monks were expelled and the site was sold to private owners, one of whom created some of the faux crenellations and towers. In the 20th century, the abbey was restored to the Vallombrosan monks, who still inhabit the abbey today.

Outside of the cloistered abbey complex is the Romanesque 12th-century church of San Michele Arcangelo; the church has undergone numerous reconstructions. In the attached small hamlet of Passignano is the parish church of San Biagio, built in 1080. The abbey in the 19th-century housed a remarkable collection of over 6000 parchment manuscripts, many brought here by Grand-Duke Leopold.

The abbey is known for a number of frescoes, created by artists over a number of centuries, including works by Filippo di Antonio Filippelli, Benedetto Veli, Alessandro Pieroni, Alessandro Allori, Bernardo di Stefano Rosselli, Giuseppe Nicola Nasini, and Domenico Passignano.

The refectory houses frescoes by Domenico Ghirlandaio and his brother Davide. The frescoes have been much restored over the last century.

== Gallery of Frescoes ==
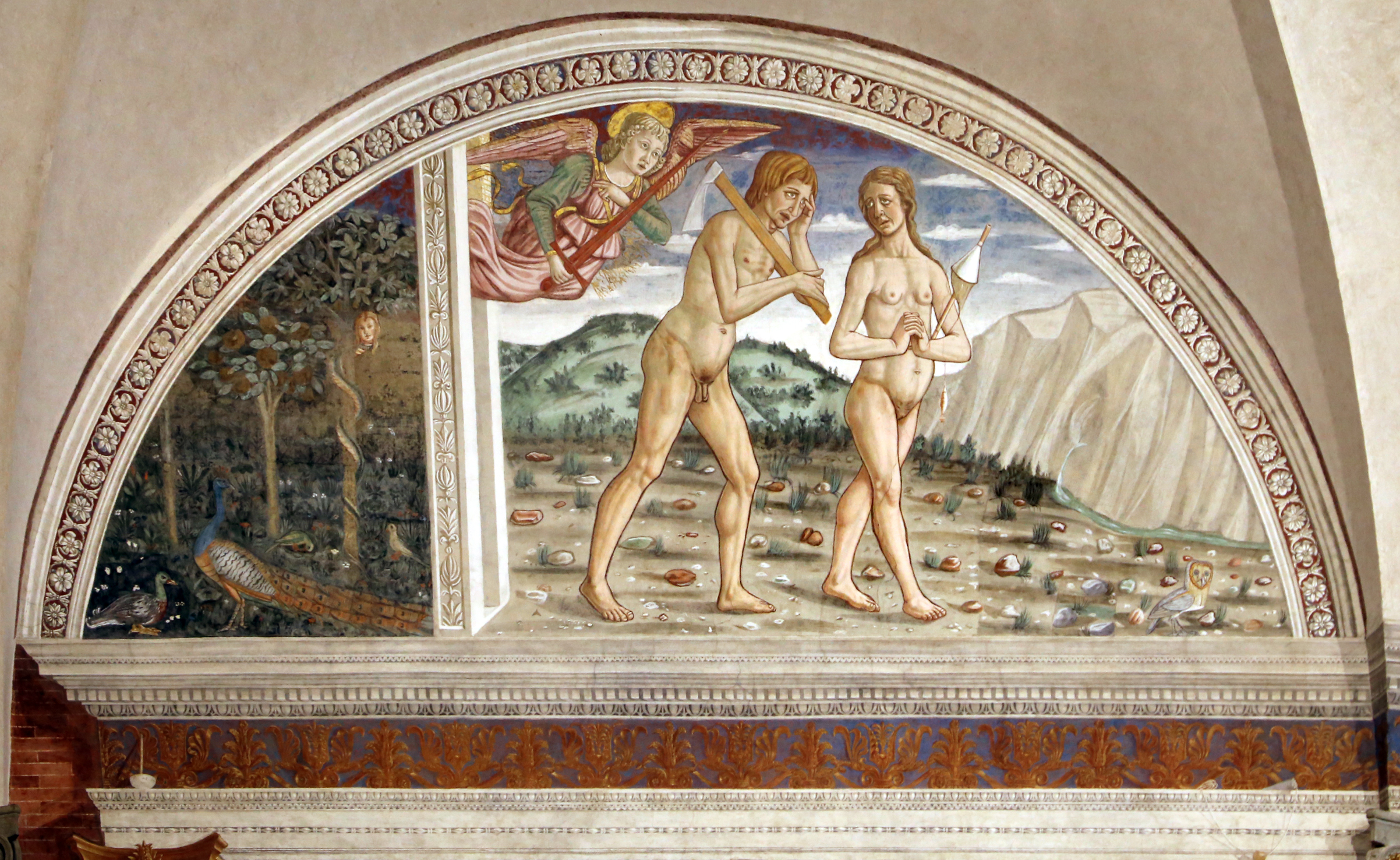
Expulsion from Paradise by Bernardo di Stefano Rosselli

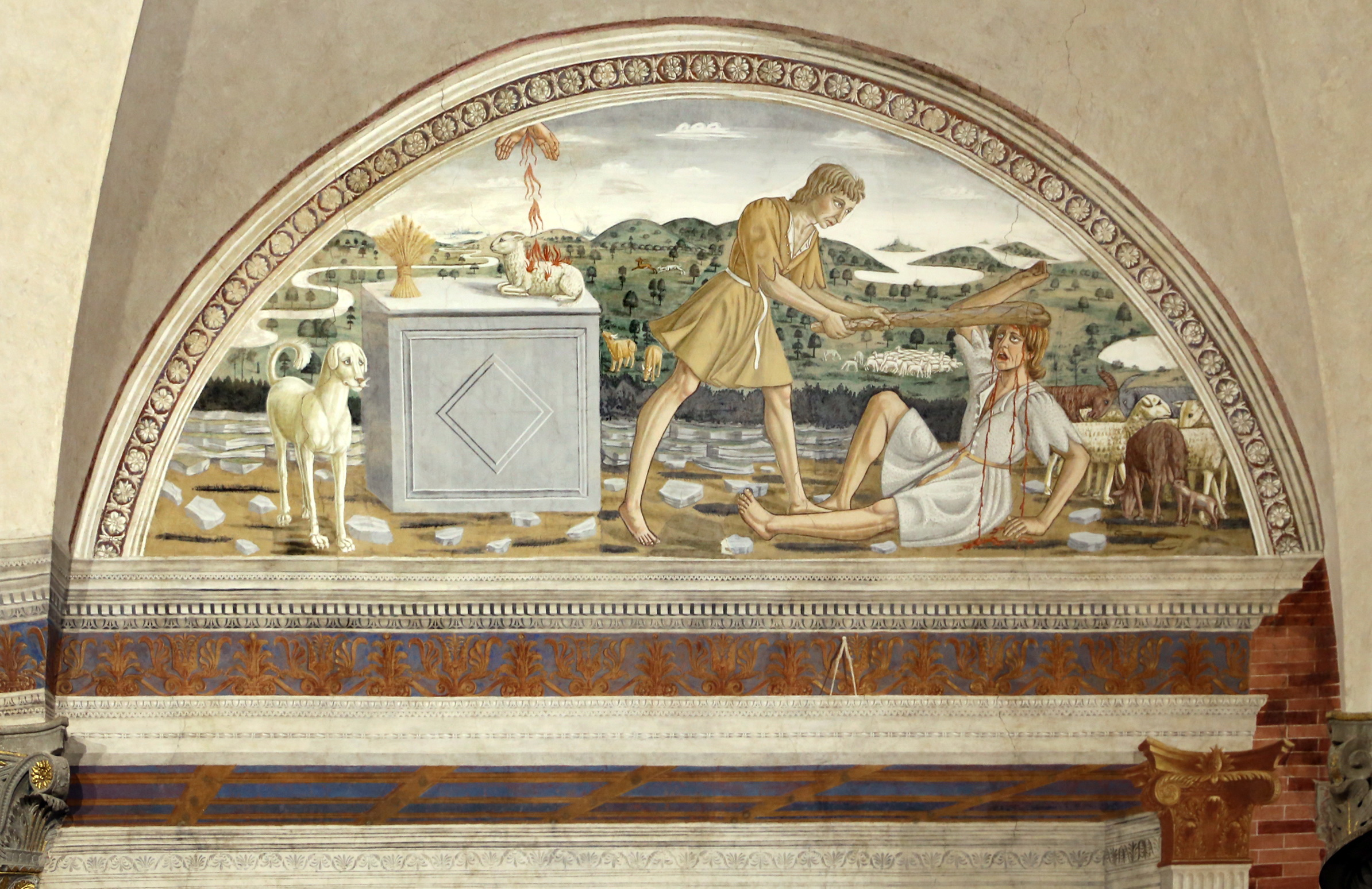
Cain and Abel by Bernardo di Stefano Rosselli

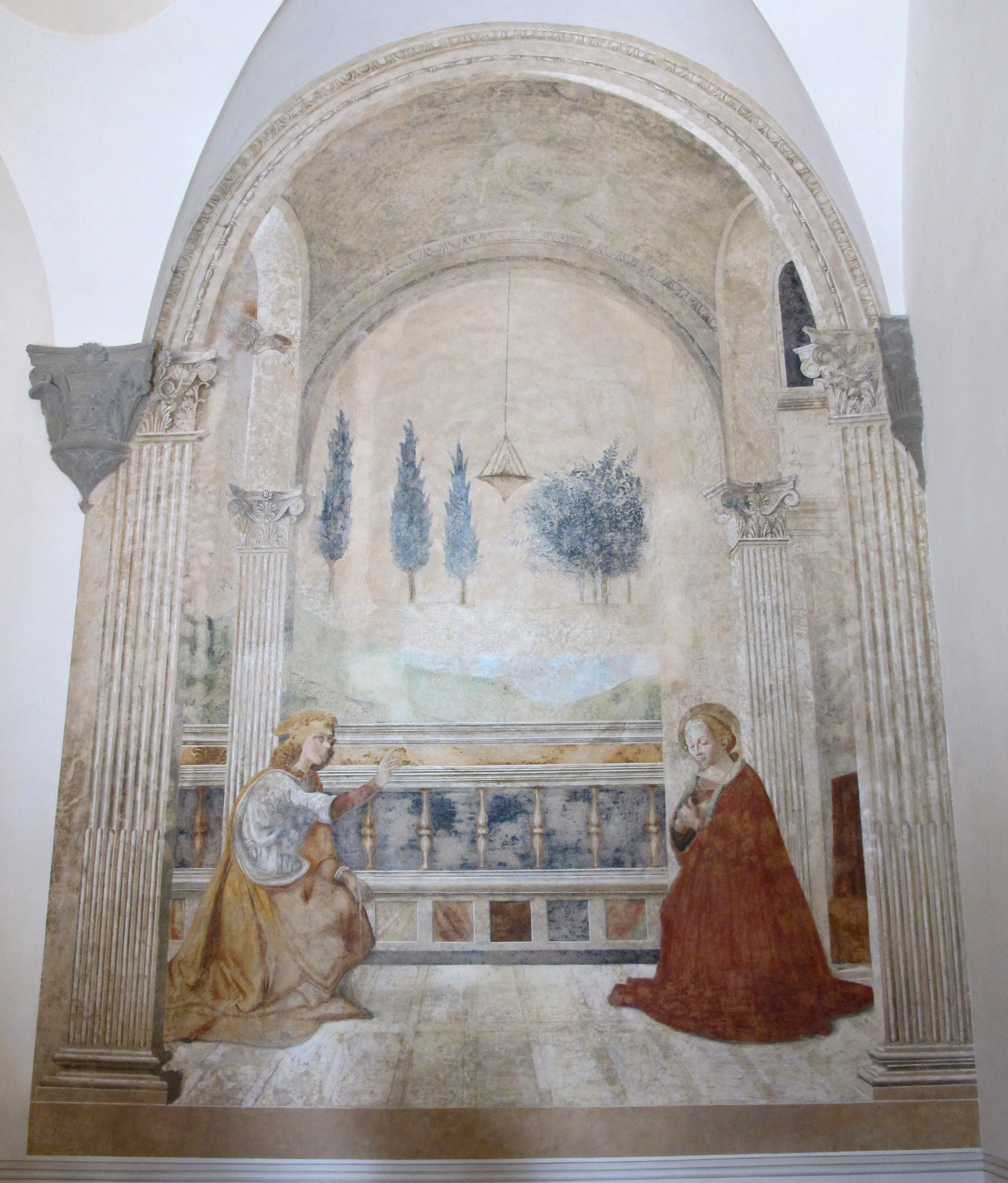
Annunciation by Filippo di Antonio Filippelli

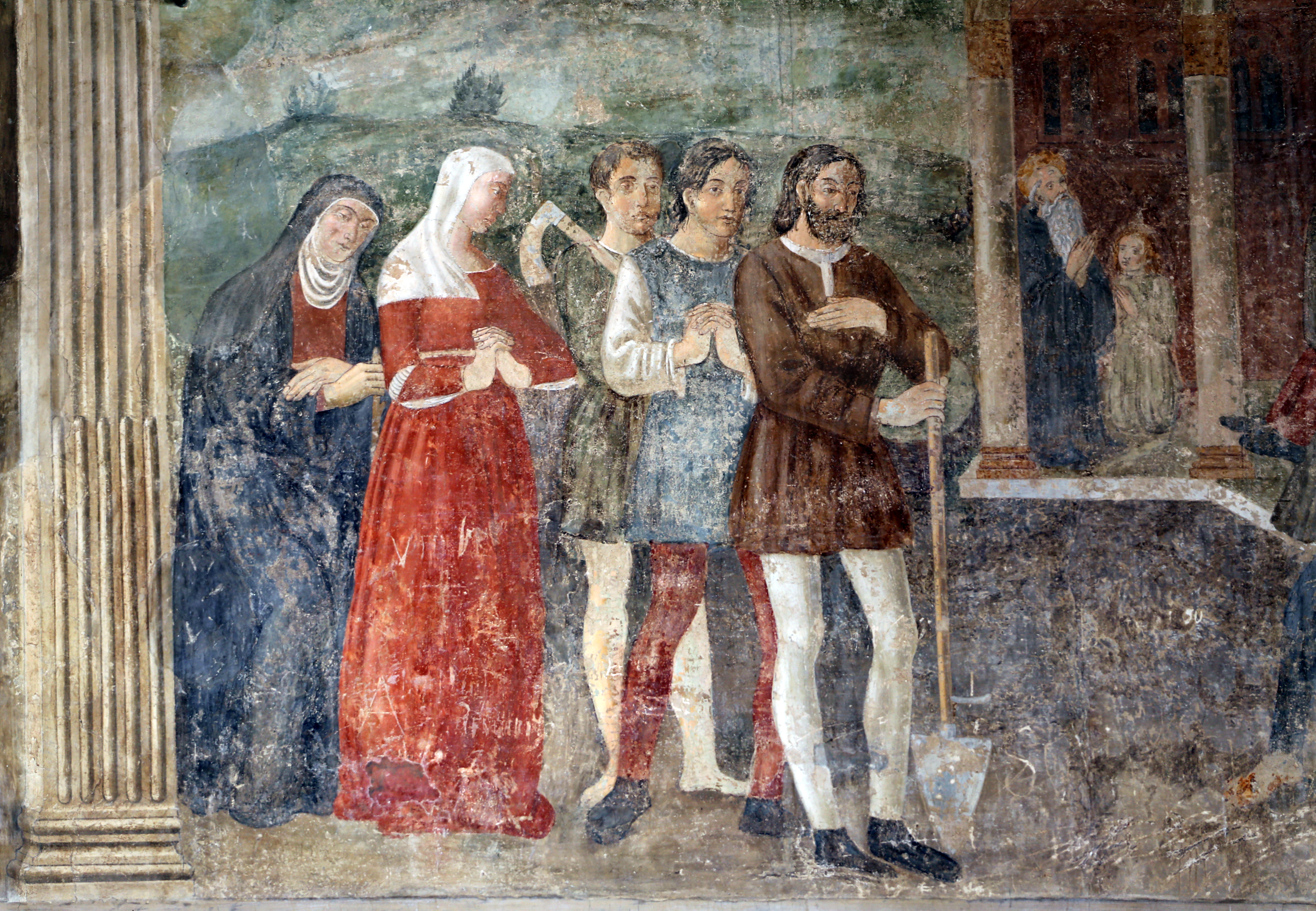
Life of St Benedict by Filippo di Antonio Filippelli

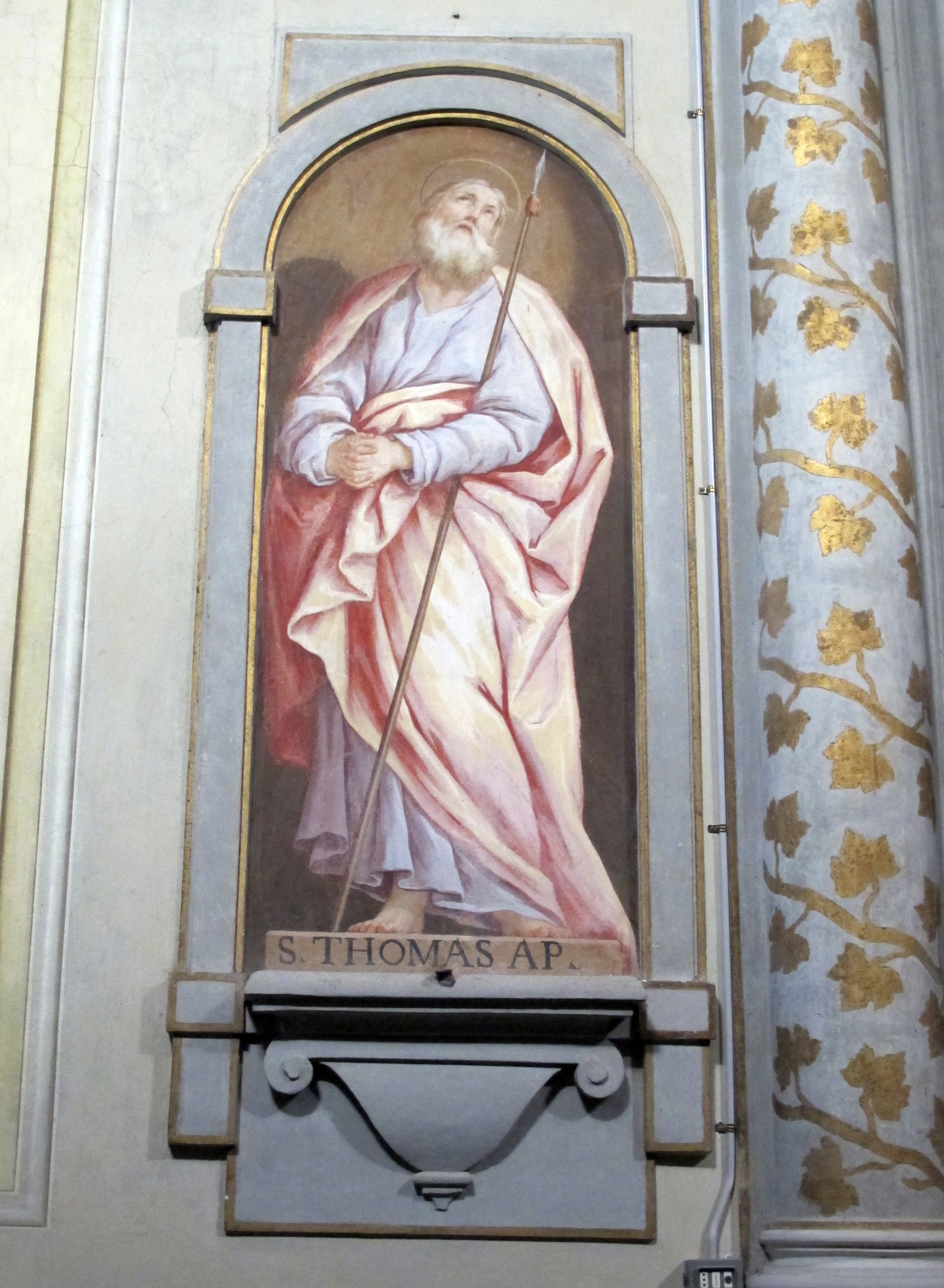
From series of Apostles by Giuseppe Nicola Nasini

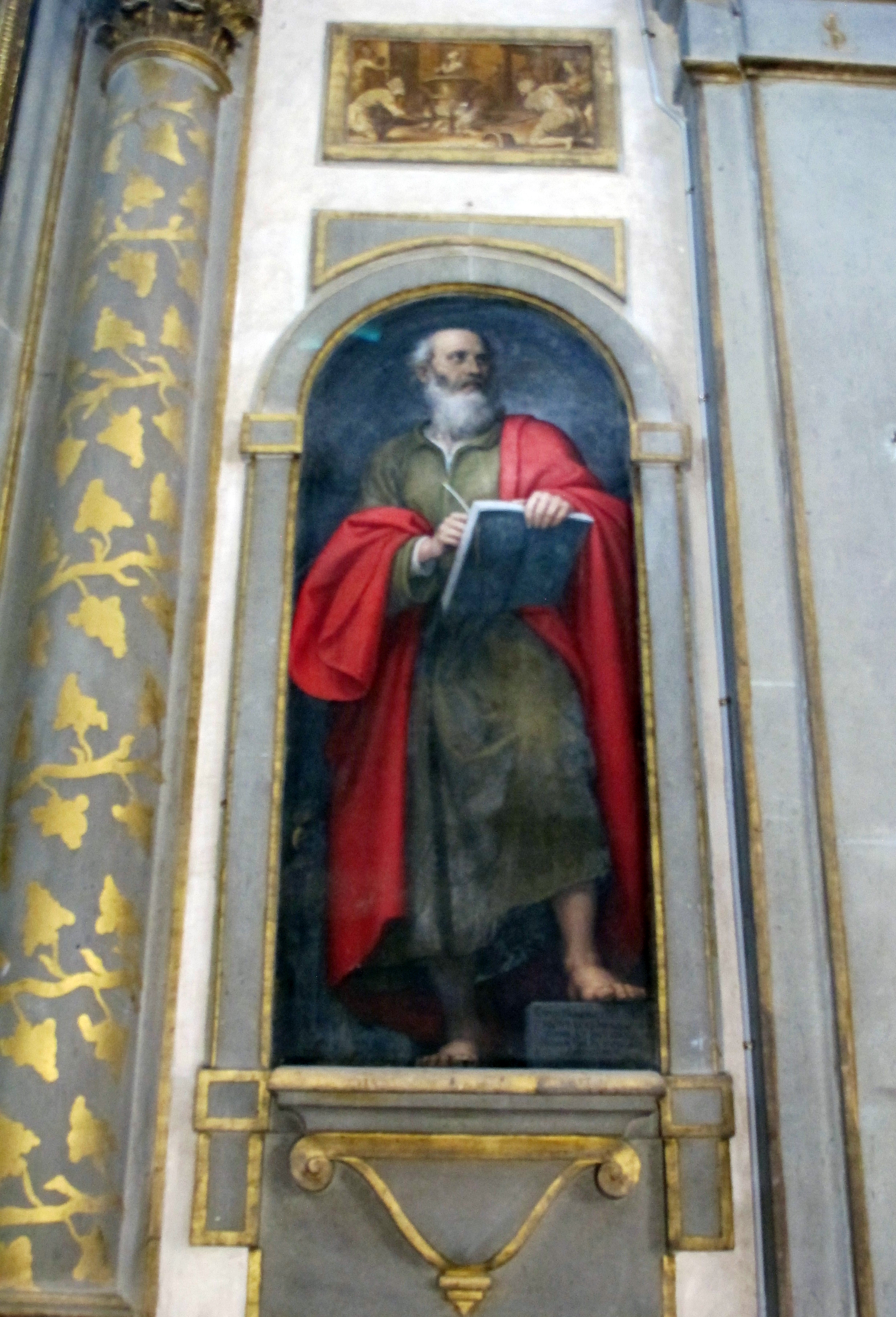
From series of Apostles by Passignano

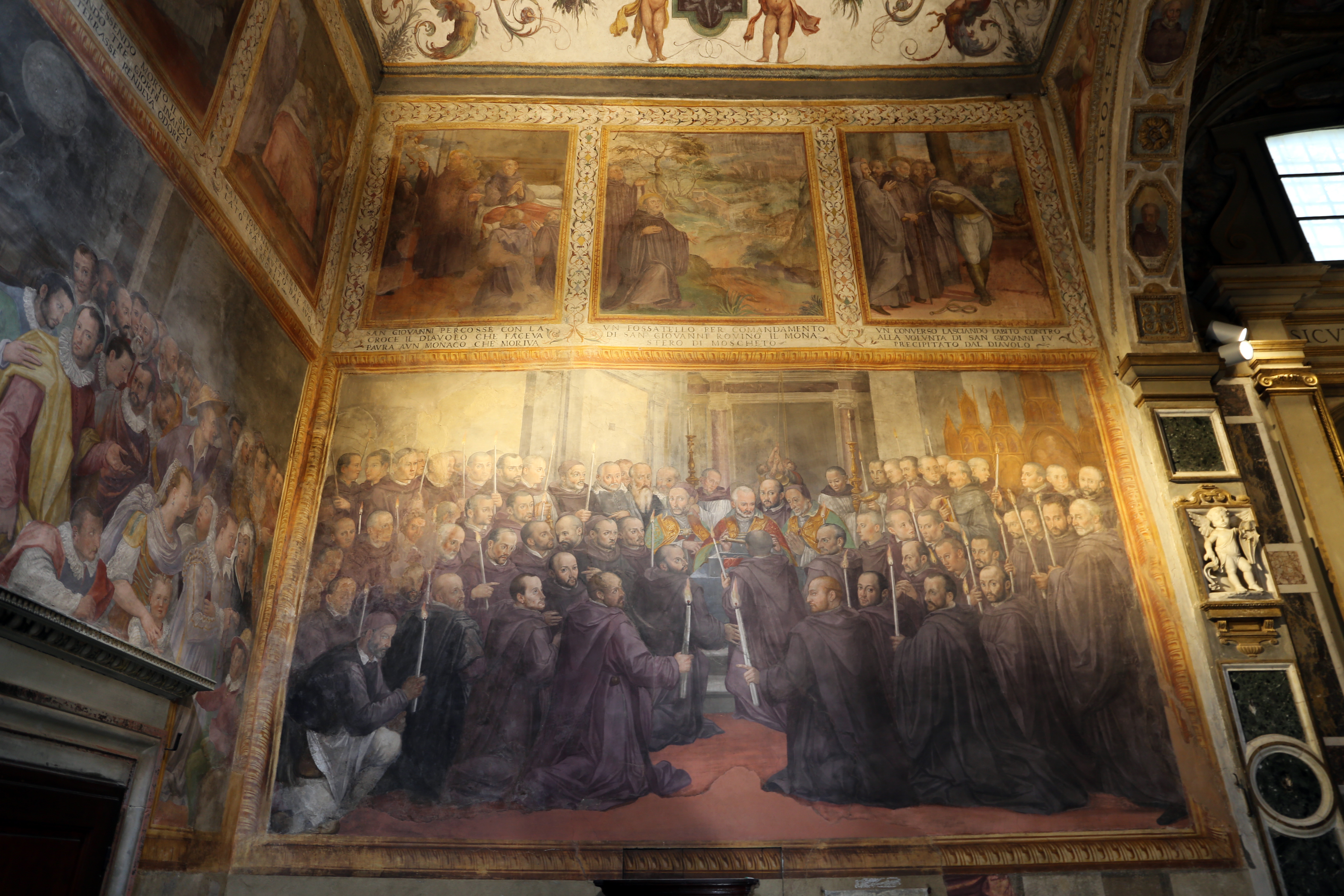
Recognition of the Relics of St Giovanni Gualberto by Alessandro Allori

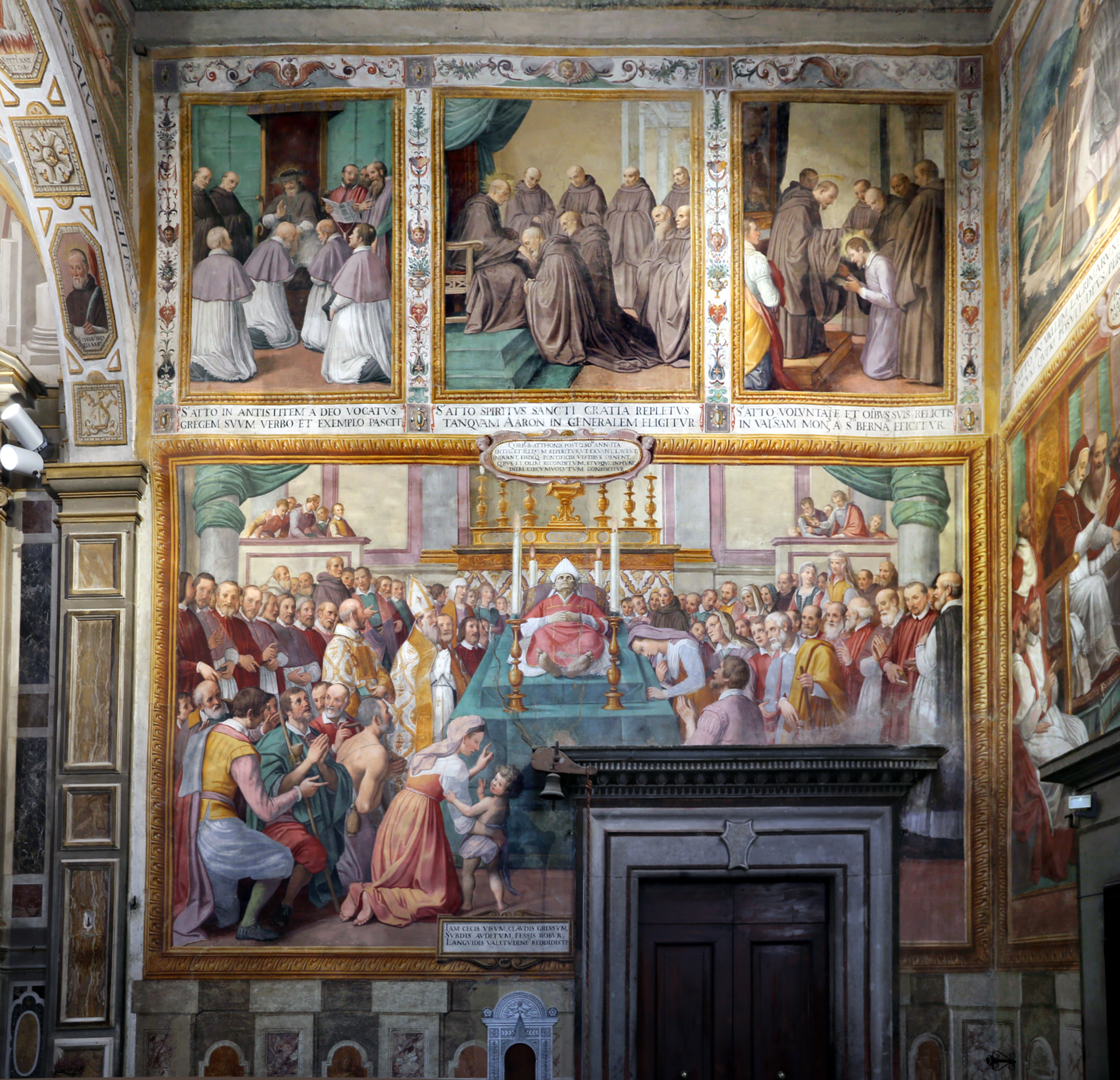
Death of St Atto of Pistoia by Benedetto Veli

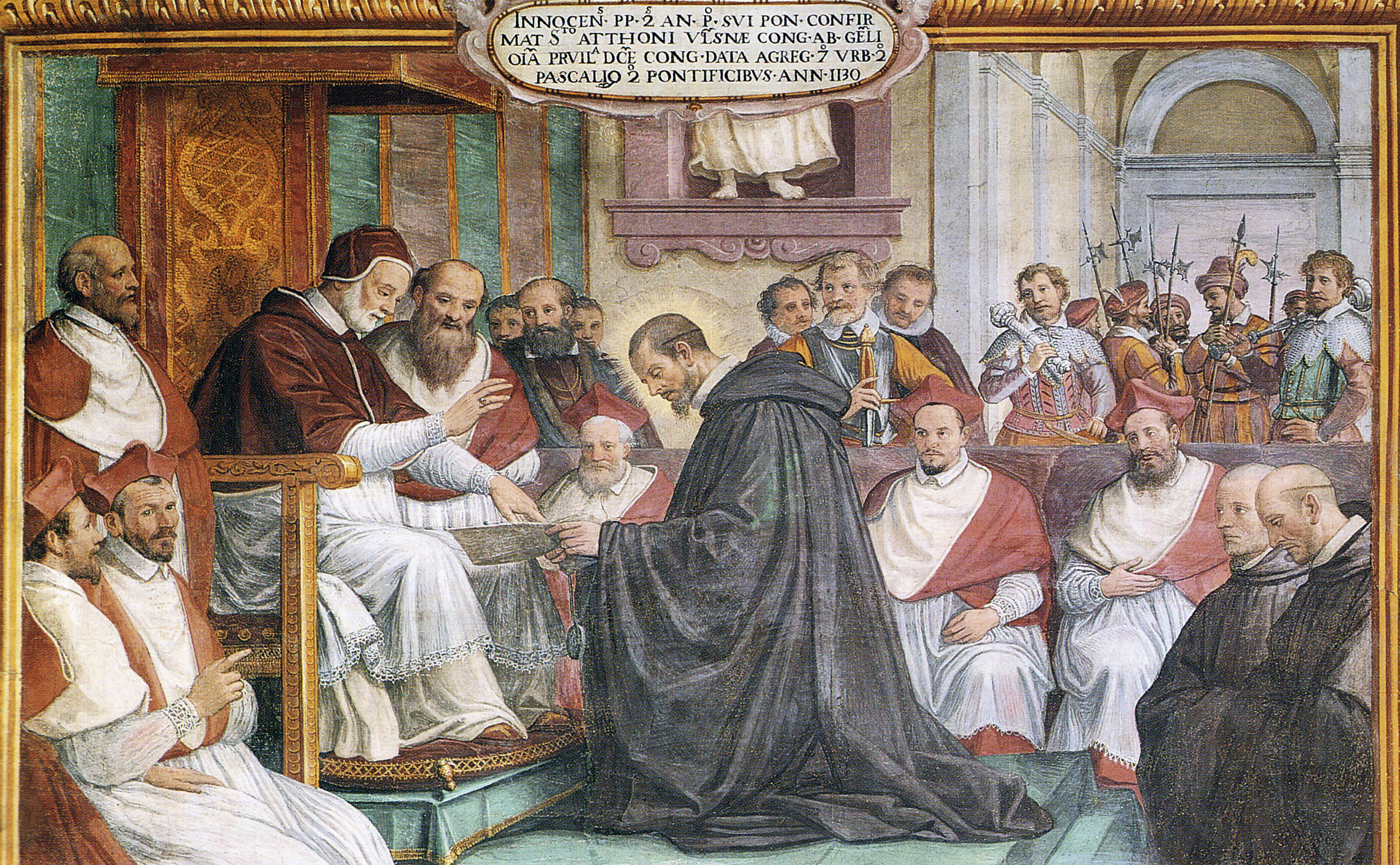
St Atto before Pope by Benedetto Veli

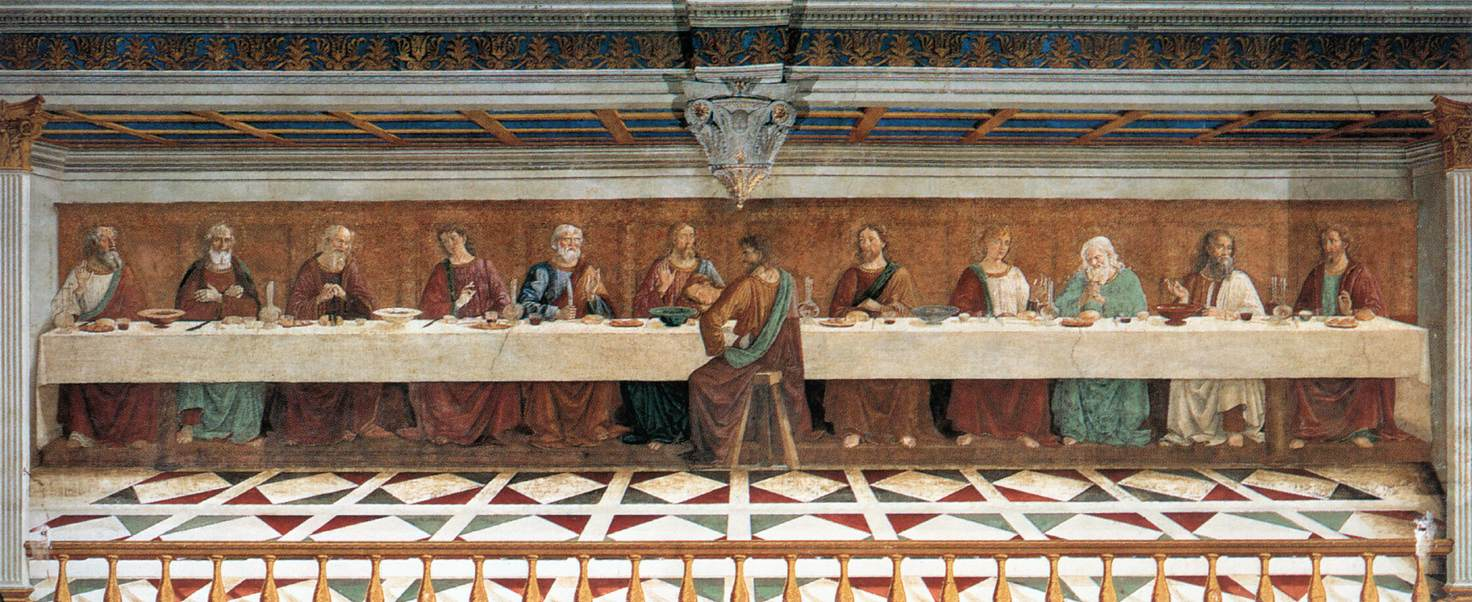
Last Supper by Ghirlandaio

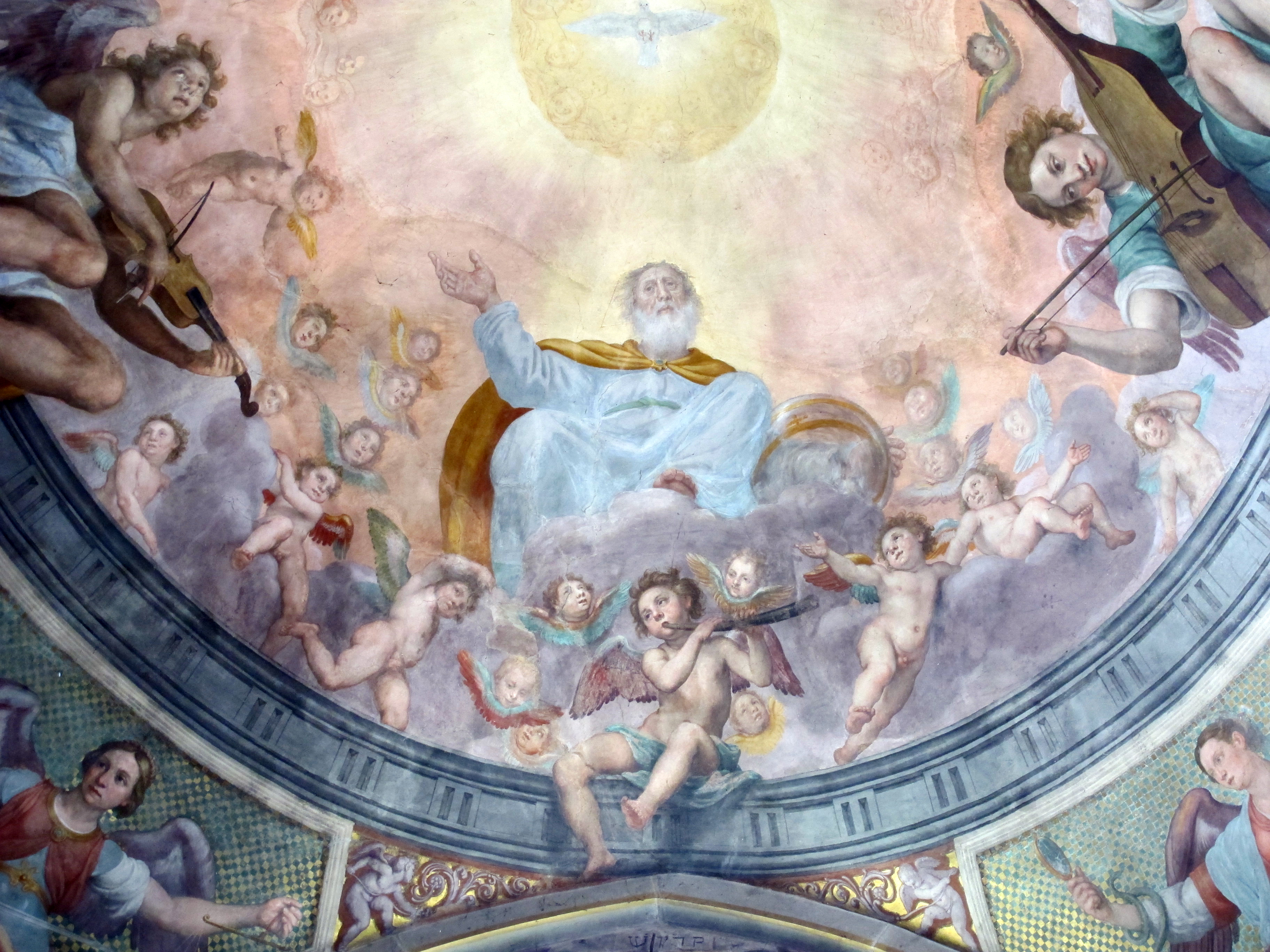
Dome frescoes by Passignano
