= Biagio Guasconi =

Florentine politician (1385–1449)

Biagio Guasconi (7 June 1385 – 1449) was a Florentine politician who held a variety of political, military, and diplomatic positions in Florence. After his ally Rinaldo degli Albizzi revolted against Cosimo de' Medici and rose to power in 1433, Guasconi achieved a more prominent role in the government and was entrusted with a number of diplomatic missions with figures such as the Holy Roman Emperor Sigismund and Pope Eugene IV. After the Medici returned to power in 1434, Guasconi was disgraced; he was exiled to Ancona, where he died in 1449.

== Biography ==
Guasconi was born in Florence on 7 June 1385. He was one of eight children born to Iacopo Guasconi, who held various political offices in Florence, and Albiera di Filippo Baroncelli. Guasconi had a classical education and was connected to the humanist movement, which was developing in Florence at that time. Guasconi's first appearance in politics was on a document dated 4 July 1408; in it, he offered an unnamed family member as a hostage to guarantee the safe passage of Pope Gregory XII as he departed Lucca. He was one of twelve Florentines to do so following negotiations between Florence and Gregory XII. Guasconi assumed his first political office on 10 September 1413, becoming the Abundance of Grain and Fodder Official; he became the Meats Official on 1 July 1415. He was an attendee of the Council of Constance.

In 1419, Guasconi married Nanna di Gioacchino Mazzinghi, a member of a powerful family in Florence; he also became a gonfalonier of the companies, or a militia commander, the same year. In the early 1420s, Guasconi assumed various important political offices: he became podesta of San Gimignano in 1420 and a capitano del popolo in 1422. The Signoria of Florence sent him to Bologna as a diplomat in January 1424. By May of that year, he had begun meeting with the future Holy Roman Emperor Sigismund to solicit what would later become the Council of Basel; he returned to Florence in October. Guasconi continued to occupy a wide array of public offices following his diplomatic mission. He acted as the Consul of the Arte della Lana in 1425 and 1431; the podesta of Borgo San Lorenzo in 1427 and of Mangona in 1430; the Consul of the Sea in 1431; and the head of the Florentine Studio.

As a result of Rinaldo degli Albizzi's revolt against Cosimo de' Medici and subsequent rise to power in 1433, Guasconi, an ally of Albizzi, achieved a more prominent role in the government. He was entrusted with a number of diplomatic missions, convening with figures such as Sigismund, Pope Eugene IV, Guidobaldo da Montefeltro, and Niccolò da Tolentino. Just before Sigismund's coronation as Holy Roman Emperor, Guasconi was chosen to deliver an oration, perhaps aiming to restore positive relations between Sigismund and Florence. During this period, he also held several positions in the military. In March or April 1434, Guasconi was allegedly part of a conspiracy to assassinate ten politicians loyal to the Medicis, though they never carried out this plan.

When the Albizzi government was toppled and the Medici regained power in Florence in October 1434, Guasconi was disgraced. He was subject to a twenty-year ban from political activity, confiscation of his property, and three years of exile. Guasconi was exiled to Ancona; contrary to his original sentencing of three years, he was most likely forced to stay there until his death, which almost certainly occurred in 1449.
