= Villa di Spoiano =

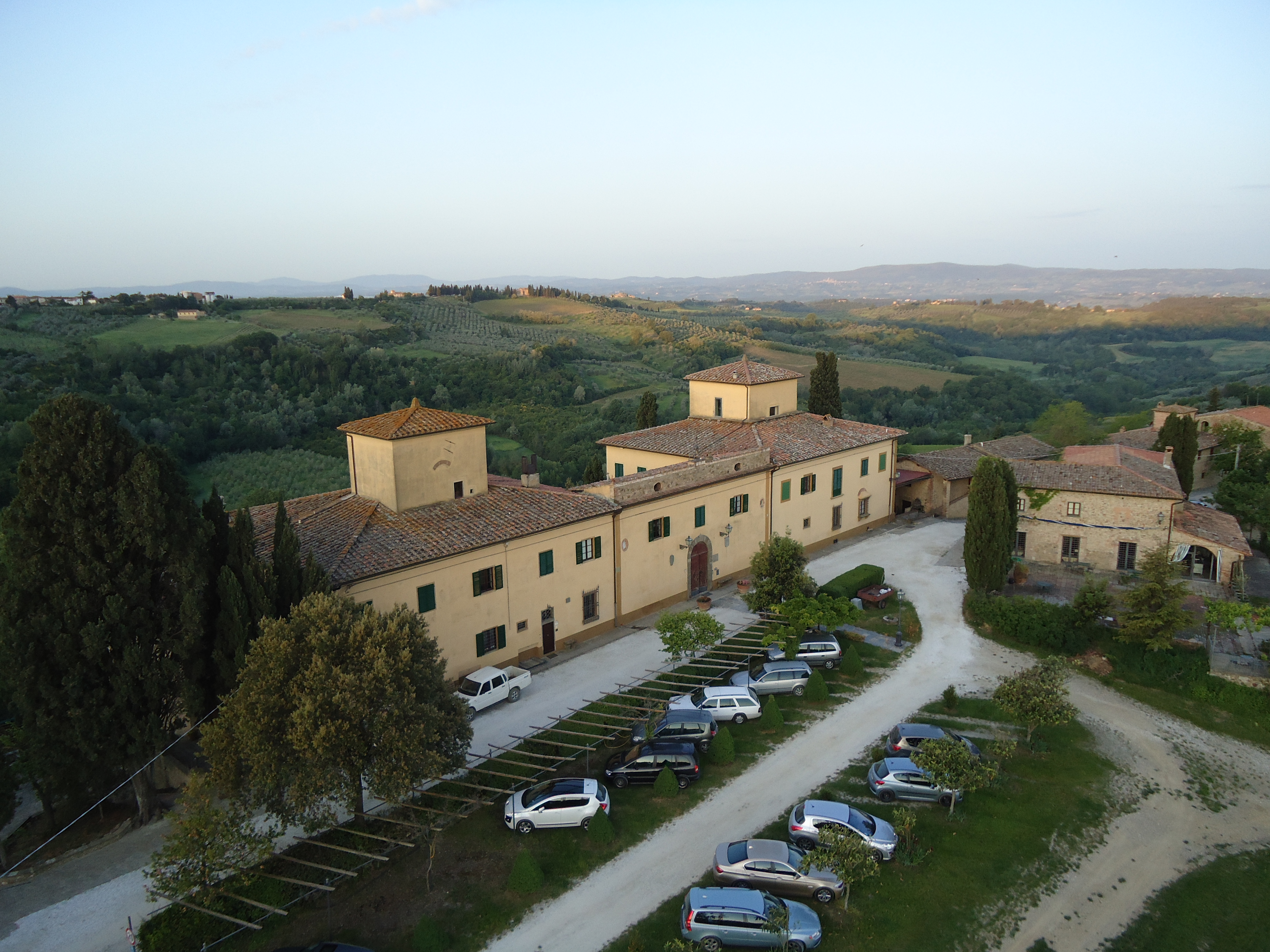
Fattoria Villa Spoiano organic farm

Villa di Spoiano is a renaissance villa located on a hillock between Tavarnelle Val di Pesa and Barberino Val d'Elsa. It has been cited for the first time in 1689 by San Jacopo a Magliano.

== Architecture ==
Villa di Spoiano consists of a large building with two wings arranged around an open courtyard facing the south. The complex is the result of the enlargement of some existing structures including a tower of considerable height. The villa appears to be generated by the union of two twin buildings, the originating volumes are still clearly identifiable on the south side where you can also find two elegant lodges with three round arches. The two towers are asymmetrical and had different functions: one served as a lookout tower and still has a sidewalk that allows to walk along ¾ of the perimeter, the other one served as a dovecote.

There are various trompe-l'œil decorated rooms on the first floor, the few chimneys and the presence of unheated bathrooms suggest that the villa was originally used as a summer resort residence.

== Chapel ==
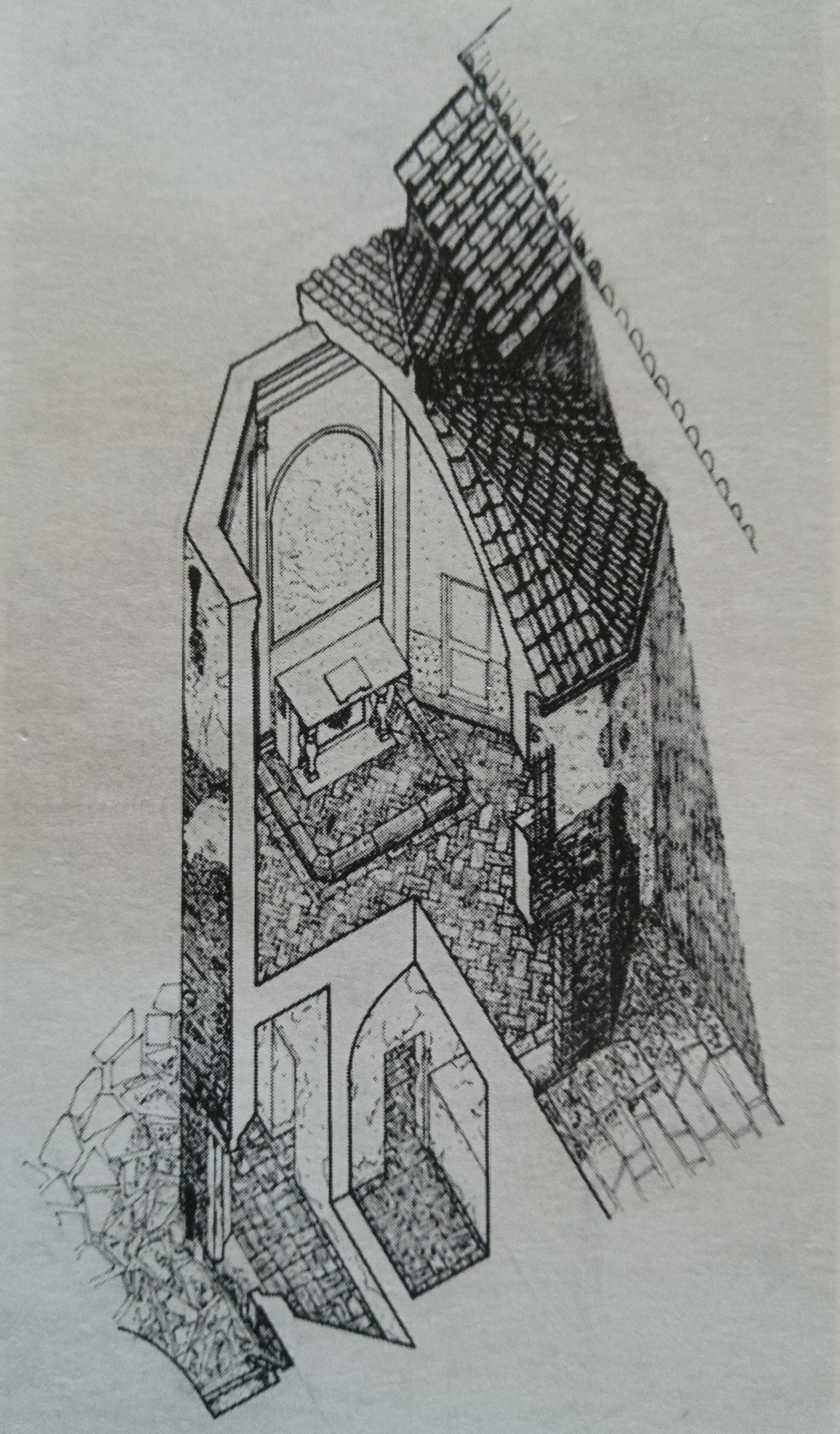
Chapel of Villa Spoiano

The octagonal chapel, attached to the main building, is entitled to the Holy Trinity. It was built in the early nineteenth century. The remains of some members of the De Nobili, Chiostri and Wäspi family are in the crypt below the chapel.

== History ==
During the 17th century, the property was owned by the De Nobili Family. During the 18th century, the owners were the Chiostri family.

In 1934 the villa was purchased at an auction by the Tinti Puccioni family. During the Second World War, General Kesselring and his German soldiers occupied the villa that was later on bombed by the Allies destroying part of the lookout tower and many statues of the garden.

In 1985 Spoiano was bought by the Wäspi family, who is currently managing the farm and the production of organic wine and olive oil.
