= Montelupo Fiorentino =

- Comune
- Comune di Montelupo Fiorentino
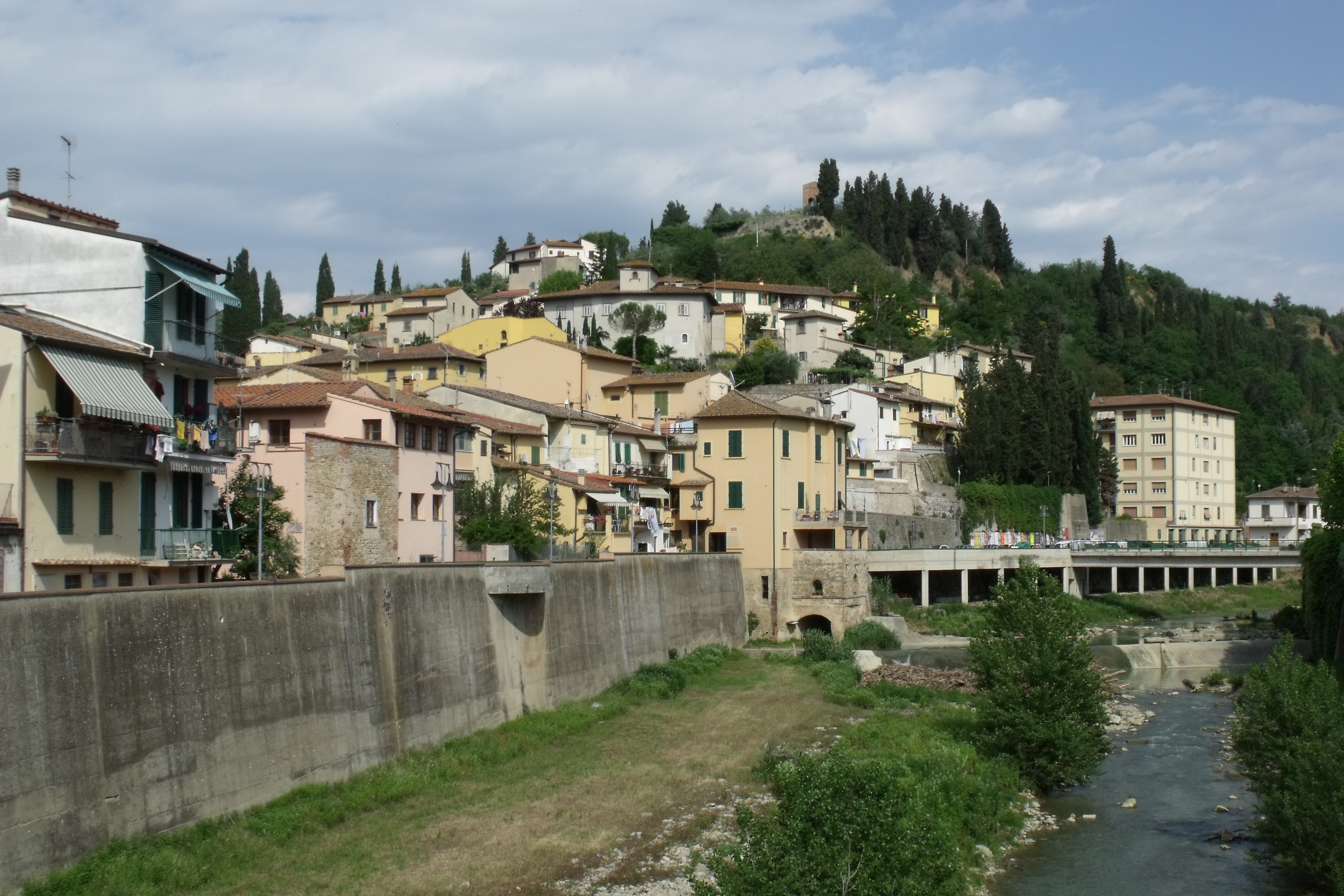
- Panorama of Montelupo Fiorentino

- Location within Italy Location within Tuscany
- Coordinates: 43°44′N 11°1′E
- Country: Italy
- Region: Tuscany
- Metropolitan city: Florence (FI)
- Frazioni: Ambrogiana, Botinaccio, Camaioni, Citerna, Erta, Fibbiana, La Torre, Pulica, Samminiatello, Sammontana, San Quirico, Turbone

Government
  - Mayor: Simone Londi (Partito Democratico (PD))

Area
  - Total: 24.67 km^{2} (9.53 sq mi)
- Elevation: 35 m (115 ft)

Population (01 January 2024)
  - Total: 14,296
  - Density: 579.5/km^{2} (1,501/sq mi)
- Demonym: Montelupini
- Time zone: UTC+1 (CET)
  - Summer (DST): UTC+2 (CEST)
- Postal code: 50056
- Dialing code: 0571
- Patron saint: St. John
- Saint day: 27 December
- Website: Official website

Montelupo Fiorentino is a comune (municipality) in the Metropolitan City of Florence in the Italian region of Tuscany, located about 20 kilometres (12 miles) southwest of Florence.

== Geography ==
The area is predominantly hilly and is crossed by the river Pesa that, particularly in the municipal area, flows into the Arno river.

== Governance ==
The current mayor is Simone Londi, elected in 2024. Londi is a member of the Partito Democratico (PD).

== History ==
Human presence in the area of Montelupo dates back to the Palaeolithic era. Evidence of this are the many prehistoric sites which have been identified in the last twenty years, in the municipal area.

Testimony of human presence during the classical era recently emerged from Etruscan civilization tombs in the old town and from the discovery of a Roman villa dating from the Republican age. The place was known as Mansio ad Arnum, as evidenced in the Tabula Peutingeriana, and it is probable that in the area there was a bridge that, during ancient Rome, permitted the crossing of the river Arno.

During the 5th and 6th centuries AD, the area faced threats of barbarian invasions, and the population left the plains and relocated to the surrounding hills. This phenomenon reached its peak during the 10th century, during the time of power struggles between the great families Guidi, Cadolingi and Alberti. These families realized in the area, a dense network of military facilities, which included the towns of Capraia and Montelupo Fiorentino.

At the end of the 12th century AD, began the expansion stage of Florence in the area, which found the fierce opposition of the Counts Alberti. Beginning on the 13th century AD, the town of Montelupo Fiorentino is destroyed by the Florentines, whom, on the same site, built a walled castle - true symbol of their domination in the territory.

Towards the end of the 14th century AD, Montelupo Fiorentino (who never had the name of Malborghetto, a real romantic invention) became a "walled village" of the Florentine countryside. The walls were built in 1348 (the year of the Black Death), and the Statute of the Powers dates back to 1414.

Until the 16th century AD, Montelupo Fiorentino lived his golden age. In mid 17th century AD, due to the plague that hit the area hard, a period of decline began, and irreversibly Montelupo Fiorentino was led to a drastic restructuring, which reached its peak in the late 18th century AD.

Since then and until World War II, Montelupo Fiorentino found himself on the border of everything. The country was shaken in the last half of the 20th century AD by some catastrophic natural events in nature. Most important are the floods of 1949,1966 and 1992. In these three events in fact, the Arno River north of Montelupo Fiorentino, and the Pesa River adjacent, flood submerging the country below four meters of water (two meters in 1992).

=== Production of ceramics during the Renaissance ===
Montelupo Fiorentino was one of the most important centers of pottery production during the Italian Renaissance, particularly tin-glazed earthenware known in Italy as Maiolica of Montelupo .

Montelupo was producing maiolica by the fourteenth century, usually painted with non-figurative motifs derived from imported Islamic ceramics. By the fifteenth century, the city's workshops had developed their own regional style.

Since then, and for more than three centuries, the furnaces have proliferated within the city walls (built in the mid-14th century), to over 50 units at the end of the 15th century. The production level was such that required an “Editto del Potestà” (Edict) to prohibit that the huge quantities of waste and processing residues were thrown in the adjacent Pesa River, so to avoid its stream to be diverted.

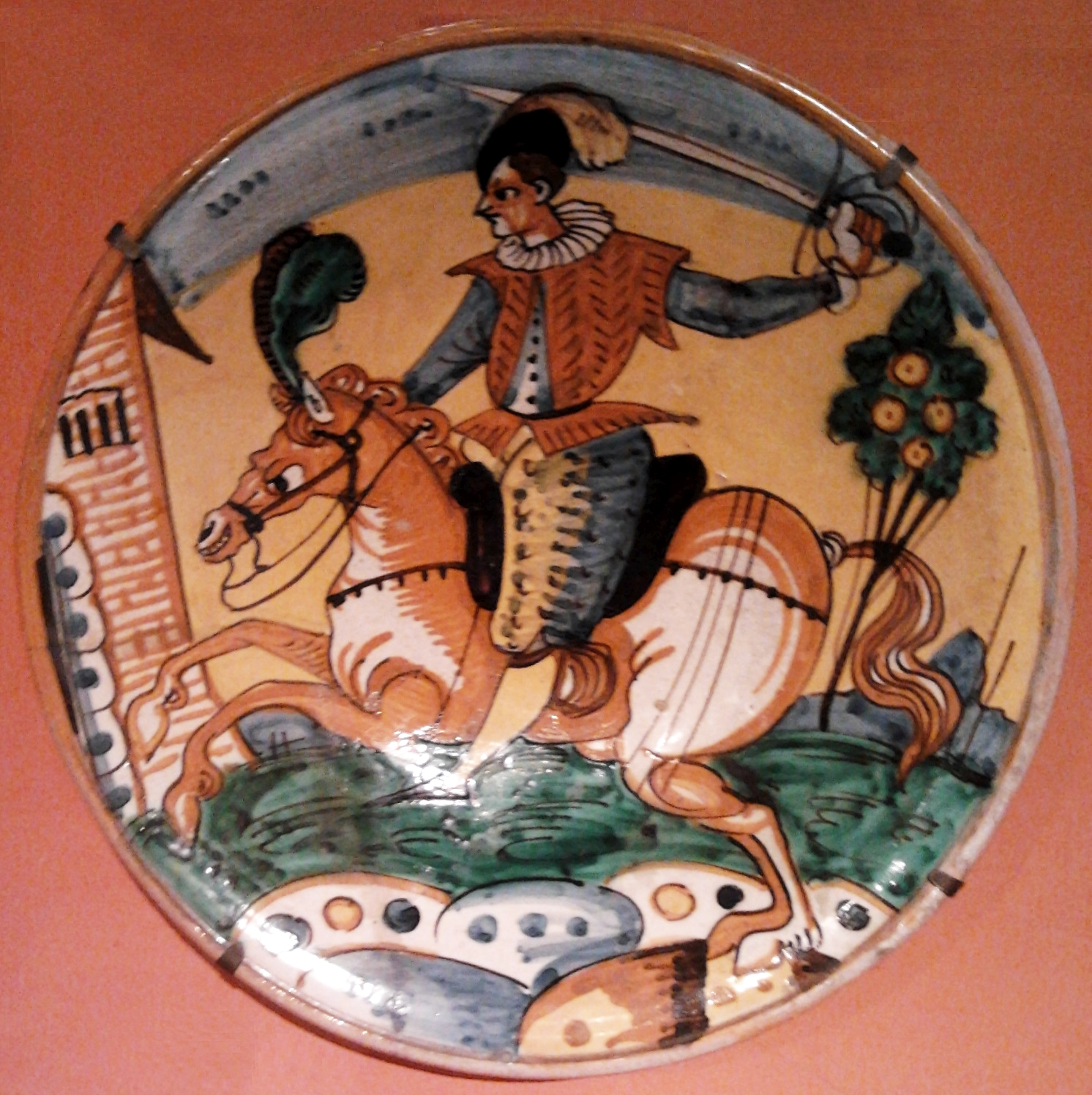
Arlecchino type plate with a horseman, an example of Montelupo's pottery from the beginning of the 17th century at the Royal Castle in Warsaw.

In the mid-15th century, Montelupo was an important part of the circulation of techniques and knowledge that characterized that period of history. Artists trained in Montelupo Fiorentino went to work in the cities of Faenza and Cafaggiolo, among others. Montelupo’s potters have also been documented in Caltagirone, where they influenced the pottery traditions that continue today.

Some pieces of Montelupo Fiorentino pottery have been found in archaeological sites in Central America related to the first European settlement in the area, as well as in the Philippines and Scotland.

Among Montelupo’s ceramics were Renaissance “istoriato” (historiated) maiolica, which is featured in international museums such as (Musée de Cluny, and Victoria and Albert Museum. A particular specialty was the 17th century "Arlecchini" style, a satirical depiction of different professions and national types, including the fearsome Landsknechts, German mercenaries who fought on behalf of Charles V, Holy Roman Emperor.

At the end of the 17th century, after the production of wonderful artifacts for pharmacies Florentine Dominicans of San Marco and Santa Maria Novella was finished, it began the slow but inexorable decline in the production of ceramics in Montelupo. Only through the production of the Capraia’s pots the tradition survived during the 18th and 19th centuries. The memory of the great ceramics of Montelupo, was then lost.

In 1977, the volunteers of the "Archaeological Group of Montelupo Fiorentino”, discovered inside the castle, overlooking the medieval village, the mouth of a large well (the well of washing), filled with fragments of pottery from the town’s kilns. The findings are displayed in the Museum of Ceramics of Montelupo.

== International relations ==
Montelupo Fiorentino is twinned with:

- Manises, Spain
- Moustiers-Sainte-Marie, France
- Beaucaire (Gard), France
- Nove, Italy
