= Mangona =

Coordinates: 44°02′59″N 11°11′45″E

Location of Mangona in Italy

Mangona (sometimes called Mangone) is a village in the municipality of Barberino di Mugello, in the metropolitan city of Florence, Italy. In the past it was the seat of the homonymous county, which took its name from the Castle of Mangona, now in ruins.

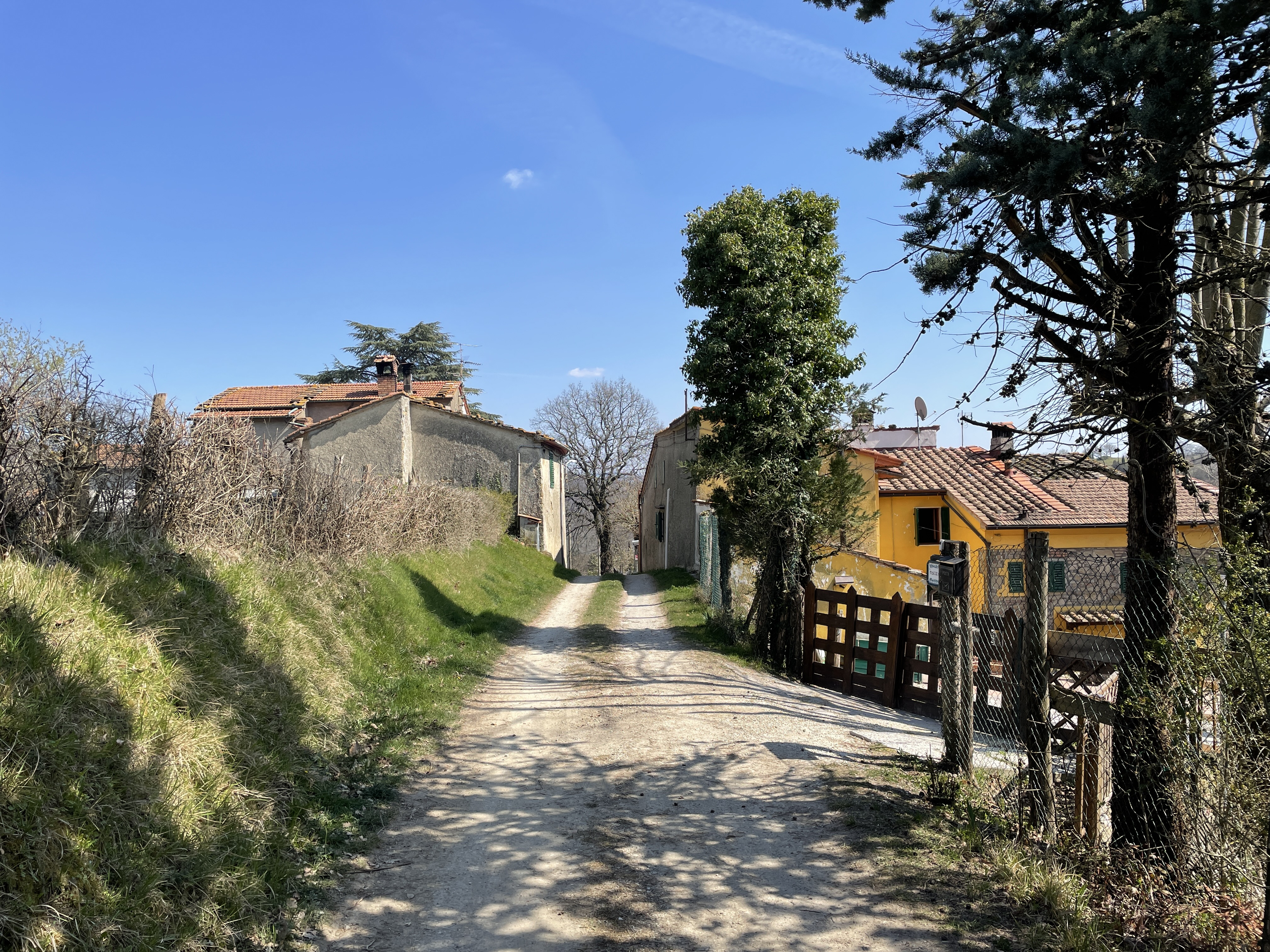
Former main street of Mangona. The farm of the Compagnia de Bardi di Vernio is on the right side.

== History ==
=== Under the Alberti ===
Starting from 1140, Mangona was a fief of the Counts of Mangona, a branch of the Alberti family, counts of Prato. Alberto IV degli Alberti di Mangona (1139-1203) had the feud confirmed by Emperor Frederick I in 1164, but over the years he lost his properties in Chianti (Marcialla and Semifonte), and was defeated in the battle of Montepiano on 9 September 1184. His two sons, Alessandro and Napoleone, fought strenuously for the paternal inheritance and were inserted by Dante in Inferno's Canto XXXII: "If you would like to know who these two are: that valley where Bisenzio descends, belonged to them and to their father Alberto."

The beauty of the noblewomen of the Alberti house was celebrated by French minstrels and troubadours. The sisters Beatrice and Adelaide of Mangona are remembered by Guilhem de la Tor (-1233): "e de Magon na Biatriz la bella e n'Alazais / sa sor, qui sap ja la novella" (translated: "and from Mangona comes Beatrice the beautiful, and Donna Adelasia her sister"). Aimeric de Peguilhan (1170-1230) also recalls Beatrice in another song: "For the bona comtessa Beatriz / for the gensor and for the plus valen / qu'es mort '! Oi, Dieus!"

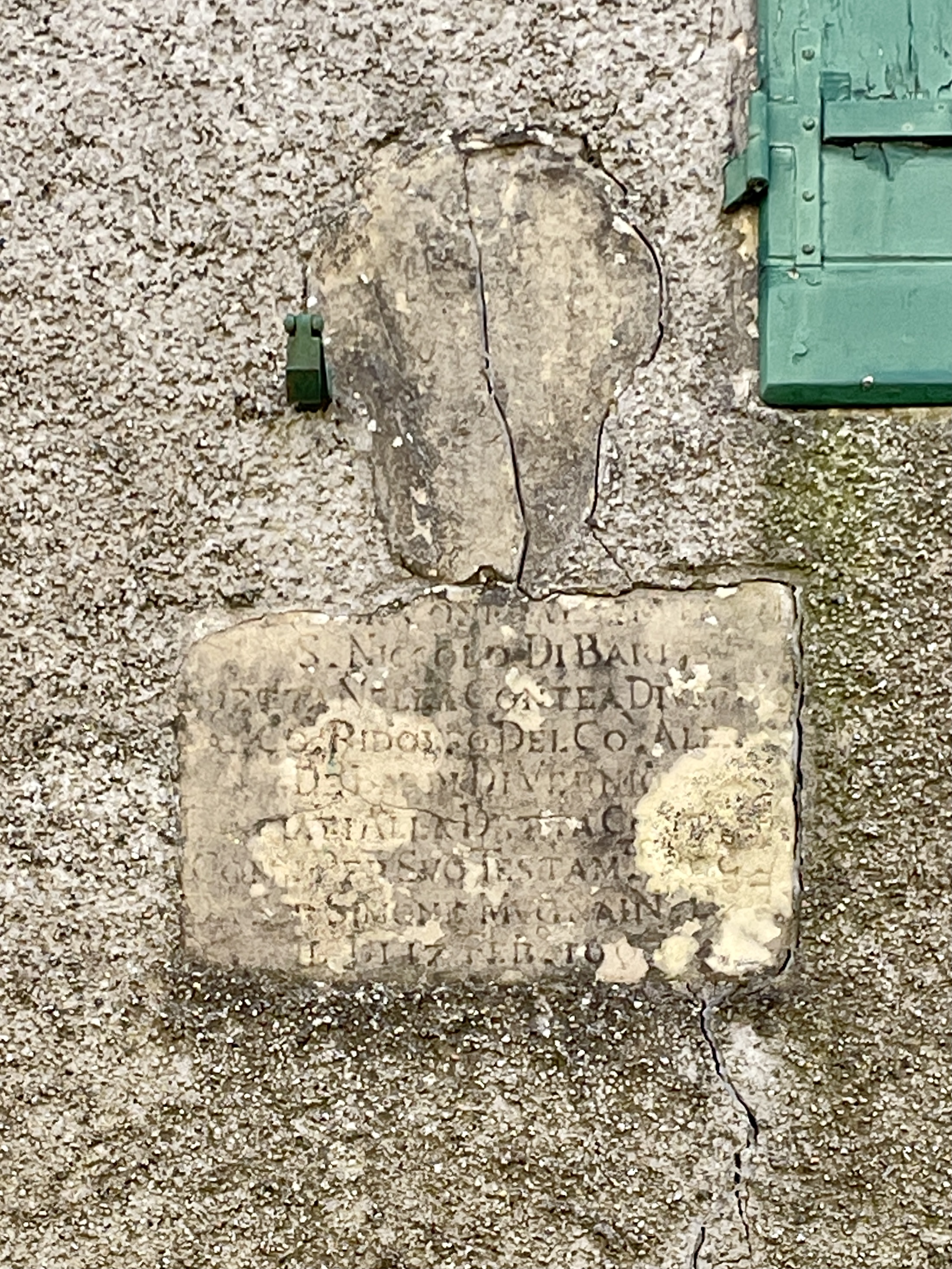
Coat-of-arms of the Bardi di Vernio family. The inscription recalls the donation of the farm by the Count Ridolfo de Bardi di Vernio to the Compagnia di San Niccolò di Bari on February 17, 1607.

=== Under the Bardi di Vernio ===
Margherita di Nerone, the last descendant of the Alberti di Mangona, sold the county on 14 October 1332 to Pietro di Gualtieri de Bardi (died 1345) for 10,000 gold florins. The power of Pietro soon worried the municipality of Florence, which in 1338 passed a law so that no citizen could buy castles on the edge of the city "and this was done, because those of the house of the Bardi, for their great power and wealth, had in those times bought the castle of Vernio and that of Mangona ... doubting the people of Florence, that they did not mount in pride and overthrow the people, as they did not a long time before." Pietro was the patron of the Bardi di Mangona Chapel in the left transept of the Basilica of Santa Croce in Florence. The frescoes of the Stories of San Silvestro and Costantino by the fourteenth-century painter Maso di Banco show the meeting between Pope Sylvester I and Constantine the Great, before the latter's conversion.

=== Under Florence ===
Following a conspiracy organized by Pietro against the Florentine government, on 15 January 1341 he was forced to sell off a part of the county, including the castle and the fief of Mangona, to the Commune of Florence, as reported in the Chronicle of Giovanni Villani: "E in the following January the Commune bought Mangone from Messer Andrea de 'Bardi 7,700 gold florins". The Bardi remained at the head of the County of Vernio until 1814, while Mangona remained in the Florentine possessions. In 1345, a list of the inhabitants of the family heads was drawn up, who from then on became Florentine citizens: Mangona had 29 families, and 13 nobles. "Administratively, the territory was included in the San Gavino Adimari religious district and later in the League di Santa Reparata in Pimonte. " The Statute of the League of Mangona and Santa Reparata dated 12 December 1416, and includes sections on "the defense and maintenance of farmland and the products on the land ". [12] When an even more widespread control system became necessary, the Podesterie were born. Thus, the old league of Santa Reparata was included in the new Podesteria of Barberino, which was called "of Barberino and Mangona". In the land register of 1427, Mangona counted 82 "Fires" (family unit subject to taxation), against the 75 of Barberino and the 17 of Santa Reparata. In the sixteenth century, Barberino took over in size and importance and the name of Mangona was removed.

The heroic-comic poem divided in twenty canti Il torracchione desolato by Bartolomeo Corsini (1606–1673) is a love affair between two fictional characters, Alcidamante count of Mangone and Lazzeraccio, count of Ortaglia, and takes place entirely in the territory between Mangona and Barberino. Written circa 1660, it was first printed in 1768 in Paris.

=== Recent history ===
In 1788 a new customs house was built near Mangona at the Rio della Vergine, at the intersection with the roads to Vernio and Monteccucoli, which gradually replaced the customs house of the Forche - until 1797 a border post between the County of Vernio and the Grand Duchy of Tuscany - which came to be a less easy and popular itinerary. The memory of the latter remains in the toponyms Poggio Dogana and Doganaccia, which remained in ruins along the trail from Montecuccoli to Poggio Cupola. Eventually the customs office of Mangona was suppressed in the 1814 after the merging of the County of Vernio to the Grand Duchy.

Mangona hosted Giuseppe Garibaldi during his escape following the surrender of Rome, and after the death of his wife Anita. On 26 August 1849 Garibaldi, having crossed the Tuscan-Emilian Apennines from Santa Sofia, reached Mangona. "They looked for guides and, having found Giuseppe Cavicchi, a farmer of the Marquis Torrigiani, at two o'clock in the night between the 25th and the 26th they left with him in a carriage from Santa Lucia towards Mangona and then continued on to Montecuccoli, located on a summit at 638 m in the extreme north of the Calvana mountains". In via Mezzana 3 in Montecccoli there is a plaque commemorating the stop. From there they arrived at Mulino di Cerbaia where they continued along the Val Bisenzio to Prato.

During the World War II the Gothic Line passed through the hills above Mangona, the last defense organized by the German troops to stop the advance of the allies in the peninsula. "From the US military documents it was possible to analytically reconstruct the battle from 9 September 1944, the beginning of the advance from the outskirts of Prato of the 133rd regiment of the 34 US Div., until 24 September, the day of reaching Vernio and the Montepiano pass".

== Main sights ==
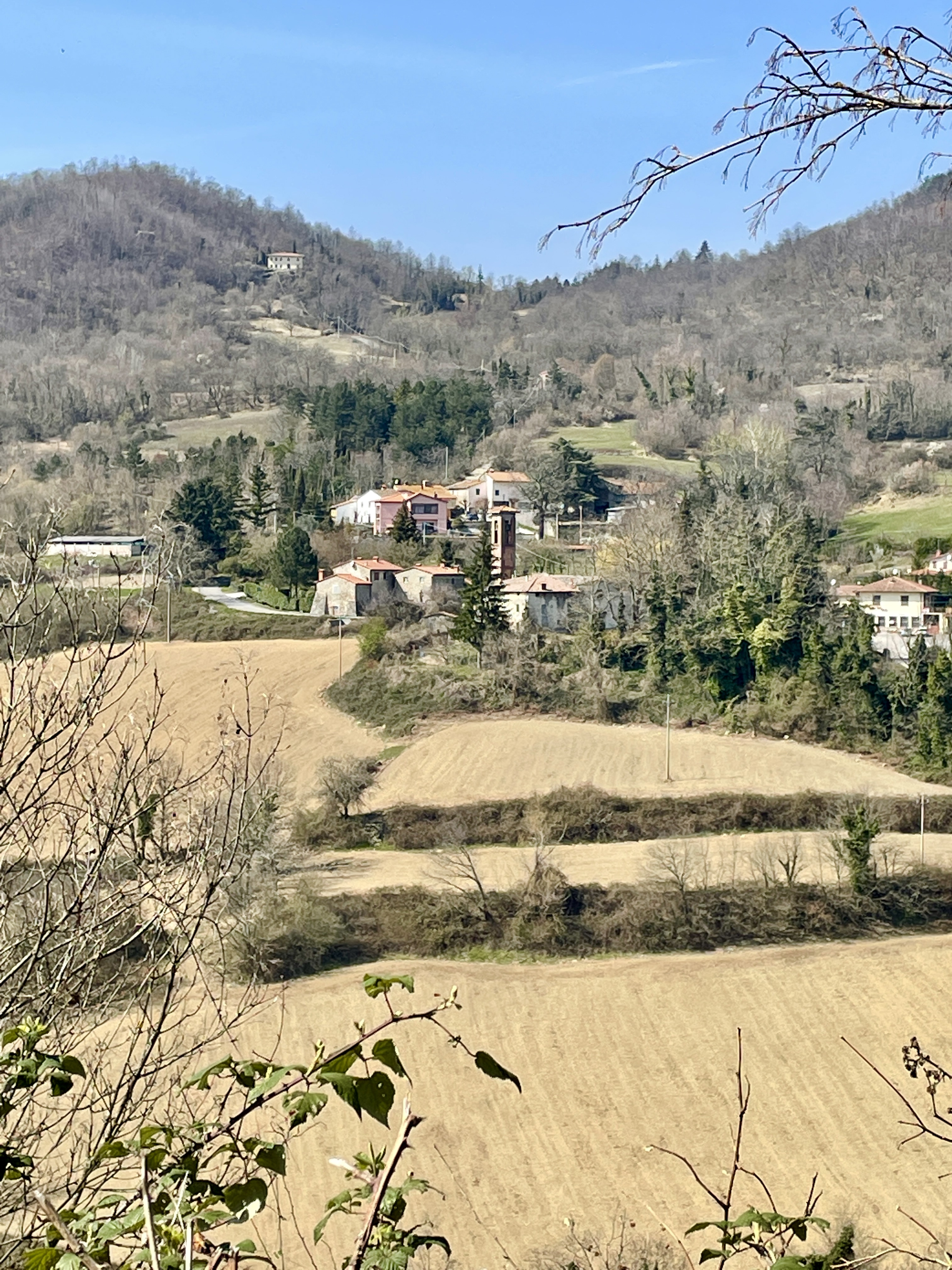
The church of Santa Margherita as seen from the castle.

=== Religious architecture ===
Mangona has historically been divided into two parishes, San Bartolomeo inside the castle, and Santa Margherita, built one kilometer north from it.

==== San Bartolomeo ====
The origin of the foundation of San Bartolomeo is uncertain. In 1342 the Duke of Athens wanted to found three chapels in the church dedicated to the Virgin, to Saint Paul and Saint Nicholas. Already in the sixteenth century the church was in ruins and lacking the residence of the parish priest. Between 1605 and 1613, the church and the rectory were rebuilt, an event remembered by the inscription placed above the door of the rectory: "Alessandra Gherardeschi Martelli had this house built at her own expense 1613". In 1902 there was a Martelli and Gherardesca marble coat of arms on the ground which was originally placed above the inscription. In 1970 the parish had 120 inhabitants. Today the church of San Bartolomeo is a private house.

==== Santa Margherita ====
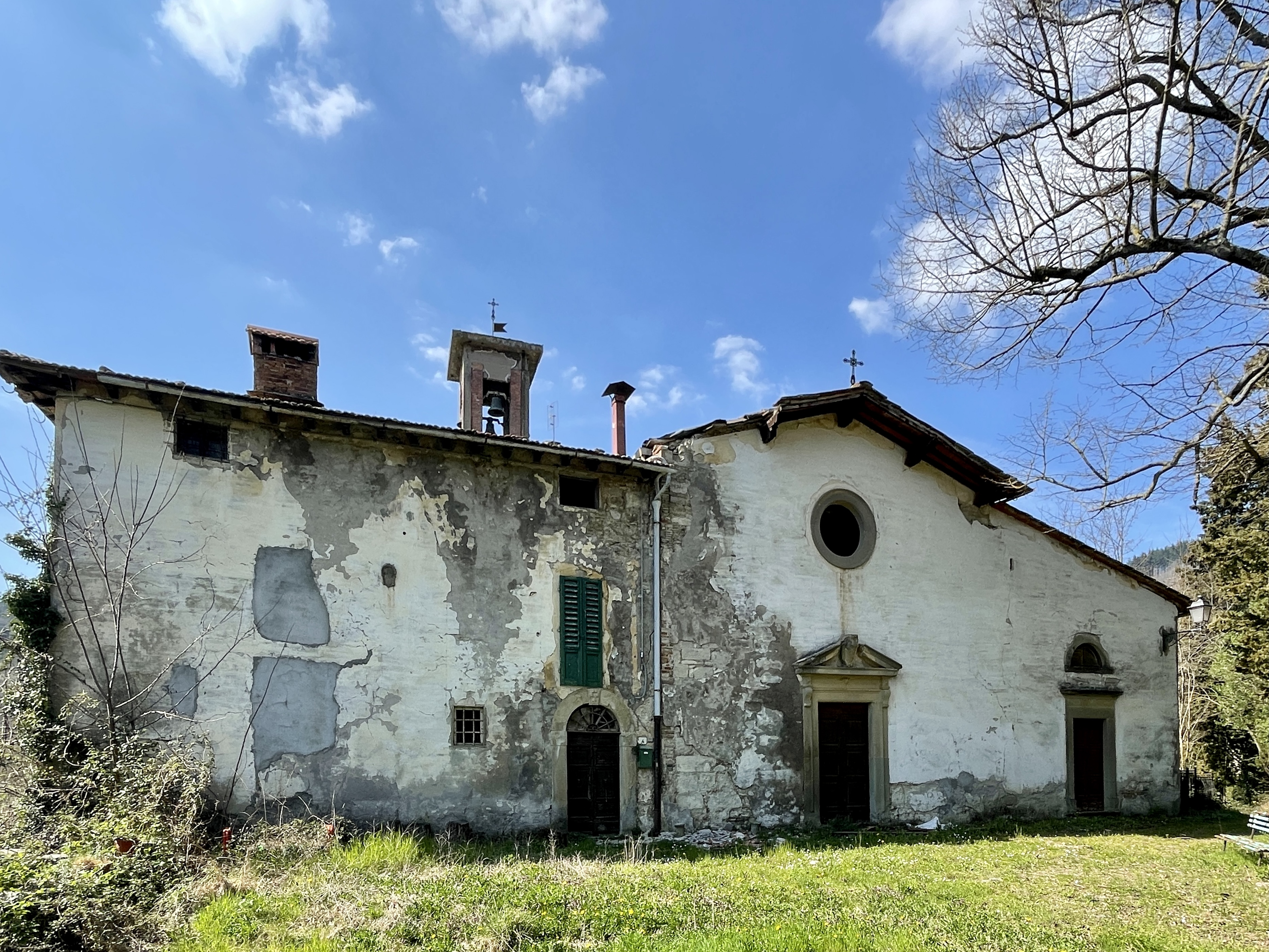
The facade of the church of Santa Margherita, with the parish house on the left and the oratory on the right.

The church of Santa Margherita dates back to at least 1276, when documents of the Tenth Pontifical record the proceeds of the parish: "Ecclesia sancte Margherite de Mangone pro I et II pay solvit lib. II sold. III". In the main bell of the bell tower it is written: A.D. 1383, in the minor: 1565 Christus Rex. The church was rebuilt in 1520, as the inscription above the door of the church recalls: "The present church made ser Baccio Savi Rector 1520. Restored by priest Raffaello Betti Rector 1602". Restored after the earthquake of 1919, the high altar was rebuilt in 1937. The parish in 1970 had 108 inhabitants and is now abandoned.

== Transport ==
Mangona is connected with Barberino di Mugello and Montepiano (PO) by provincial road 36. The Vernio-Montepiano-Cantagallo railway station on the old direct Florence-Bologna is 6.8 km away. The San Piero a Sieve station on the Faentina railway is 20 km away. SITA and CAP bus lines depart from Barberino di Mugello (8 km).

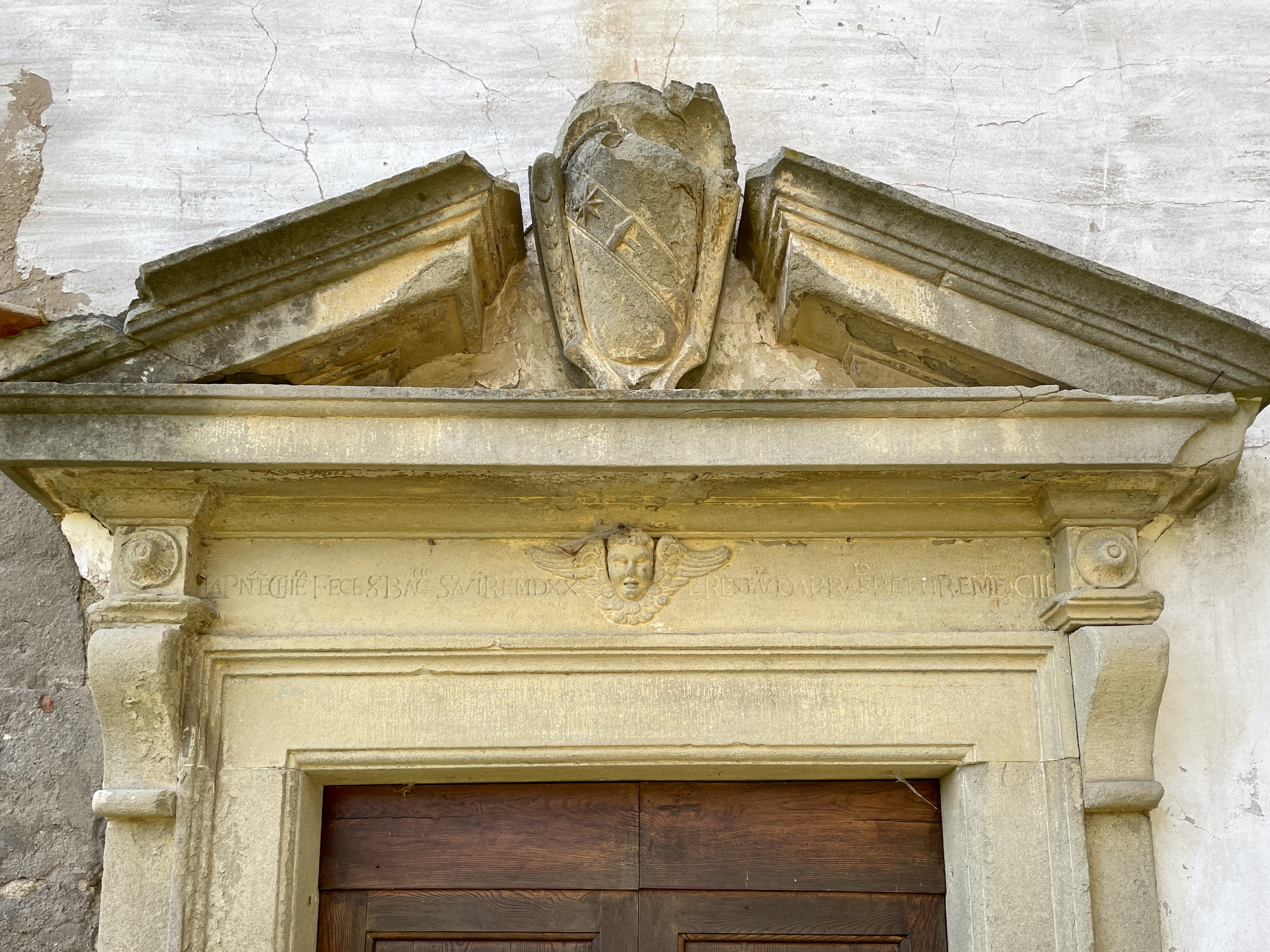
Detail of the portal of the church of Santa Margherita.
