= Barberino Tavarnelle =

- Comune
- Comune di Barberino Tavarnelle
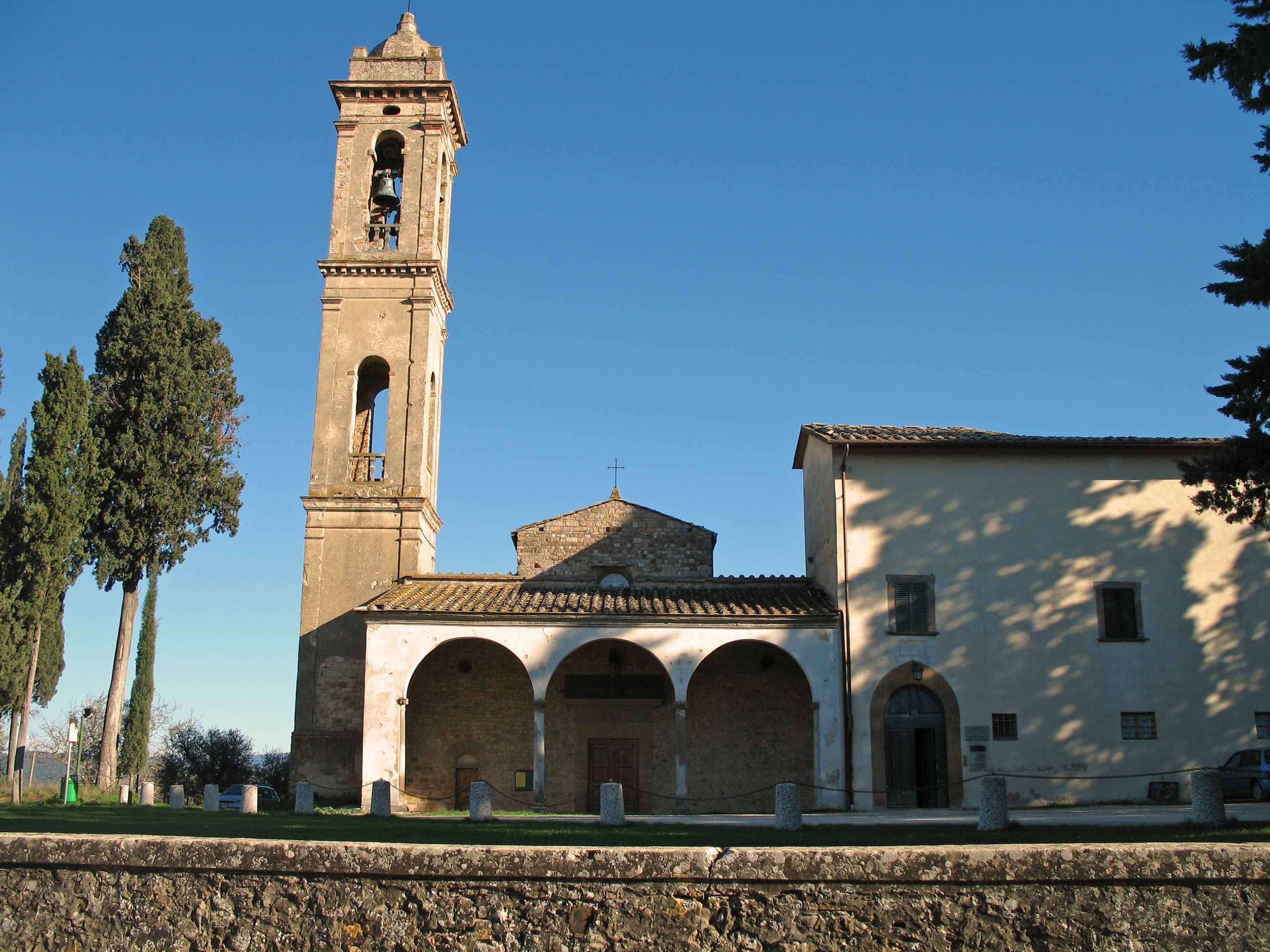
- Pieve of San Pietro in Bossolo

- Location within Italy Location within Tuscany
- Coordinates: 43°33′7″N 11°10′23″E
- Country: Italy
- Region: Tuscany
- Metropolitan city: Florence (FI)

Area
  - Total: 122.98 km^{2} (47.48 sq mi)

Population (2019)
  - Total: 12,076
  - Density: 98.195/km^{2} (254.32/sq mi)
- Time zone: UTC+1 (CET)
  - Summer (DST): UTC+2 (CEST)
- Website: Official website

Barberino Tavarnelle is a comune (municipality) in the Metropolitan City of Florence in the Italian region Tuscany, located about 25 kilometres (16 miles) south of Florence. It is one of I Borghi più belli d'Italia ("The most beautiful villages of Italy").

== History ==
Barberino Tavarnelle was created on 1 January 2019 by merger of municipalities of Barberino Val d'Elsa and Tavarnelle Val di Pesa.

== Frazioni ==
The municipality includes the following frazioni:

Badia a Passignano, Barberino Val d'Elsa, Bonazza, Casanuova del Piano, Chiostrini, Cipressino, Linari, Madonna di Pietracupa, Magliano, Marcialla (partially), Monsanto, Morrocco, Noce, Palazzuolo, Pastine, Petrognano, Pontenuovo, Ponzano, Romita, Sambuca Val di Pesa, San Donato in Poggio, San Filippo a Ponzano, San Martino, San Michele, San Pietro in Bossolo, Sant'Appiano, Sosta del Papa, Spoiano, Tavarnelle Val di Pesa, Tignano, Vico d'Elsa, Vigliano, Zambra

== Twin towns – sister cities ==
Barberino Tavarnelle is twinned with:

- Béboto, Chad
- Bodo, Chad
- Edchera, Western Sahara
- Fălticeni, Romania
- Gagny, France
- Hatvan, Hungary
- Schliersee, Germany
- Tangermünde, Germany
