= Pesa (river) =

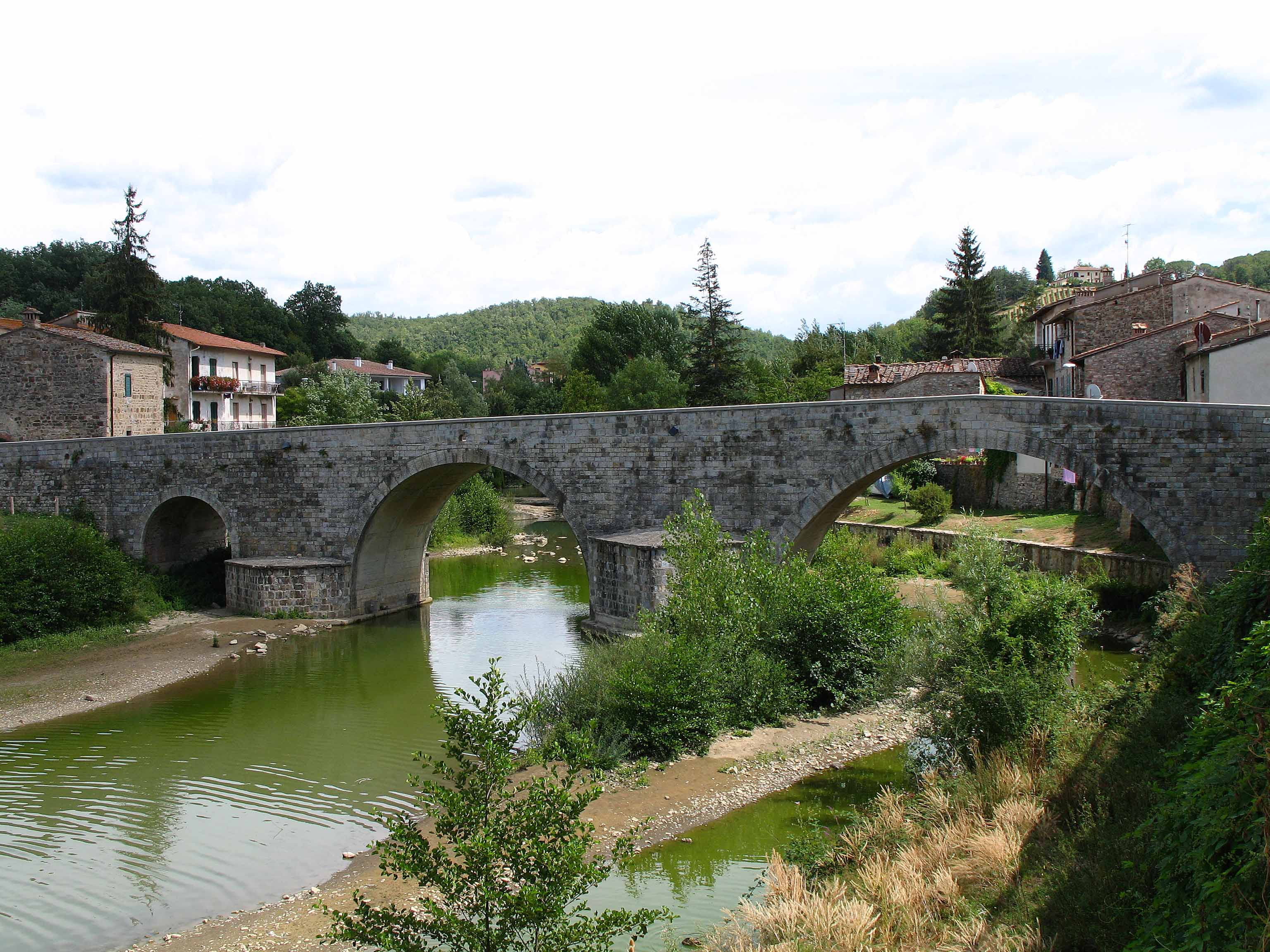
- Ramagliano Bridge at Sambuca Val di Pesa

Location
- Country: Italy

Physical characteristics
- Source
  - location: Monte San Michele
  - elevation: 892 m (2,927 ft)
- Mouth
  - location: Arno River
  - coordinates: 43.7330°N 11.0157°E
- Length: 53 km (33 mi)
- Basin size: 339 km^{2} (131 sq mi)

Basin features
- Progression: Arno→ Tyrrhenian Sea

The Pesa is a river in Tuscany, central Italy. It has a length of 53 km, and, after crossing the provinces of Siena and Florence, flows into the Arno River near Montelupo Fiorentino.
