= Tavarnelle Val di Pesa =

Municipality in Tuscany, Italy

- Frazione
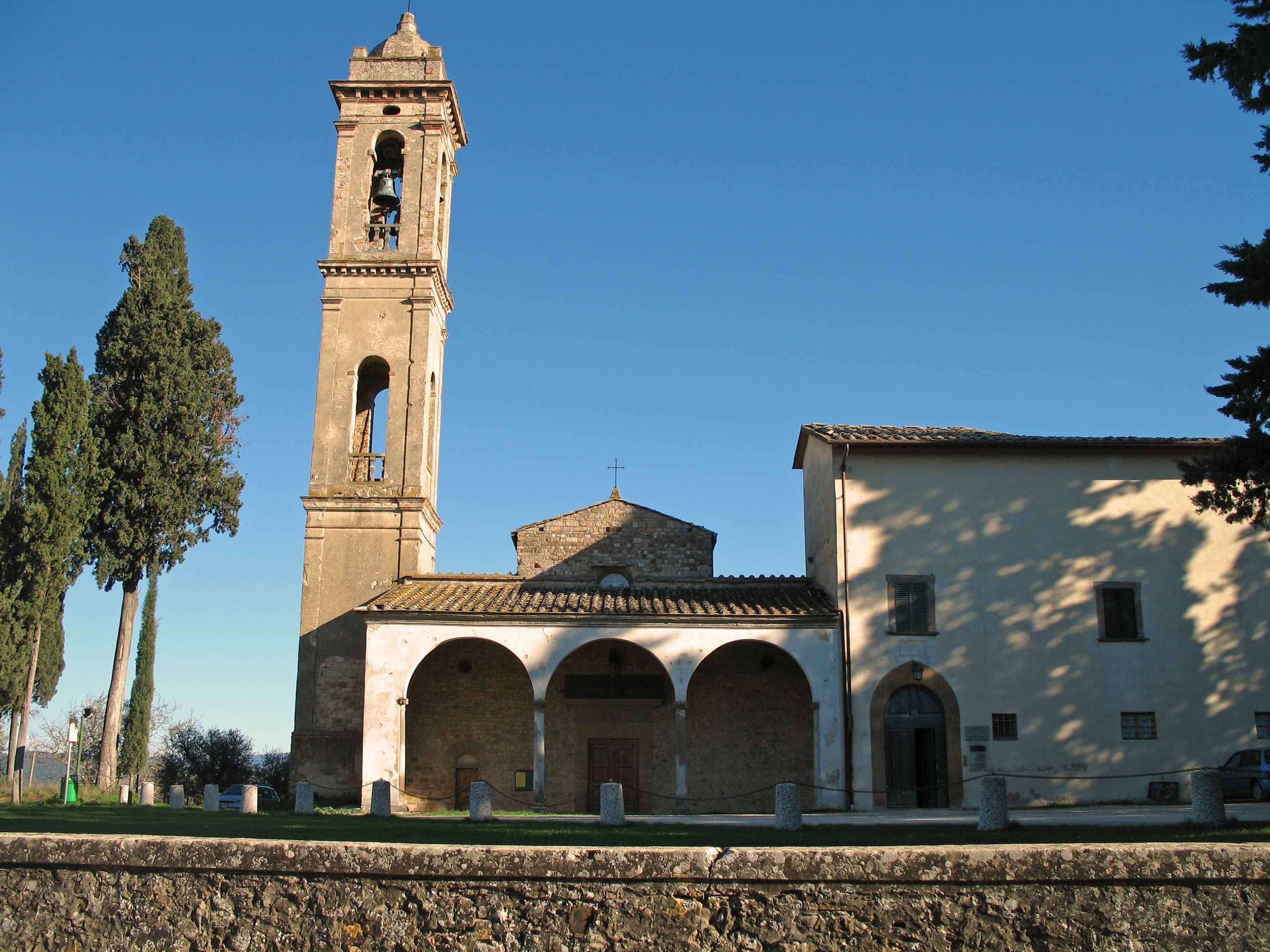
- Pieve of San Pietro in Bossolo

- Location of Tavarnelle Val di Pesa in Italy
- Coordinates: 43°33′N 11°10′E
- Country: Italy
- Region: Tuscany
- Metropolitan city: Florence (FI)

Area
  - Total: 57.0 km^{2} (22.0 sq mi)
- Elevation: 378 m (1,240 ft)

Population (1 January 2007)
  - Total: 7,346
  - Density: 129/km^{2} (334/sq mi)
- Demonym(s): Tavarnellini: Frazioni: Sambuchini, Sandonatini
- Time zone: UTC+1 (CET)
  - Summer (DST): UTC+2 (CEST)
- Postal code: 50028
- Dialing code: 055
- Patron saint: St. Lucy
- Saint day: December 13
- Website: Official website

Tavarnelle Val di Pesa is a village (Italian: frazione) in Barberino Tavarnelle in the Metropolitan City of Florence in the Italian region Tuscany. Before 2019 it was a municipality (Italian: comune). It is about 25 kilometres (16 miles) south of Florence.

== Sights ==
The main attraction of the territory of Tavarnelle is the Badia di Passignano (Abbey of Passignano), a monastery existing from the High Middle Ages.

Other sights include:

- Church of Santa Lucia al Borghetto, part of a Franciscan monastery known from 1260. The church is an example of Gothic architecture.
- Gothic church of Madonna della Neve, with 14th-15th-century frescoes.
- Church of Santa Maria del Carmine al Morrocco (15th century)
- Sanctuary of Santa Maria delle Grazie a Pietracupa, founded in 1596, with a Madonna image frescoed by Paolo Schiavo.
- Pieve of San Pietro in Bossolo, a Romanesque church known from 990, housing works from Roman, Byzantine and Florentine schools.
- Villa di Spoiano, renaissance villa between Tavarnelle Val di Pesa and Barberino Val d'Elsa
- Villa di Poggio Petroio, outside the town.
- The pieve of San Donato in Poggio (12th century), in Romanesque style, with a basilica plan with a nave and two aisles and three apses. It houses a baptism shell by Giovanni della Robbia (1513) and a triptych by Giovanni del Biondo (1375).
- Bridge over the Pesa River in the frazione of Sambuca.

Tignano is a fortified hamlet whose church of San Romolo houses a terracotta tabernacle by Giovanni della Robbia.
