= Benedetto Veli =

Italian painter

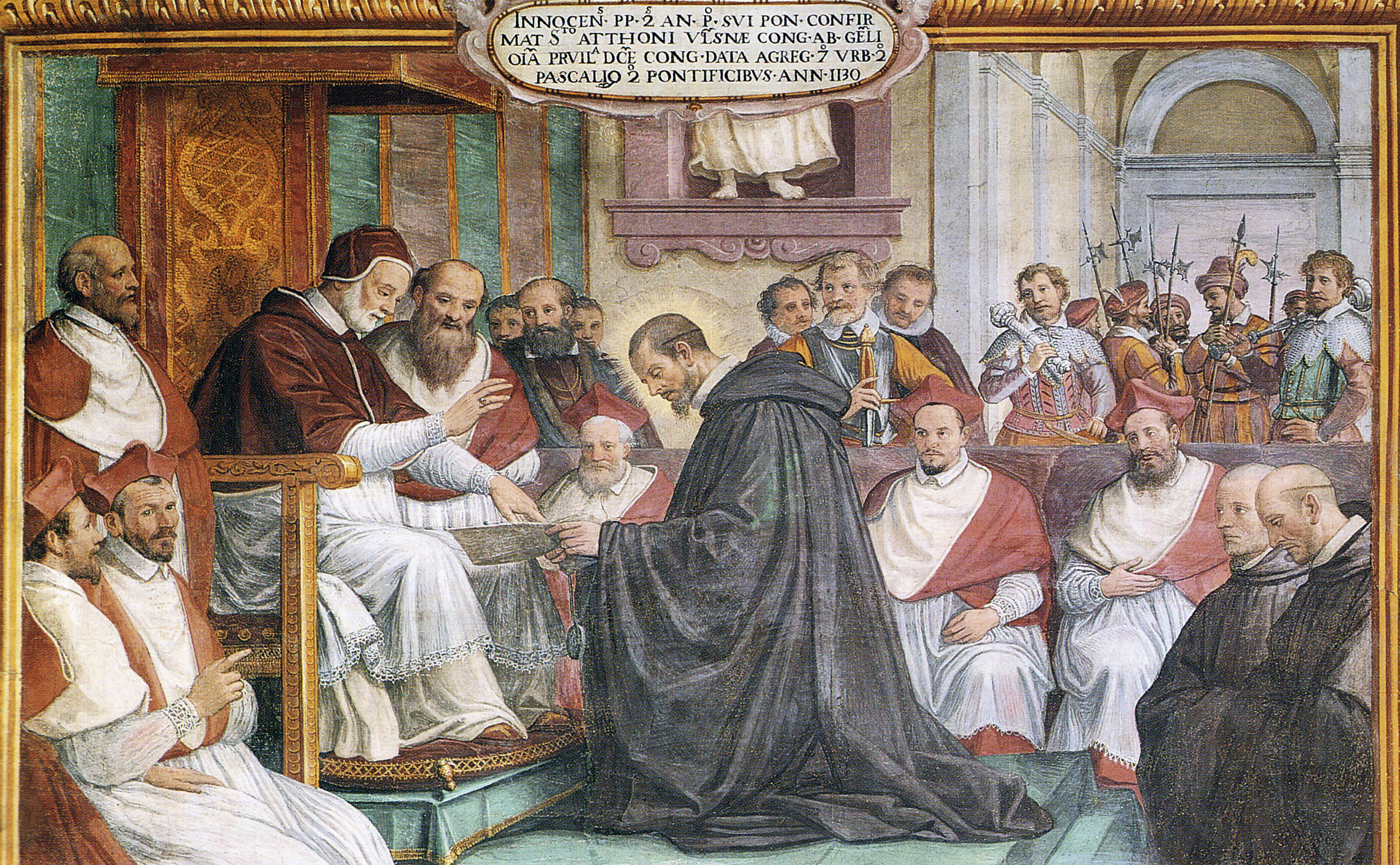

Benedetto Velli was an Italian painter of the Baroque period. He was born in Florence, and flourished in the 17th century. He painted an Ascension for the cathedral at Pistoia.
