= Bernardo di Stefano Rosselli =

Italian painter (1450–1526)

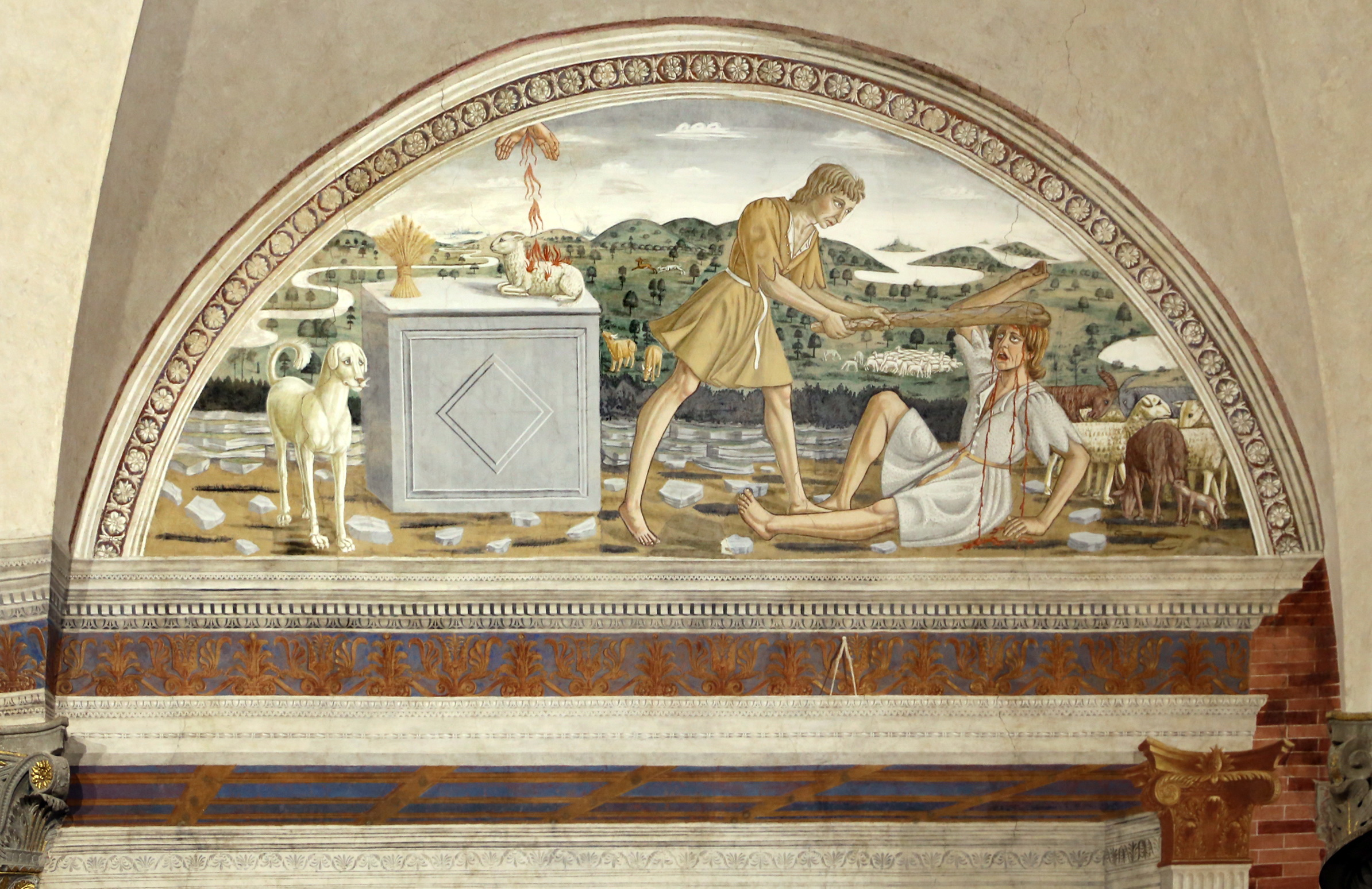
Cain and Abel, fresco, 1474, Badia a Passignano

Bernardo di Stefano Rosselli (1450–1526) was an Italian painter active in his native Florence and the surrounding countryside.

Bernardo was probably young teen when, along with his cousin, the more famous Cosimo Rosselli, he entered the workshop of Neri di Bicci in Florence. He was working as an independent artist by 1473, when he painted a fresco of the Crucifixion (now fragmentary) at they abbey of San Cassiano at Montescolari, near Figline Valdarno. In 1474 he painted two fresco lunettes of Adam and Eve and Cain and Abel in the refectory of the Abbey at Passignano in the Val di Pesa. In 1484 he painted a Madonna della Cintola with Saints for San Piero a Sieve in the Mugello, now in the Princeton University Art Museum. 1489 he painted the trompe l'oeil architecture and lilies on the walls of the Sala dei Gigli in the Palazzo Vecchio of Florence. An altarpiece of the Madonna and Child with Four Saints, dated 1497, is over the high altar of San Matteo in Terrossola, near Bibbiena. In 1499 Bernardo was paid to modify Bernardo Daddi's fourteenth-century altarpiece in the Rucellai chapel of San Pancrazio in Florence; Daddi's polyptych is now at the New Orleans Museum of Art, but Bernardo's additions are lost. Bernardo's fresco of the Martyrdom of Saint Sebastian at the Oratorio della Compagnia di San Sebastiano at San Martino a Sveglia, near Fiesole, is dated 1502.

Undated works include two fragmentary altarpieces (a Madonna and Child Enthroned and a Lamentation Over the Dead Christ) at Santa Maria a Brucianesi near Lastra a Signa, and dozens of panels of the Virgin and Child for domestic interiors. Bernardo also painted panels for cassoni, or wedding chests.
