= Semifonte =

Coordinates: 43°32′31.36″N 11°07′51.93″E

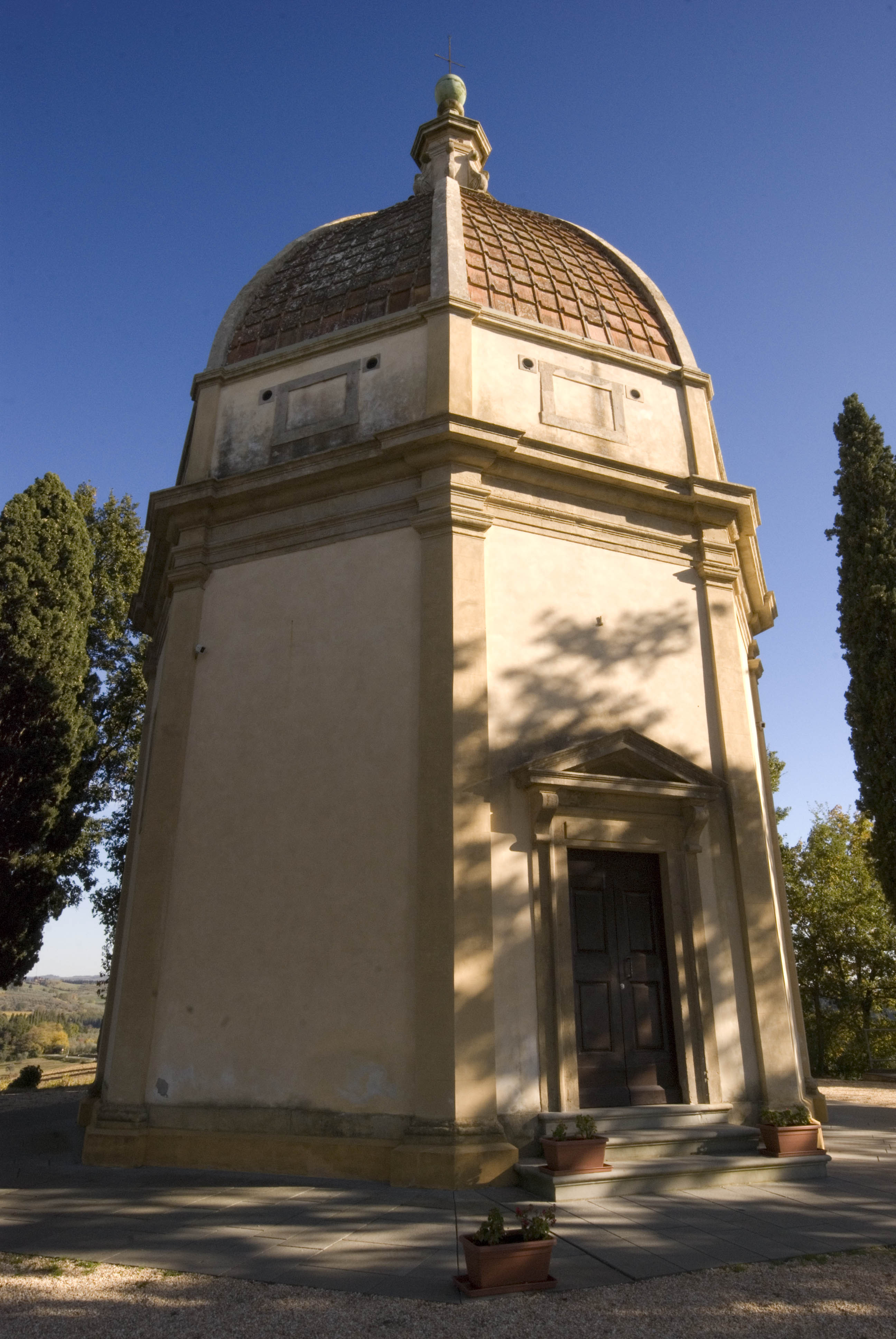
- Chapel of St. Michael at Semifonte.
- Interactive map of Semifonte
- Country: Italy
- Region: Tuscany
- Comune: Barberino Val d'Elsa
- Founded: Late 12th century
- Founder: Counts of the Alberti family
- Elevation: 280 m (920 ft)

Population
  - Total: (historical city now uninhabited)

Semifonte was a fortified city in Tuscany, Italy, built during the late 12th century and destroyed after a siege by Florence in 1202. Its remains are within the modern comune of Barberino Val d'Elsa.

It was sited midway between Florence and Siena on a hill overlooking the Elsa valley and the intersection of the two main routes in the area, the Via Francigena and the Via Chiantigiana, so enabling it to control trade in Tuscany. This dominant position proved to be its downfall.

The peace treaty required the surviving inhabitants to demolish their own city, exiled them all, and forbade any further building on the site. Supposedly salt was plowed into the ground. After the demolition, the stone was transported to nearby Barberino Val d'Elsa and was used in 1204, to build the walls that still stand today.

It was not until the 16th century that a commemorative chapel, dedicated to St Michael, was built on the site of Semifonte, by Santi di Tito in 1597; or in the 18th century by the Lorena family. The dome surmounting the chapel is a one-eighth scale replica of Brunelleschi's dome on the cathedral of Florence,

Today, very little remains of the city: one truncated tower of the southern gate (Porta San Niccolò) and a nearby chapel, plus various buried remains. These are to be found on the summit of the hill above the village of Petrognano-Semifonte, which dates back to the time of the city and stood outside the walls.

The Florentine campaign is documented in the archives of Florence. The events were also described by Pace di Certaldo, a contemporary author. There is a modern account in Italian in the book "Semifonte" by Enzo Salvini.
