= Barberino Val d'Elsa =

- Frazione
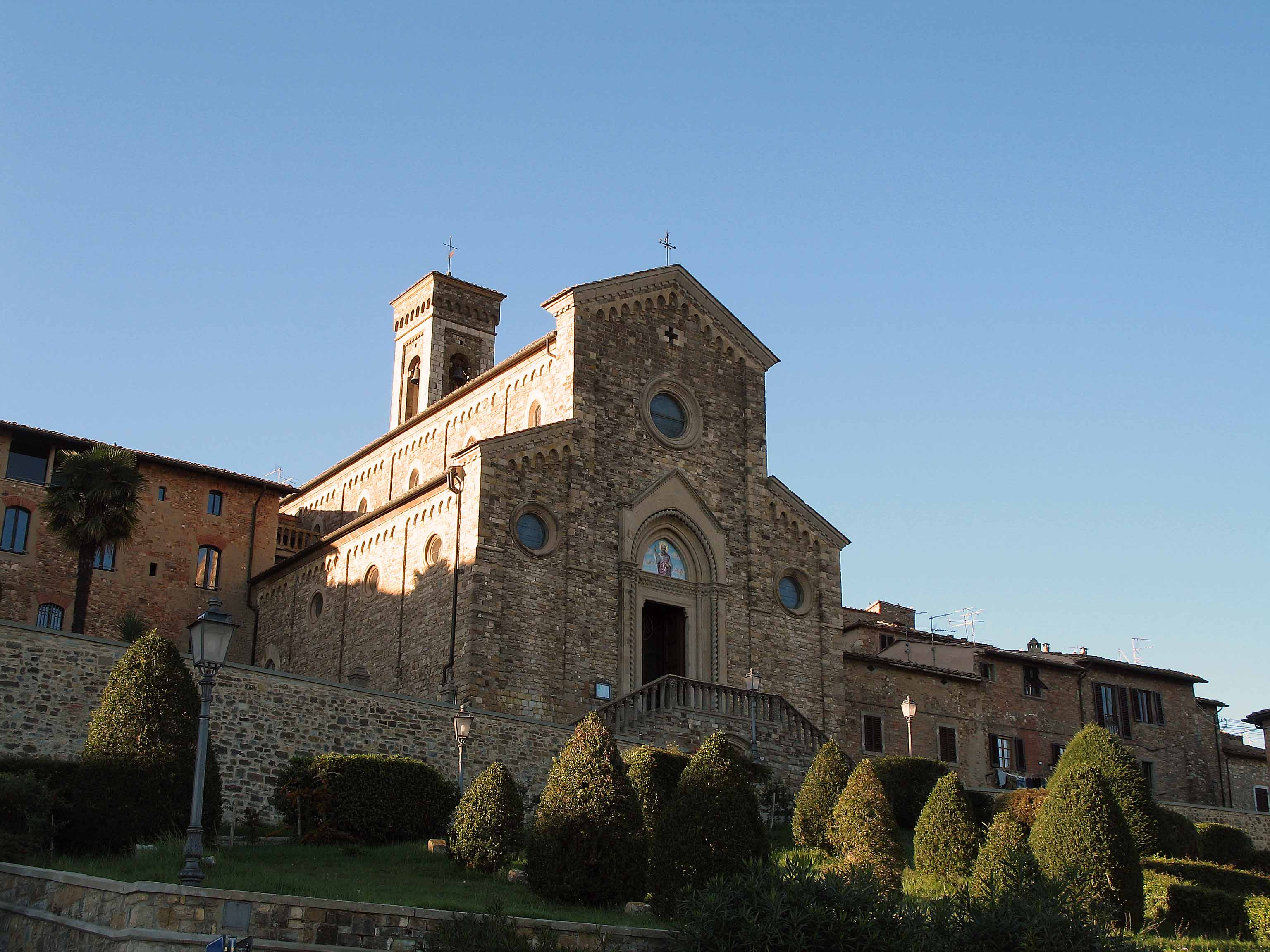
- The Pieve of Barberino

- Location of Barberino Val d'Elsa in Italy
- Coordinates: 43°32′N 11°10′E
- Country: Italy
- Region: Tuscany
- Metropolitan city: Florence (FI)
- Comune: Barberino Tavarnelle

Area
  - Total: 65.98 km^{2} (25.48 sq mi)
- Elevation: 373 m (1,224 ft)

Population (30 April 2017)
  - Total: 4,403
  - Density: 66.73/km^{2} (172.8/sq mi)
- Demonym: Barberinesi
- Time zone: UTC+1 (CET)
  - Summer (DST): UTC+2 (CEST)
- Postal code: 50021
- Dialing code: 055
- Patron saint: St. Bartholomew
- Saint day: 24 August

Barberino Val d'Elsa is a frazione of Barberino Tavarnelle. Until December 2018, it was a comune (municipality).

Barberino Val d'Elsa is located above the valley from which it takes its name. The centre of town is still ringed by its original fortifications.

== Main sights ==
The Piazza Barberi includes the Church of San Bartolomeo which houses a fragment of an annunciation by the school of Giotto (14th–15th century) and a bust in bronze by Pietro Tacca.

The Via Francesco da Barberino, named for Francesco da Barberino, leads to the 14th century Porta Senese (Sienese Gate), and the Ospedale dei Pellegrini (Pilgrims' Hospice) dating from 1365.

The Church of Sant'Appiano was built during the 11th century (part in stone) and 12th century (part in brick) and now includes the Antiquarium Museum housing various Etruscan artefacts from the many necropoli in the area, the village of Linari, the Castle of Poppiano at Vico d'Elsa and Petrognano.

The Chapel of San Michele Arcangelo was built in 1597 by Santi di Tito as a perfect 1:8 scale reproduction of the Cupola of the Cathedral of Florence. It was constructed on the site of the ancient city of Semifonte, razed to the ground by the Florentines in 1202. The site remains a focus for archaeological study.

The noble Barberini family dynasty began at Barberino Val d'Elsa in the 11th century.

== Twin towns ==
- Schliersee, Germany
- Amgala, Western Sahara
- Publier, France
