= Chianti tramway =

Former tramway in Tuscany, Italy

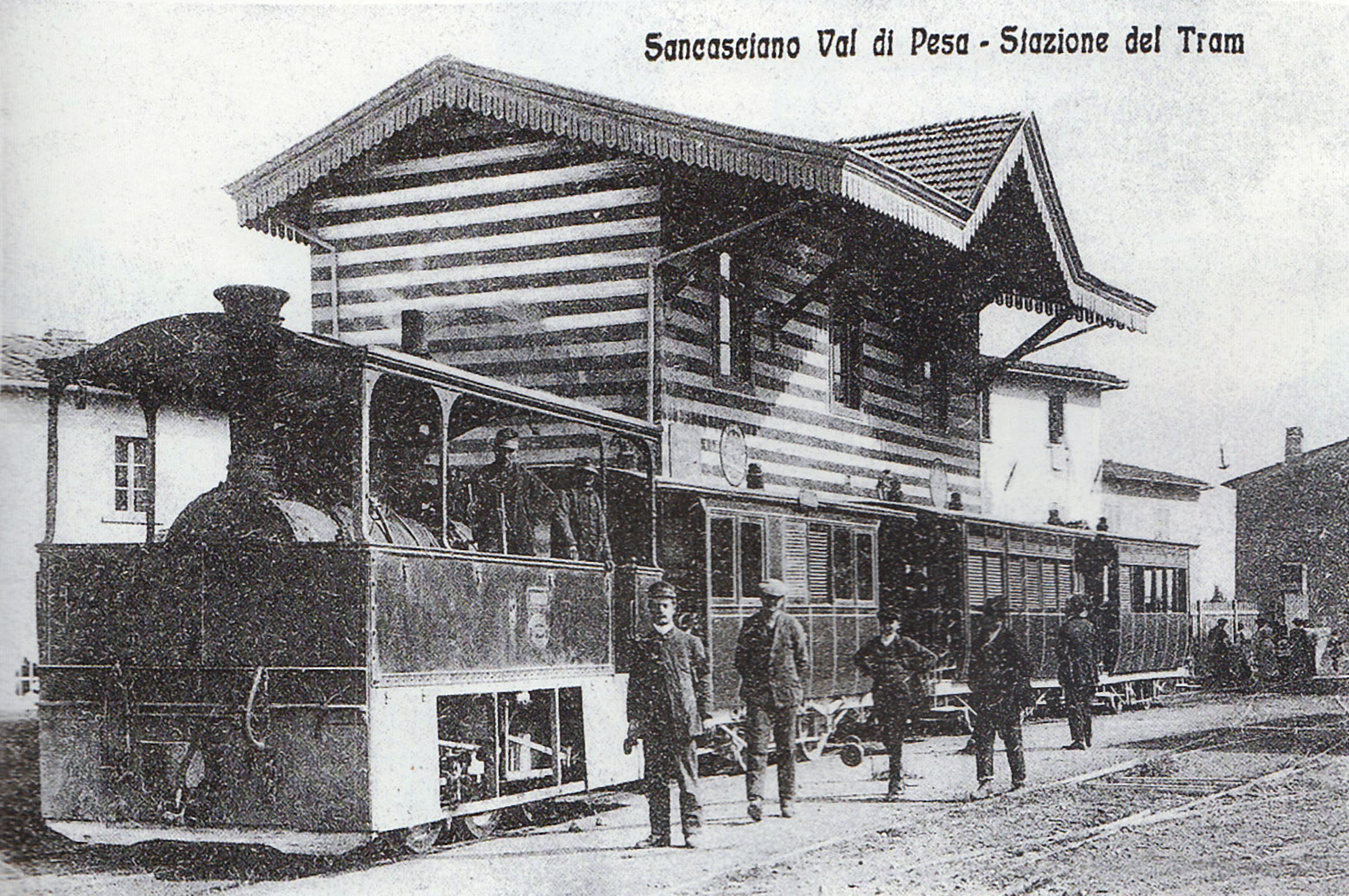
- The station of San Casciano in Val di Pesa
- Start: Florence
- End: Greve in Chianti
- Opening: 1890 to 1893
- Closure: 1935
- Former managers: Società Italiana per la Tramvia del Chianti e dei Colli Fiorentini; Società dei Tranvai Fiorentini; STU-FIAT
- Length: 42 km
- Type: Tramway
- Vehicles used: Tram engine
- Branch line: Ponte dei Falciani-San Casciano (4350 m)
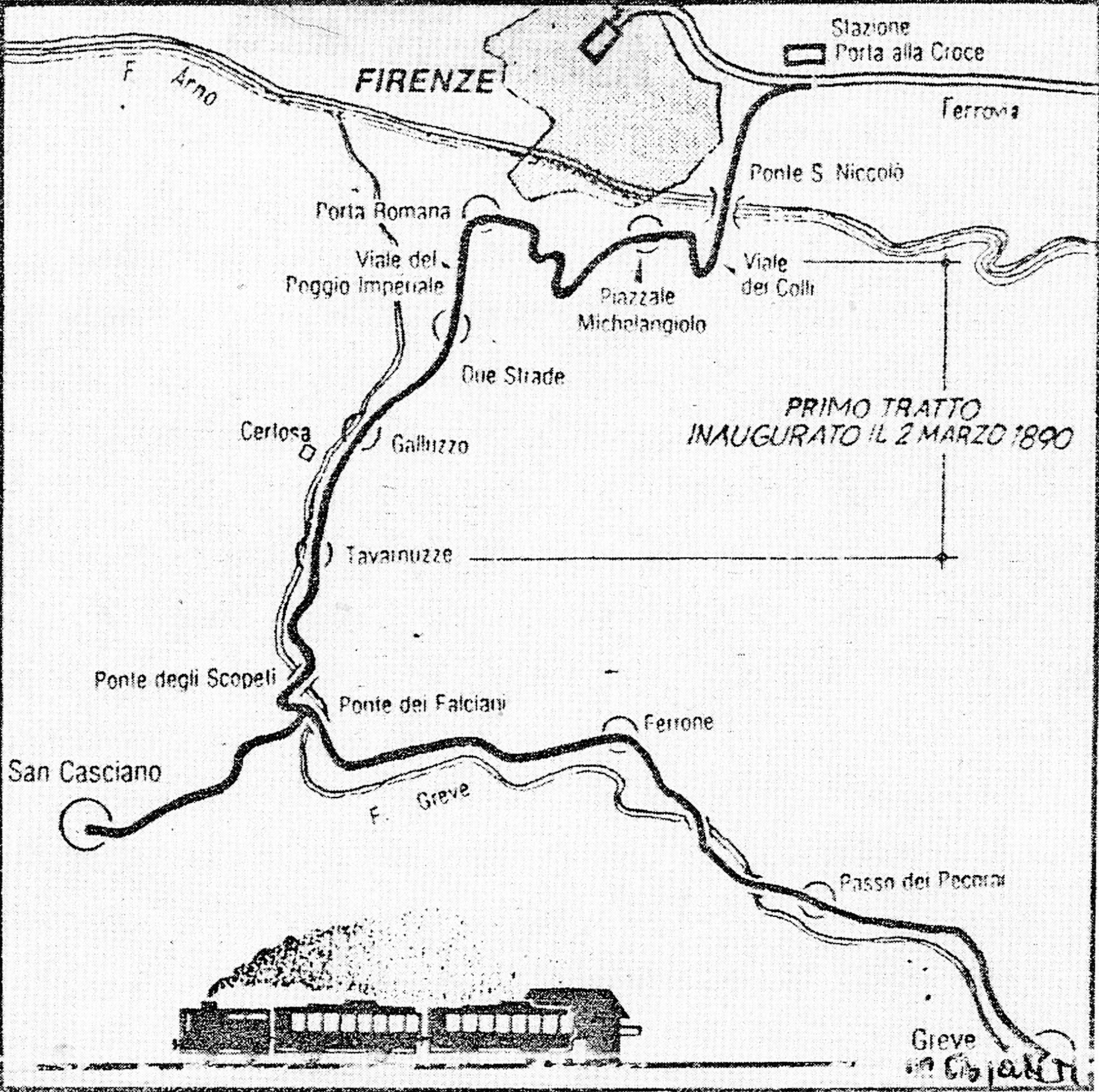

The Chianti tramway was a steam-powered tramway that connected Florence with the Chianti towns of San Casciano in Val di Pesa and Greve in Chianti.

It was primarily commissioned by Emanuele Orazio Fenzi, a banker and member of a family with railroad interests, and Sidney Sonnino, a politician representing the Chianti constituency in parliament. Opened in stages beginning in 1890, it had its terminus in Florence in what became Piazza Beccaria, reached San Casciano in Val di Pesa in 1891 and then, in 1893, Greve in Chianti.

It remained in operation for 45 years until 31 July 1935, when the service was discontinued.

== History ==
"Among the steam tramways in the Florentine area, the most famous was the Chianti tramway," which "because of its length, the rolling stock used, the movement of passengers and freight, and for being the last in the area to be discontinued, was the best known, most important and most beloved."

— Angelo Uleri, Le tranvie a vapore della Toscana, p. 92

=== Background ===
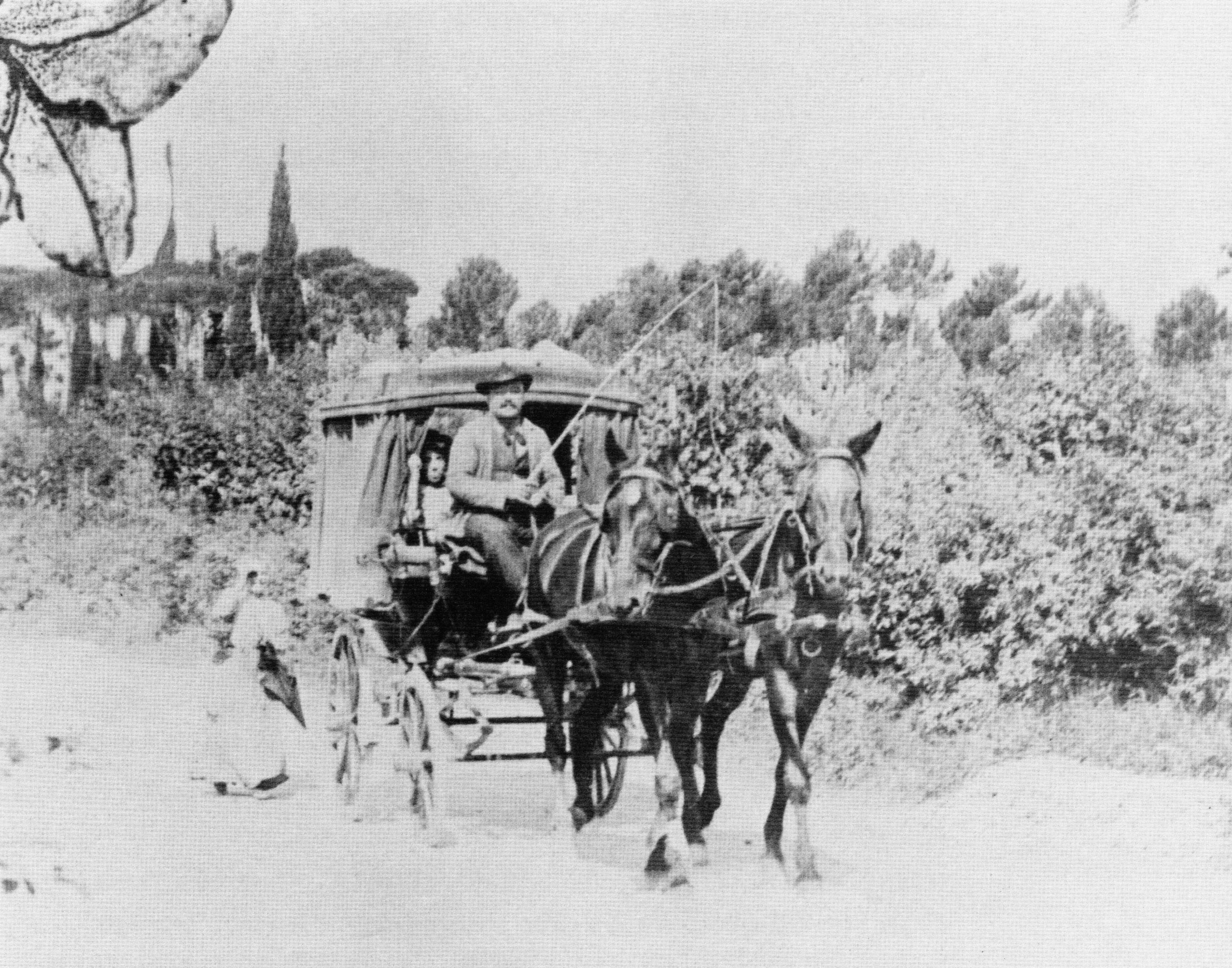
Stagecoach service between San Casciano and Mercatale in the early 20th century

Before the advent of the tramway, connections between Florence, Chianti and Siena relied on stagecoaches. In Florence, the largest company operating in the sector was the "Diligenze Toscane" owned by Luigi Orcesi, which, from its headquarters on Via Taddea, made regular runs to Milan, Bologna, Rome, Naples, Livorno and Pisa; other transport companies were that of Luigi Staderini based at Lungarno Acciaiuoli 10, which made runs to Rome and Naples on the San Casciano-Siena-Acquapendente route; that of Giuseppe Mazzarini known as Geppetto, which from 1845 made runs only as far as Siena; and finally that of Francesco Fineschi, based at Via della Mosca 7/R, which transported people and goods between Florence and Figline Valdarno. The stagecoach service offered by Mazzarini left Florence at 6 a.m. and did not return until the next day. For Greve, the stagecoach service was called "Procaccia": it ran only one round-trip service a day, departed from Via del Guanto and was operated by two Greve families, the Danti and the Tirinnanzi, including Giuseppe Tirinnanzi father of the painter Nino Tirinnanzi.

=== The first projects ===
The Chianti tramway was desired mainly for the political interest of Congressman Sidney Sonnino, who had his constituency in the Florentine Chianti municipalities, and could not remain indifferent to their pressure. In fact, his constituents had been very disappointed that the Chianti region had been left out of the Central Tuscan railroad, which, after Empoli, followed the Elsa and Staggia valleys, cutting off the Chianti region, and the Florence-Rome railroad, transiting through Arezzo.

The congressman's interests coincided with the aspirations of Florentine banker Emanuele Orazio Fenzi, who had long wanted to build a railway track between Florence and the municipalities of San Casciano in Val di Pesa and Greve in Chianti where he had land holdings.

Discussions about a rail line in Chianti began as early as 30 November 1884, when in the special supplement No. 335 of the newspaper La Nazione, the French engineer Jean Louis Protche, designer of the Porrettana railroad, illustrated a project for a Bologna-Florence-Rome direttissima line, which in the Bologna-Florence section was very similar to the one later built in 1934, but from Florence to Rome proposed to pass over a route via Siena and Rapolano Terme. In that article Protche stated:

[...] To the south of Florence lies a renowned district with rich vineyards and very interesting villages, namely Chianti. I traveled very complacently, with plans and profiles in hand, the track of the line from Florence to Rapolano, through Chianti, studied by Eng. Olindo Bucciolini and I was accompanied by Bucciolini himself and by Engineers Alessandri and Cav. Vitta. The Line near Florence passes easily from the plain of the Arno into the Valley of the Ema; it then passes near Impruneta, with a tunnel of 1000 m into the Valley of the Greve, where it keeps for a long stretch; it then passes with a tunnel of 3000 m near Panzano into the Valley of the Pesa, and soon comes out, with a tunnel of 2200 m near Radda to pass into the valley of the Massellone (confluent of the Arbia) and then, in its confluent Borro della Dadda; it finally passes with a 4100 m tunnel near Brolio into the valley of the Ambra and then reaches Rapolano without difficulty. The total distance from Florence to Rapolano is 74100 m. The cost is estimated at 25 million. [...]

The project met with immediate appreciation in Florence, so much so that, on the following 25 November the Florentine Popular Committee, after approving it, sent it to the provincial deputation of Bologna; the same project was sent to Rome to the Ministry of Public Works, which appreciated it, but at this point there was a rebellion and mobilization of Arezzo. The people of Arezzo came out openly against the Florence-Siena-Rome project and also against the Faentina railroad, then under study, and proposed, against it, a railroad from Arezzo to Forli. The opposition was only partially successful, as it succeeded in sinking the Florence-Siena-Rome line by making the passage through the Valdarno via Arezzo but not the Faentina. (Note: Despite the partial success, the Aretines continued the struggle against the Faentina but only succeeded in getting the Central Apennine railway built in the Arezzo-Fossato di Vico section, Uleri (1999, p. 94.))

The problem of a connection of the capital with the villages located in the Chianti hills remained, so engineer David Duranti, Chief Engineer of the Province of Florence and an ardent proponent of the railway line via Siena, took a step back and sided with the project, much more modest, of a steam-powered tramway line to Greve in Chianti complete with a branch line to San Casciano in Val di Pesa, with, however, the possibility of lengthening the Greve section to Siena and the San Casciano section to Tavarnelle and Barberino Val d'Elsa.

==== Avenue of the Hills or Carraia Valley ====
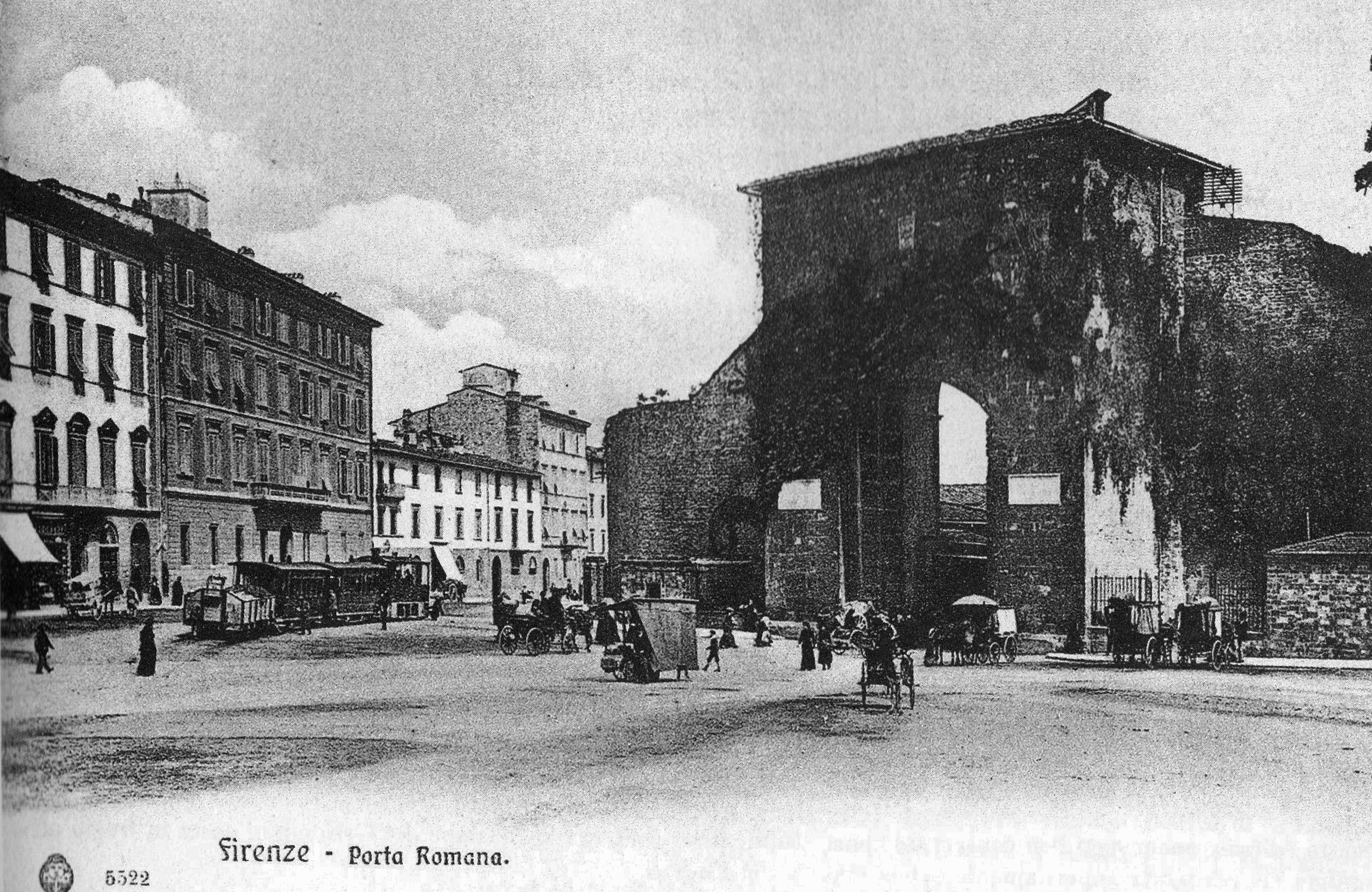
A mixed train stopping at the terminus of Porta Romana

Immediately after the presentation of the project the experts and the population were divided into two factions, those in favor and those against, with the opponents led by architect Giuseppe Poggi who, while considering his masterpiece (the Viale dei Colli) untouchable, declared himself in favor of the tramway as long as it underwent changes.

The clash began on 15 September 1887, when engineer Duranti supported the project in front of the provincial council and won considerable praise for it. A second and fundamental victory was won by the proponents of the tramway on 23 March 1888, when the province of Florence approved the concession for the Chianti tramway. On 15 June that year the province approved a resolution in favor of engineer Giuseppe Lenci's project requested by Mr. Emanuele Orazio Fenzi representing the Ditta Bancaria Emanuele Fenzi & C. of Florence; the project included an outline budget of 1,632,000 lire excluding the cost of rigging and rolling stock, as well as a whole series of works to be built: a new iron bridge in place of the one over the Arno at San Niccolò, a new road between Poggio Imperiale and Due Strade in the Gelsomino valley, the rectification of large sections of the Via Romana with the construction of two new bridges at Rimaggio and Testi, and in addition consolidations were mandatory at the Mulino del Diavolo bridges, the Scopeti bridge, the Falciani bridge, the Casellina and the Sant'Angelo bridge.

Poggi's response came on 7 June 1888, in a leaflet distributed throughout the city and its environs, in which he said:

A steam tramway intended to carry from Florence to Chianti, and vice versa, merchandise, livestock, passengers, workers, etc. will be useful, but it will never be convenient to the Avenue of the Hills, as it was intended to be. The walking of citizens and strangers alike will lose the best attractions, and the work will necessarily come to be altered in those which are constituent parts of its beauty.

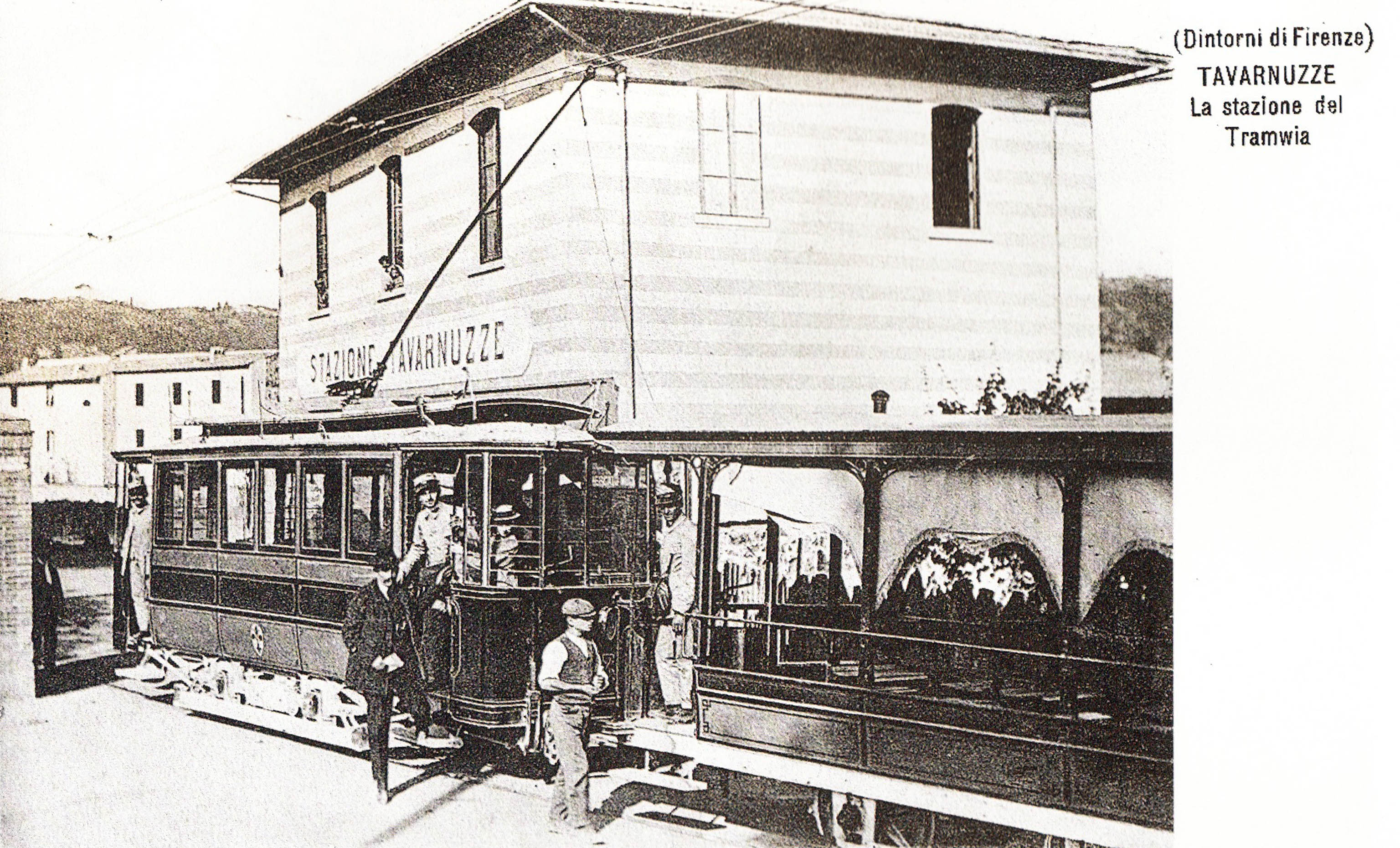
Tavarnuzze station in the early 1900s.

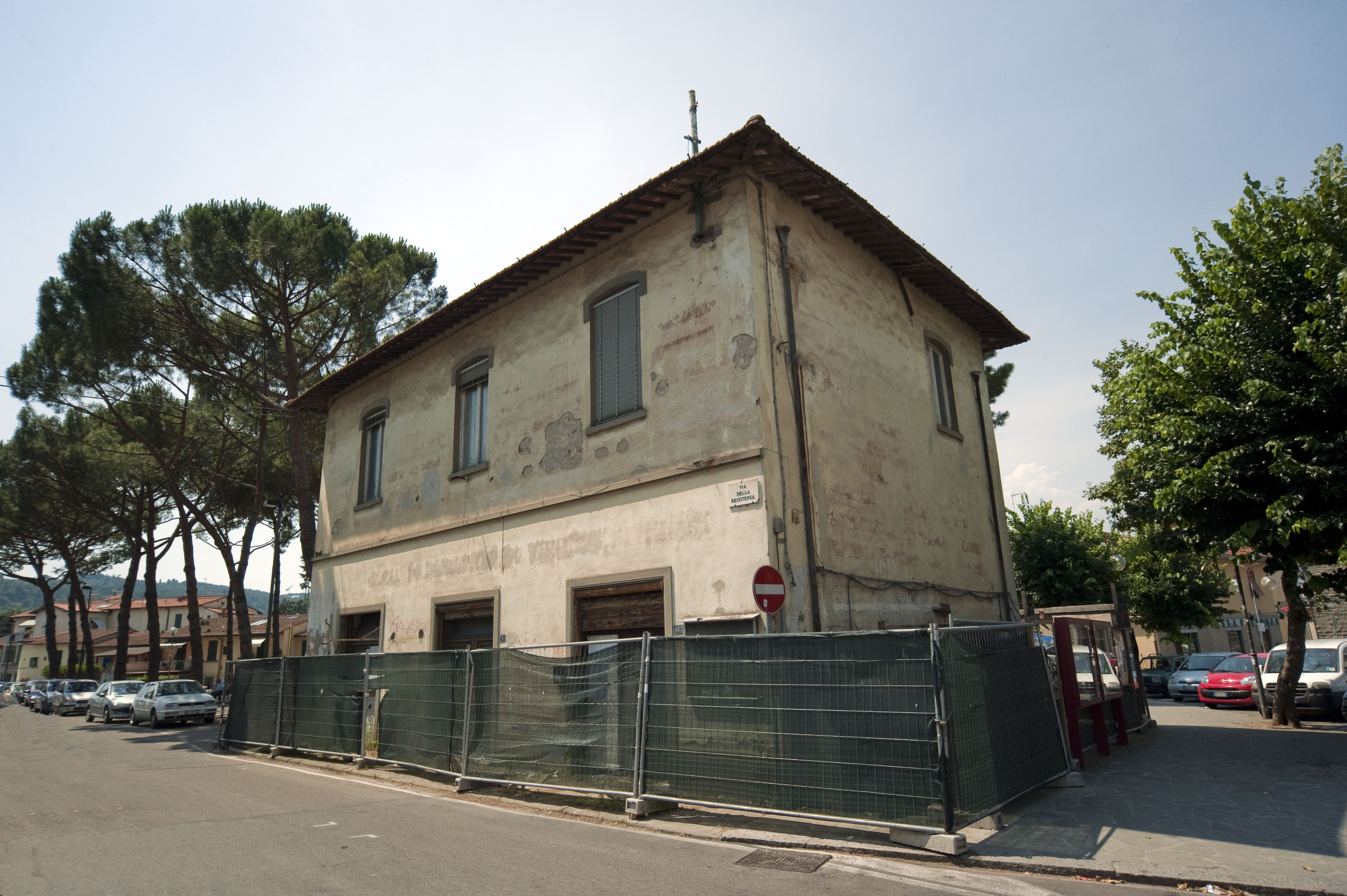
Tavarnuzze station in 2010.

His counterproposal, presented by engineer Tito Gori, envisioned a horse-drawn tramway along Viale dei Colli while the steam tramway was proposed to pass through the Carraia valley; in essence, the tramway immediately after taking Viale dei Colli would abruptly turn right to pass through Via dei Bastioni, then, for a stretch in its own seat along the Carraia valley, it would enter Viale Galileo and finally, through Viale Torricelli, rejoin the Lenci route. The proponents of this project preferred it because it passed through sparsely populated areas but above all because it did not pass through Viale dei Colli, where the villas of wealthy and influential personalities were located, terrified at the idea of having what they themselves called noisy rabble pass in front of their front doors; their thoughts, moreover, had already been well expressed by the petition submitted by engineer Gori:

The thought that that noble promenade, which is the pride and decorum of the city of Florence, should, having lost all its attractiveness and the elegant character that distinguishes it, find itself reduced to the ungracious location of a steam tramway for the transportation of the goods and livestock of San Casciano and Greve, is abhorrent. Instance of the Section Chief of the Public Works Office of the City Hall Eng. Tito Gori to the Mayor of Florence, 1887.

Emanuele Fenzi's response was clear:

Firstly, one cannot seriously classify as a public promenade the entire stretch of the Avenue from the barrier of San Niccolò to Piazzale Michelangiolo, which is no less than 2,200 m. long. Not a soul is ever to be found there, and the City Hall knows it, and for watering they never spend a penny there, and in the matter of lighting you see one oil lamp placed there every 500 m.

In a second instance a request was made to move the track from the center of the roadway to one of the side avenues. Other protests came from both the Superintendent of Public Gardens and Promenades Angiolo Pucci, who feared damage to the trees, sidewalks and benches of the avenue, and again from Poggi, who lost the first assault and embraced the environmentalist cause with these words:

The steam emissions will certainly harm the plants close to the rail, and in the long run they will sadden even the most discrete ones; and so the walkway will become a street like any other.

But Fenzi had an answer for this supposed problem as well:

Among the 250 plane trees or a few more that are planted between the Cure and San Gervasio do you know which is by far the biggest, the tallest, the most leafy, the most beautiful of all in short? Precisely the one under which the locomotive of the San Domenico streetcar stops (note well) for at least 15 minutes every hour.

Emanuele Orazio Fenzi was a dynamic and persistent opponent who, exploiting Sonnino's influence, succeeded in convincing the Florence City Hall to totally accept his project. Bringing the matter to a close was Minister of Public Works Ubaldino Peruzzi, author of a polite but firm letter addressed to Poggi in which he closed the matter in favor of the original tramway project. Peruzzi wrote, among other things:

Does it really seem a great evil if some outsider, going to visit the Avenue of the Hills, sees for a moment a train of flasks of good Chianti wine passing by?

==== Limitations to the operation ====
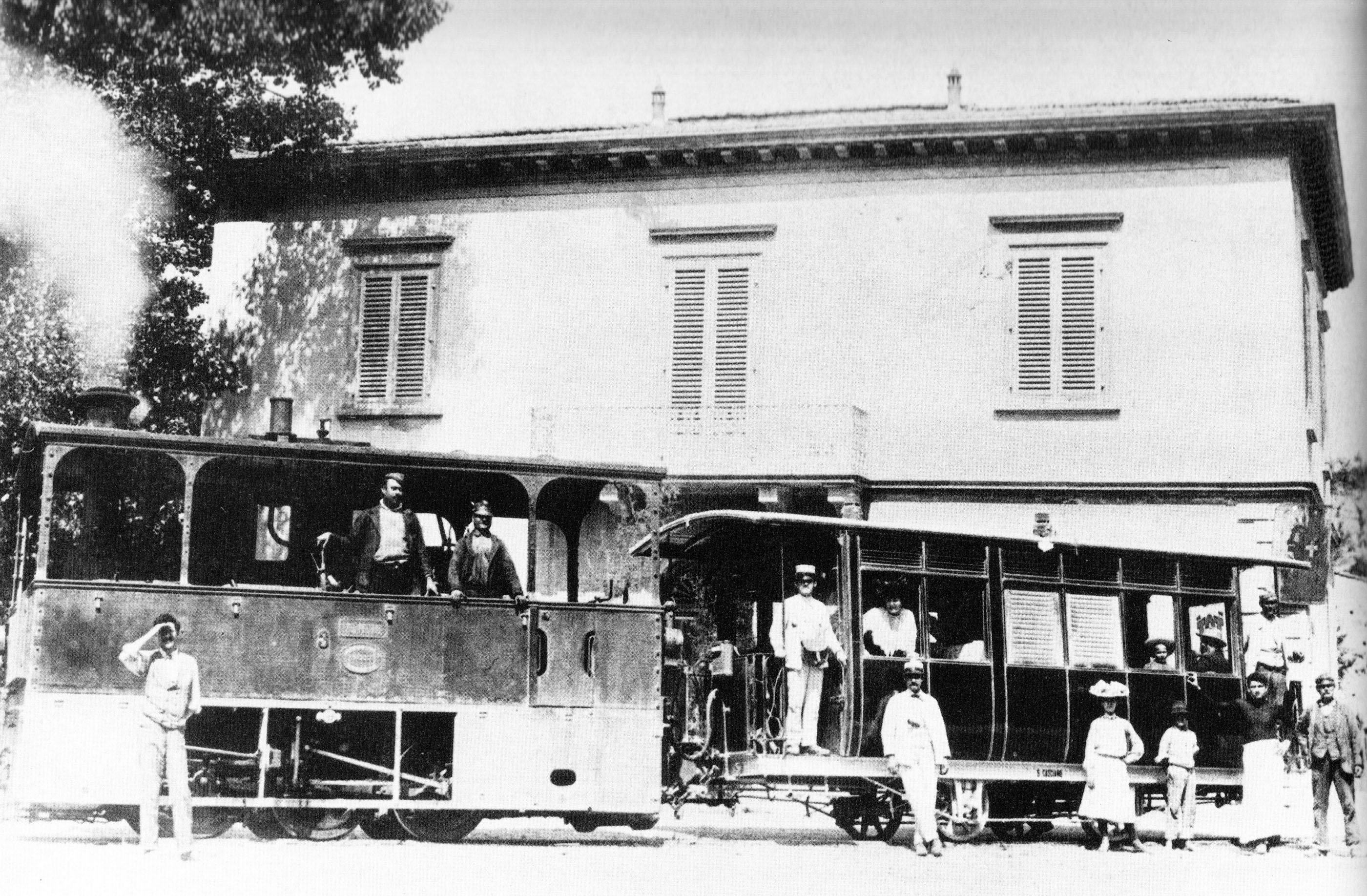
Falciani station in the early 1900s.

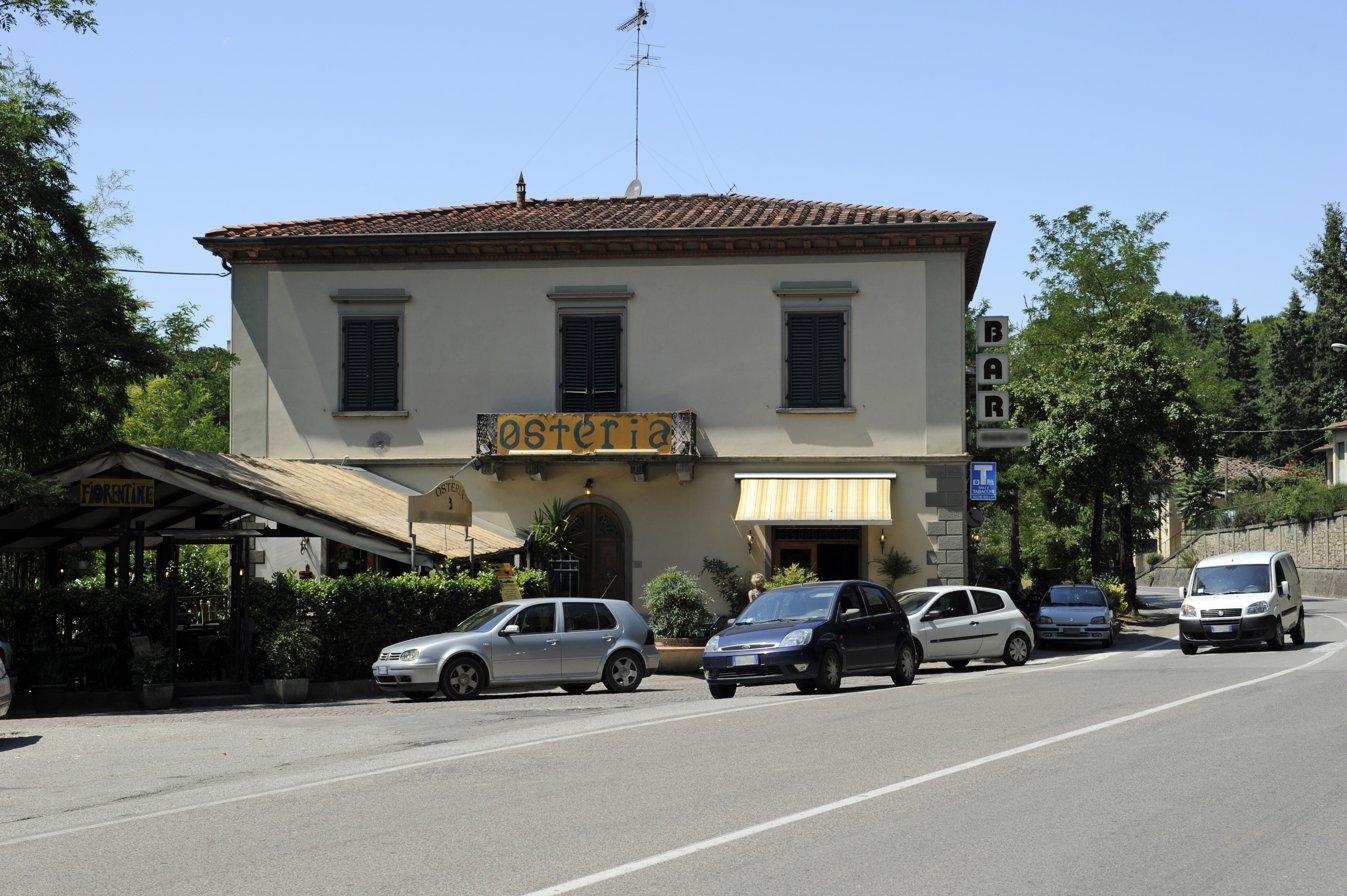
The Falciani station in 2010.

The municipality could not forget the demands of the wealthy residents of the Avenue of the Hills and so, in giving approval to the project, it inserted a whole series of regulations and clauses that caused the tramway a difficult and uneconomical operation, but which were probably inspired by an early embryonic concept of protecting the environment, the harmony of places and the privacy of residents.

- It was imposed on the tramway to have two terminuses: one at Porta alla Croce and one at Porta Romana; for the latter, studies were made for a possible extension up to the new customs barrier placed in Viale Petrarca (called Barriera di Sant'Orsola) and up to the suspension bridge at the Cascine;
- the line was to be equipped with telegraph service and later with telephone service, later installed at the behest of the operating company;
- each wagon was to have a compartment reserved for postal service;
- along the line progressive distances were to be signaled by signs placed every 500 and 1000 m, and in addition, for the section in its own seat, it was required to have the line guarded by two watchmen who were obliged to live in the localities served;
- in the section to San Casciano in Val di Pesa it was obligatory to have lifeline tracks, but on this the Ministry of Public Works intervened, which avoided the construction of the same, but imposed a maximum speed of 12 km/h and the obligation of the Hardy automatic continuous brake, so much so that the line was then built for this type of system although no evidence remains that it was actually in use;
- trains were forbidden to exceed 20 km/h and dual traction was prohibited (given the steep gradients of the track this rule sank any possible development of the service);
- service schedules had to be divided into winter and summer and be approved by the Prefecture whose opinion was unquestionable;
- freight trains were obliged to run only at night and in closed wagons, but even this was not enough, as the connection between the Porta alla Croce station and the Campo di Marte station was opposed with numerous bureaucratic loopholes including one that imposed the obligation of only one wagon per convoy, a rule that made the service insufficient and uneconomic;
- an obligation was imposed to place the tracks in the middle of the roadway of the avenues to allow public walking and transit of the carriages (this rule was enforced even in those curves where for technical needs the track could not remain in the middle of the roadway at further expense to the builder);
- finally, the municipality reserved the right to grant more authorizations for the use of the line to other concessionaires as well, but at least granted reimbursement for maintenance expenses that remained the responsibility of the builder.

==== The ministry's grant ====
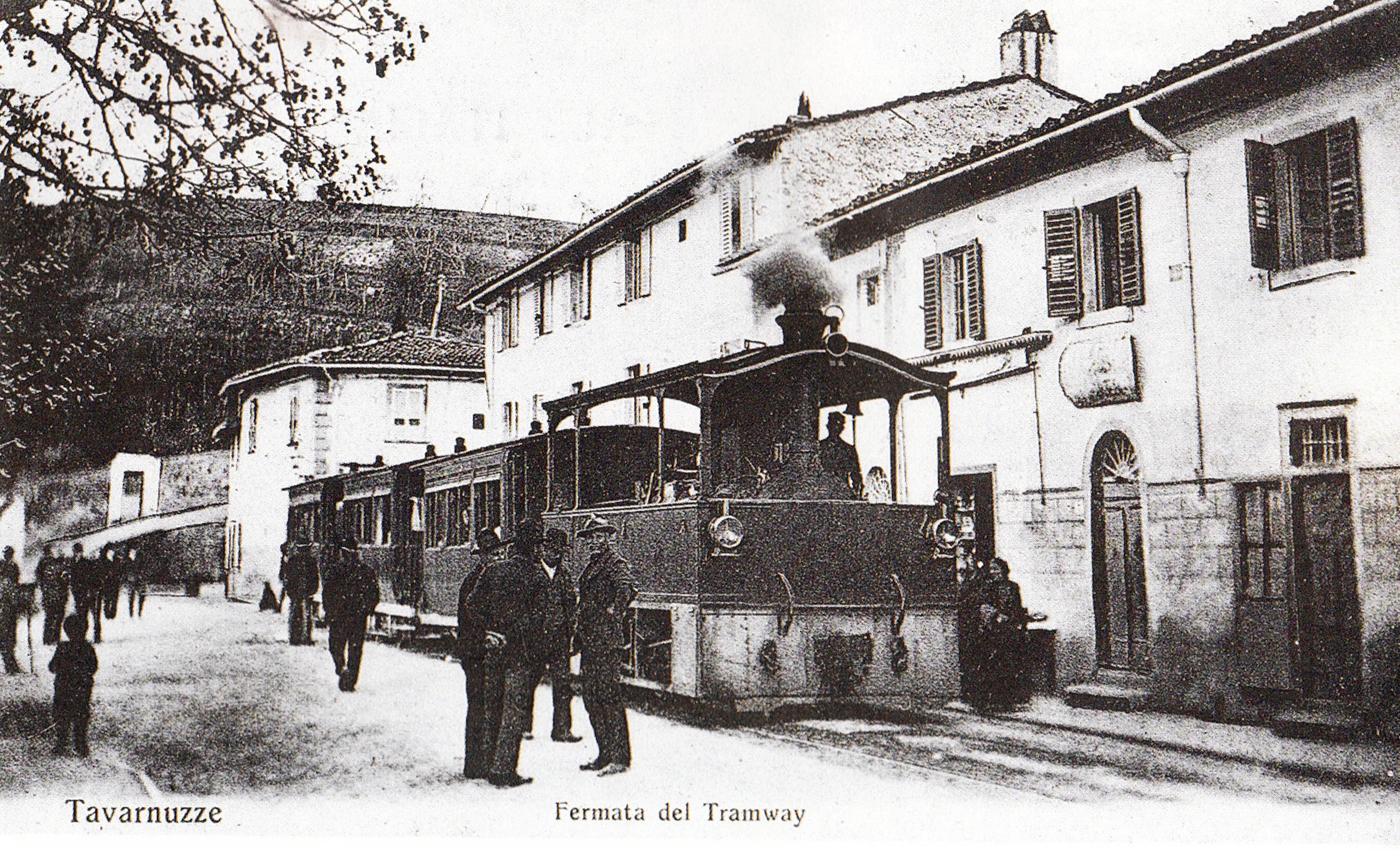
The original Tavarnuzze stop

The continuous interference and stances of the Florentine elite, which at times bordered on sheer violence, did not stop the project. If the municipality of Florence did everything in its power to hinder the project, quite different was the behavior of the municipalities of Greve in Chianti and San Casciano in Val di Pesa: the San Casciano municipality provided a non-repayable grant of 110,000 liras (later increased to 140,000 liras) for 20 years in favor of the Fenzi company to build the line.

The application to the Ministry of Transportation was submitted on 18 August 1888, and the decree was signed on 18 December 1888, by Minister Giuseppe Saracco. The text of the decree read as follows:

Authorization to the company Emanuele Fenzi e C. to build and operate with steam traction a tramway from the railway station of Florence-Porta alla Croce to Greve and San Casciano on the basis of the project of Engineer Giuseppe Lenci. Decree of the Ministry of Transportation, 18 December 1888.

Once the go-ahead was given for the work, the Società Italiana per la Tramvia del Chianti e dei Colli Fiorentini was established in 1889 with headquarters in Piazza della Signoria.

=== Start of service ===
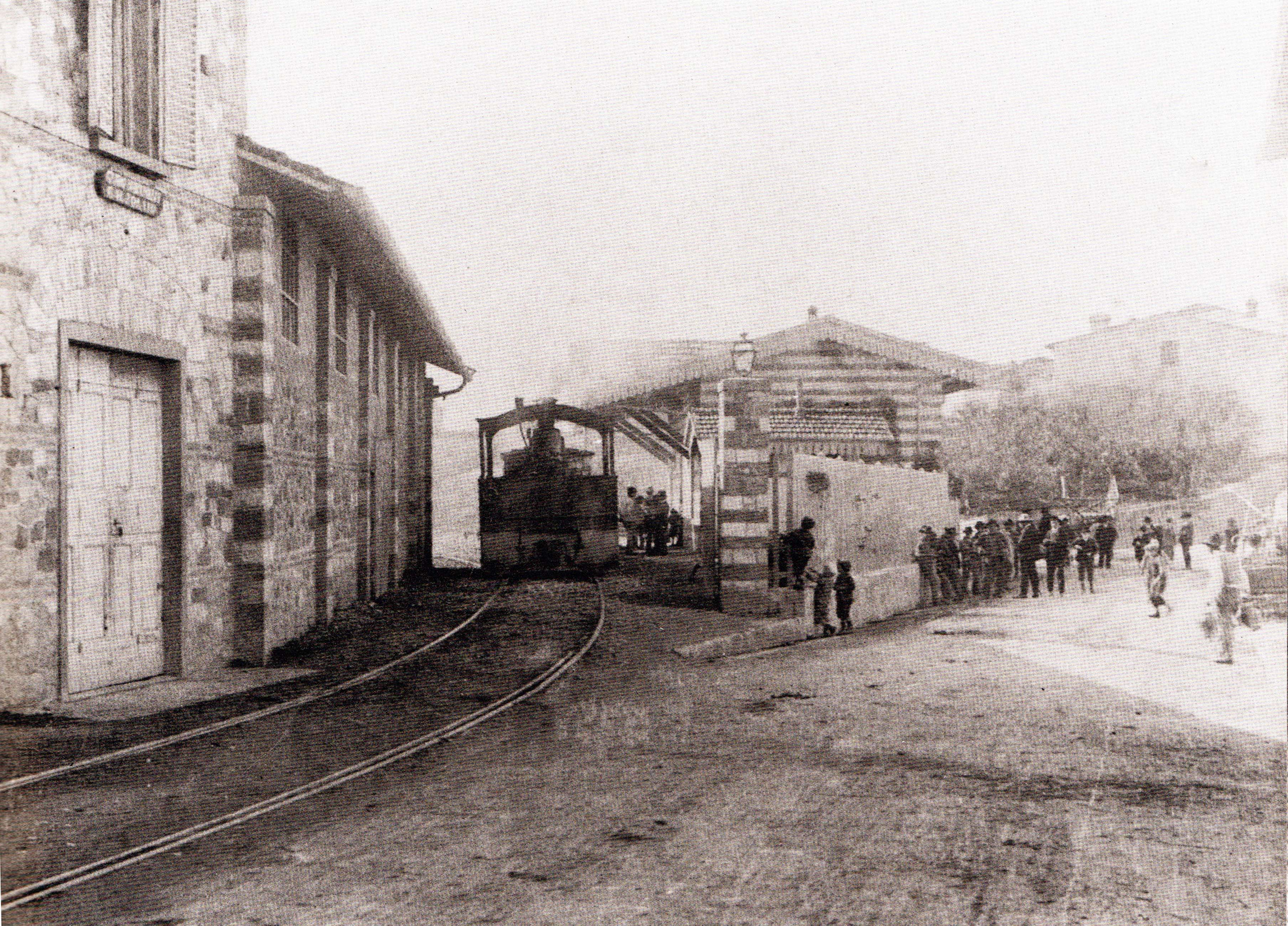
Convoy departing from San Casciano station.

The tramway was officially inaugurated on 3 April 1893, but opening to traffic was by individual sections as they were completed. The history of the inaugurations is as follows:

- 12 March 1890 from Porta Romana to Tavarnuzze (6900 m)
- 20 May 1890 from Barrier of San Niccolò to the confluence with the previous section (4600 m)
- 5 August 1890, from Porta alla Croce to Barrier of San Niccolò (450 m)
- 5 August 1890, from Tavarnuzze to Ponte dei Falciani (5690 m)

On the occasion of the opening of the line to the Falciani in La Nazione of 13 July 1890 was reported:

Today for the first time the locomotive arrived at the Falciani Bridge, that is, at the foot of the San Casciano rise, exactly two years after the resolution granting the concession for this line. Eighteen kilometers of the line are already open or about to be opened, including the beautiful Bridge over the Arno. Work on the San Casciano ascent is already well advanced. The Gelsomino station is now completed.

- 21 May 1891, from the Falciani Bridge to San Casciano in Val di Pesa (4350 m) and with this the branch line to San Casciano in Val di Pesa was completed for a length of 16.640 m.

For the Greve line the inaugurations were:

- 19 February 1891, from Ponte dei Falciani to Ferrone (5,000 m)
- 21 May 1891, from Ferrone to Passo dei Pecorai (4890 m)
- 1 March 1893, from Passo dei Pecorai to Greve in Chianti station.

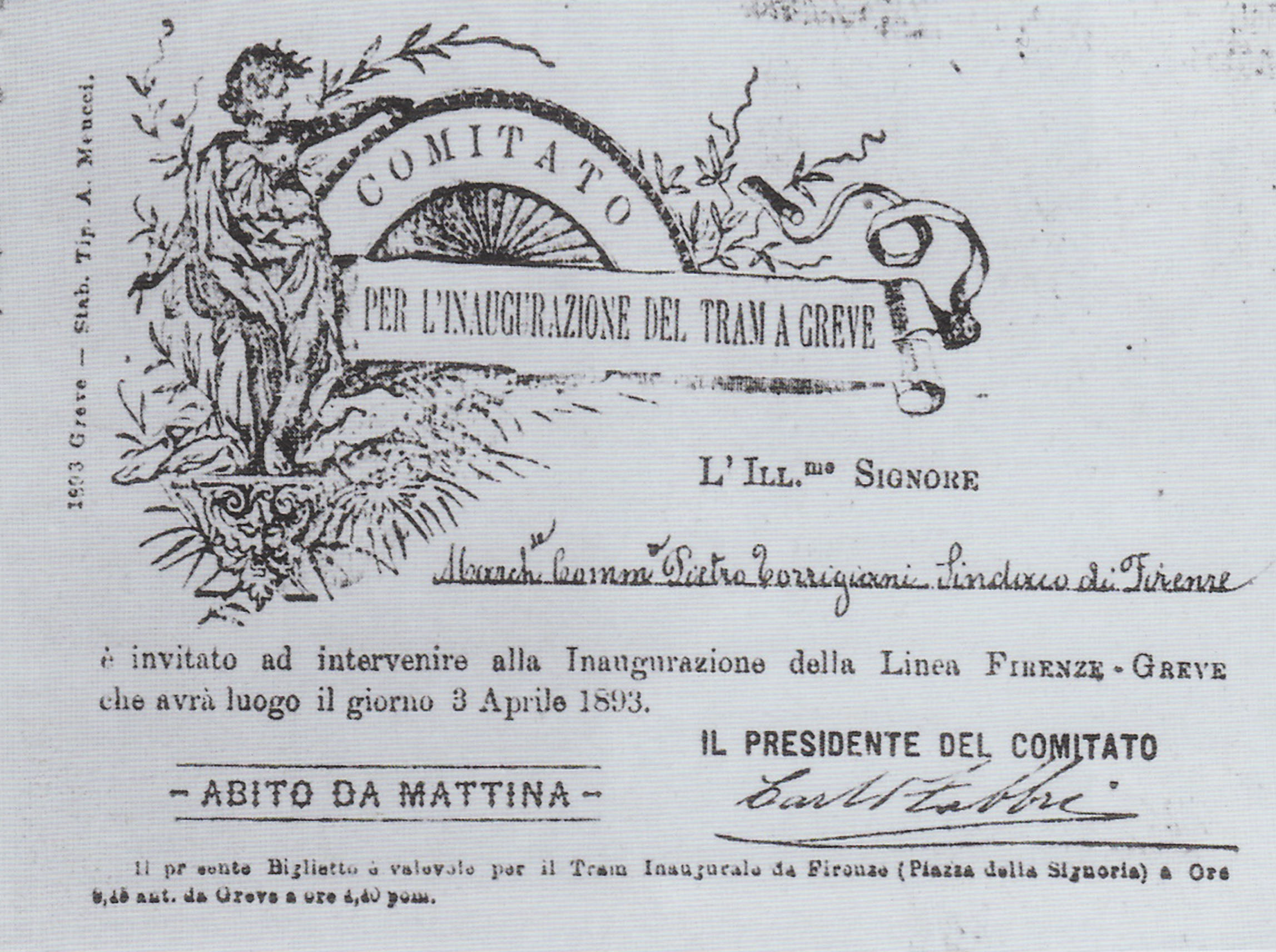
Invitation card for the opening of the line at Greve in Chianti (1893)

On 29 March 1893 the final testing of the entire line, including the branch line to San Casciano, took place; the testing was carried out by Engineer Edgardo Alessandro of the Civil Engineer's Office.

==== Inauguration at San Casciano in Val di Pesa ====
The magazine "Il Chianti" of 31 May 1891 reported on the opening of the Falciani-San Casciano section:

[...] Sunday the 24th was a day of celebration for this event. [...] At 10 a.m., at the Niccolini Theater, some prizes were drawn for the benefit of the members of the Workers' Society and Military Brotherhood, then a committee of working-class members, the Esteemed President Cav. Adolfo Giunti went to the villa Fenzi and presented, on behalf of the entire society a parchment to the One who, faithful to the family business traditions, wanted the construction of the Tramway Society. The committee presenting the parchment, a very fine work dictated by the good notary Faustino Chiti and executed by Cav. Luigi Davani, was received with exquisite kindness that is proper to the Fenzi family, who, in the afternoon hours were pleased to come among us.

==== From the bankruptcy of Fenzi Bank to the opening in Greve in Chianti ====
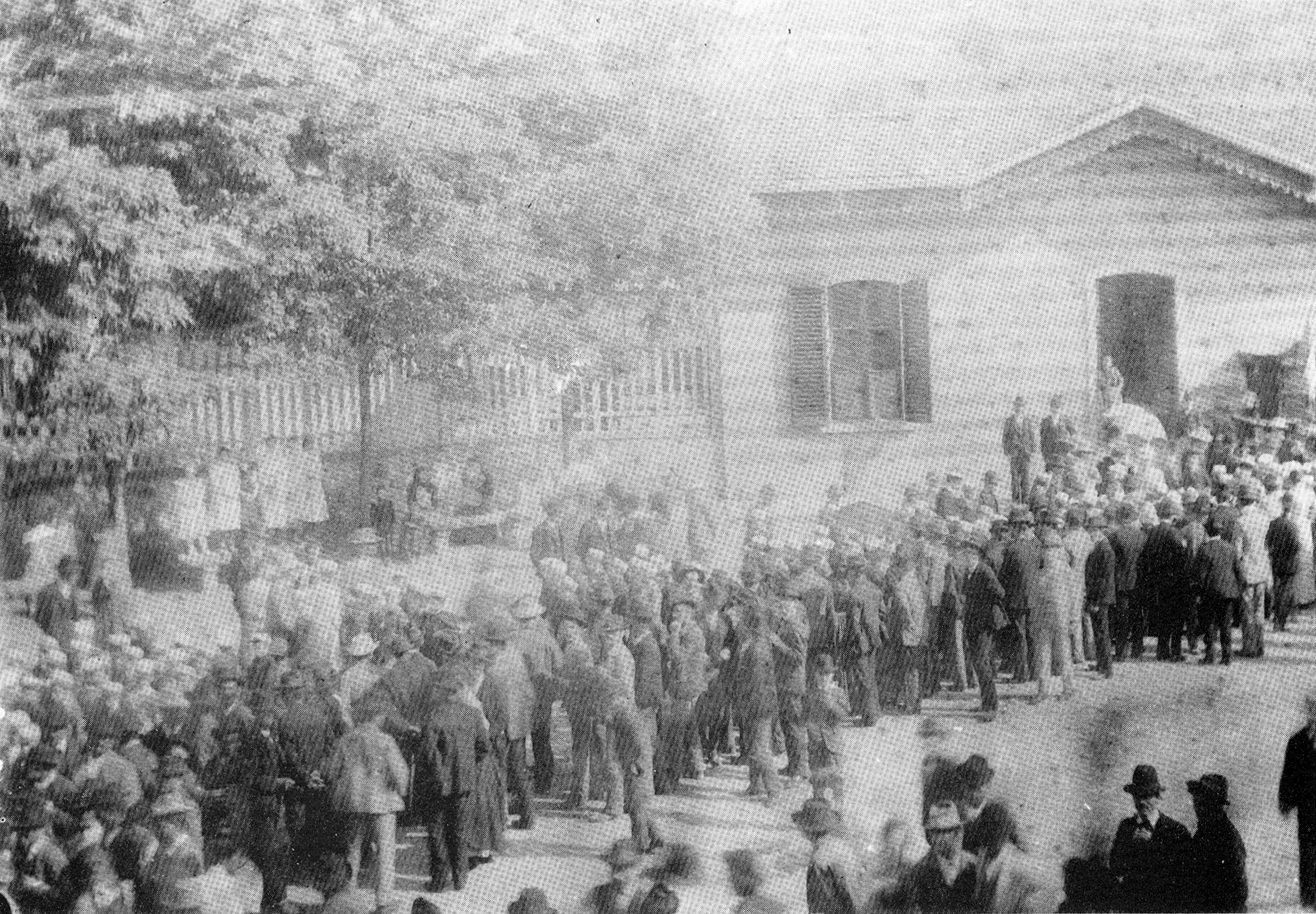
Greve in Chianti station on 23 November 1893, on the day of its inauguration

Shortly after the inauguration of the section to San Casciano, work on the Greve line first had an abrupt slowdown and later came to a halt. In January 1892 the Fenzi Bank declared bankruptcy, the consequence of which was a halt to work on the tramway. After the bankruptcy of its major shareholder, the Società per la Tramvia del Chianti e dei Colli Fiorentini continued to provide service on the existing lines but was ordered to pay debts to creditors. The situation was resolved on 24 September 1892, when the company's board of directors accepted the purchase offer, for 1,750,000 liras, made by Ferdinando Cesaroni of Genoa. On the following 26 October the notarial deed of sale was drawn up and the new company exercising Tranvai Fiorentini was established, which had its administrative direction in Florence at Via dell'Arcivescovado 3. (Note: Later the company moved first to Via delle Cascine 33 then from 1899 to Viale Militare (now Viale dei Mille) No. 87, where the ATAF headquarters is still located today. Uleri (1999, p. 26).)

Work resumed and the line was completed as well as the inauguration party in Greve. The first train arrived in Greve in Chianti at 12:08 a.m. on Monday 3 April 1893.

At each inauguration, large parties were held, testifying to the enormous enthusiasm and equal expectations for the work. In the article published by La Nazione on 5 April 1893, the day of the arrival in Greve, it is written that the guests gathered in Piazza della Signoria where, accompanied by the sound of the fanfare, they boarded three first-class carriages; these carriages, drawn by horses, led the guests to the tramway station located at the place called the Pratoni di Porta alla Croce (today the intersection of Viale Antonio Gramsci and Viale Giuseppe Mazzini), where they were hitched to the locomotive "Niccolò da Uzzano." The engineer of the maiden voyage was Lorenzo Boninsegni, the stoker was Attilio Bisoni, and the conductor was Egisto Chelli, over all supervised by Cavalier Lenci. The 4-kilometer section (from the Casino Bridge to the Rimaggio Bridge), which passed through a narrow gorge of the Greve River below the Vicchiomaggio Castle, caused particular astonishment during the journey. There were as many as 6,000 people in Greve waiting for the train; the town was decked out in flags and to welcome the convoy were eleven philharmonic orchestras playing the Marcia Reale in unison. On the day of the inauguration, the Greve station was not yet ready, so the train stopped at a temporary station 200 m downstream. Once disembarked, the passengers walked through the village where numerous triumphal arches were made along the way to the square. All the civil and religious authorities of the area were present in the square, among them the Honorable Sidney Sonnino.

The new management company headed by Cesaroni soon revealed itself as an enterprise aimed at mere financial speculation, so much so that the service was even worse than that provided by the previous company. Its adventure was short-lived, and between late 1896 and early 1897 the operating company was absorbed by the Société Générale des Chemins de Fer Economiques, which was based in Brussels and was therefore renamed the Belgian.

In the enthusiasm generated by the new tramway, the municipality of Greve became the promoter of a committee, which on 15 March 1897 drew up a plan for upgrading it and continuing it to Siena.

==== Electrification, inconveniences and accidents ====
On 26 July 1899 electrification of the line began; the first section where steam traction was abolished was from Porta alla Croce to Gelsomino. Later the new traction was extended as far as Tavarnuzze, which was reached on 16 September 1907, with many benefits for everyone; by this date the steam section had been reduced to about 33 km. With the beginning of electrification, inconveniences for Chianti travellers increased: when they arrived at the traction change, passengers were forced to be transferred, because it soon became clear that the electric locomotives were not capable of pulling the heavy convoys detached from the steam locomotive.

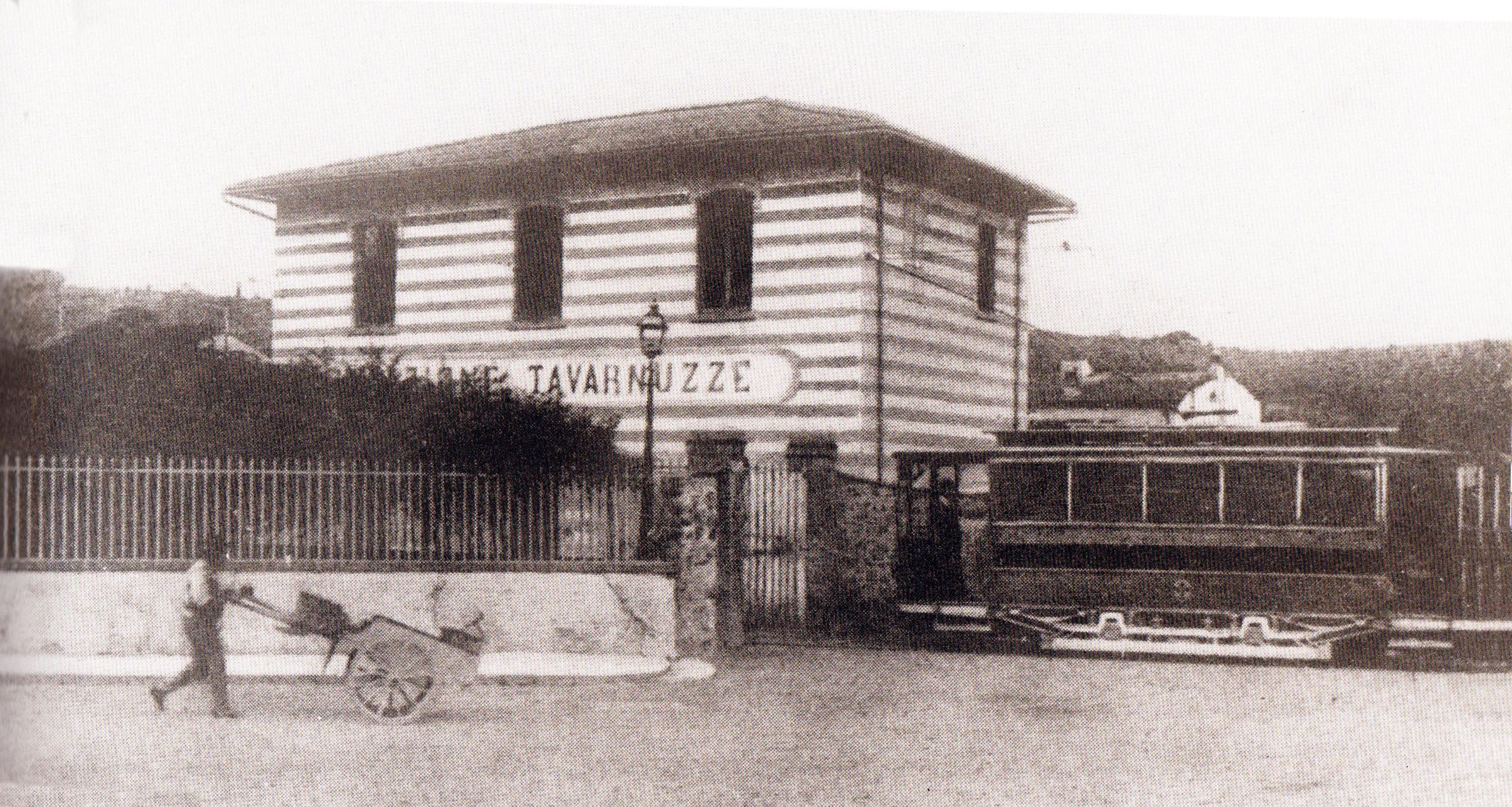
Electric streetcar parked in front of Tavarnuzze station

The burgeoning complications and the various necessary maintenance work led the operating company to reconsider the importance of the Chianti tramway, making it clear that it was destined for a slow but inexorable devitalization; on this the municipality of Greve waged a long battle for the defense of the tramway that lasted for thirty years.

However, in the golden years of the service, the problems were other. The inhabitants of the area of Viale Petrarca, that is, just beyond the terminus of Porta Romana where the rolling stock was parked, began to complain about the great noise that was made, even in the nighttime hours, by the movement of materials. The reasons for the complaints were understandable: an average of 66 convoys pulled by 120 hp locomotives passed under their windows, and in addition, freight cars were left parked along the tracks placed in the boulevard, which was inconceivable for the company at the time. The municipality of Florence intervened and prohibited the loading and unloading of goods between 3 p.m. and 5 p.m.

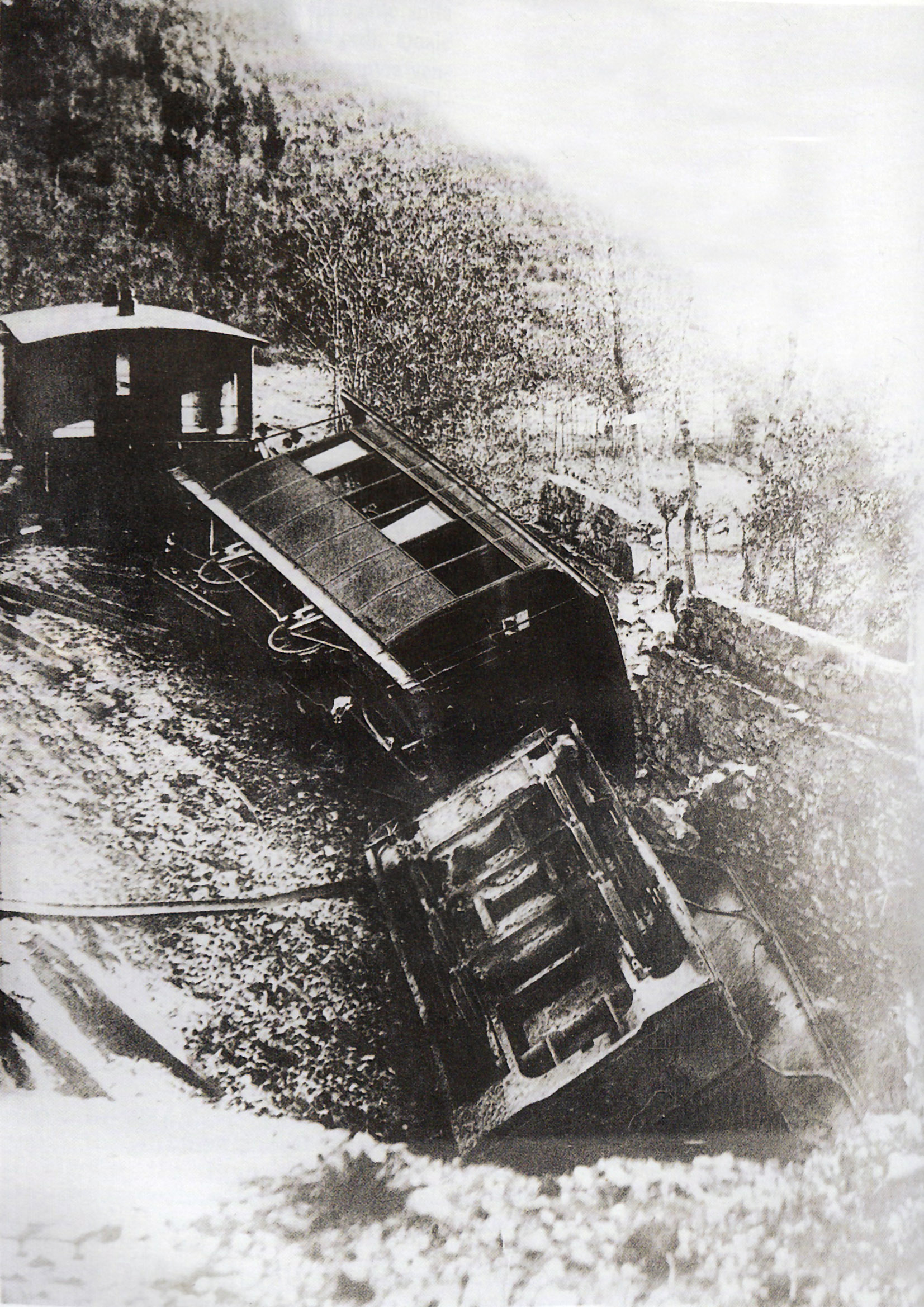
Incident of 13 November 1907

Travelers also had to face new problems: on 7 April 1900, the operating company was heavily fined because the 7:06 p.m. train left at 7:40 p.m. This had happened after workers with reduced fare tickets, unable to find space, had invaded the first-class carriages, to the dismay of wealthy travelers who reported the matter to the authorities and who were not satisfied even after at the Jasmine station the local stationmaster had another second-class carriage added for the invading workers. The first-class travelers made further grievances and at that point a second fine was raised for irregular composition of the convoy.

On 11 April 1903 the train from San Casciano that had arrived at 5:35 p.m. at the Poggio Imperiale corner got sidetracked, and bindings were used to put it back on the tracks. On 17 August that year, another far more serious incident occurred: the convoy coming from San Casciano took the downhill slope leading to Porta Romana at a high speed and, only thanks to the counter-steam and promptness of the conductors of the first and second carriages, managed to stop in time; (Note: The conductors also had the task of brakemen.) the failure to brake had not been caused by a mechanical failure but by the absence of the conductor of the third carriage who had not shown up for duty. Upon learning of the incident and heedless of the fact that there had been no injuries, the City of Florence made a whole series of intimidations to the conductors who responded by trying to get an overblown event back on track. The story found a conclusion only after the management company took disciplinary action against the train conductor.

In the following years there were two other serious accidents; one occurred on the morning of 13 November 1907 at Testi, when due to a landslide caused by the heavy rains of the previous days, the track on which the train was running plunged into the Greve River causing numerous injuries; the balance of this accident was modest thanks to the valor of engineer Giuseppe Testi, who perceived the subsidence of the ground: sensing the derailment he managed to brake by operating the counter-steam. The locomotive overturned and Testi and his stoker were trapped inside; only later were they rescued. For his act, the mayor of Greve awarded the engineer a solemn commendation and a cash prize. Another serious accident occurred on 11 December 1913 at Le Strette, near Falciani, when two convoys coming from opposite directions collided head-on: this time, too, there were numerous injuries and the two locomotives were destroyed.

The second accident was an opportunity to plead on behalf of all Chianti's citizens for a safer, faster service, with a greater number of runs, and above all to demand, again, that the entire line be electrified. Electrification of the entire line was planned, but not implemented, as a new, cheaper and more efficient means of transportation was beginning to appear on the market: the bus.

=== The decline ===
==== Competition from the bus ====
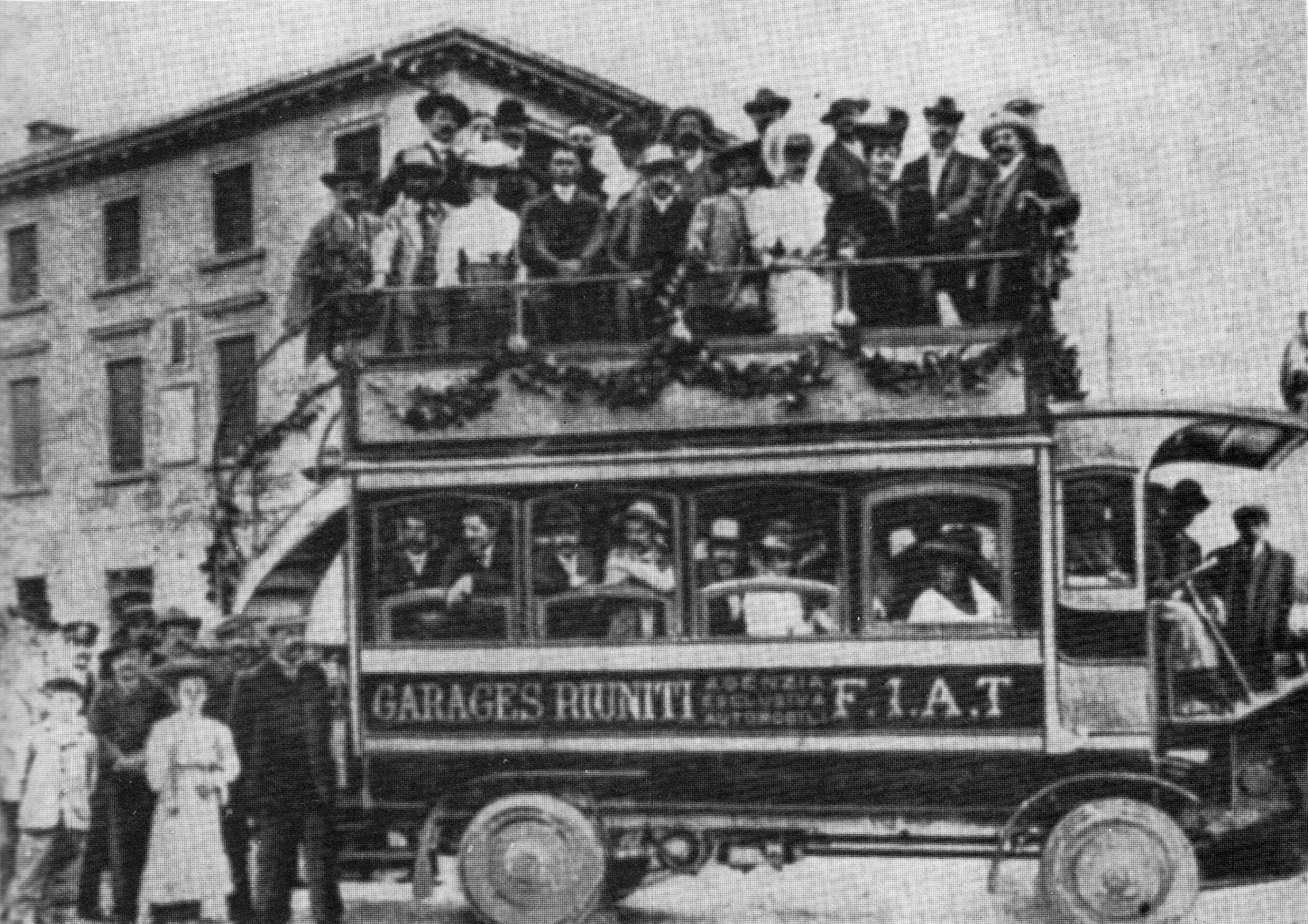
The inauguration of automobile service on the Florence-San Casciano-Siena route in 1922

The first public transport buses did not start running in Florence until 1927, but on the suburban lines the service had been operating for some time. In the years leading up to World War I, SITA had managed to obtain, on an experimental basis, to operate a service on the Florence-Siena line via Greve. The service was discontinued during the war, but was resumed soon after. Competition between the bus and the tramway had begun.

The "cafeteria," (Note: The popular affection that surrounded this tram service led to the creation of numerous nicknames, in addition to the aforementioned Cafeteria. Nicknames include: Strascicapoeri, Macinino, Mangiacarbone, Sputafuoco, Tram con la sottana, Tram Nero, Trenino del Chianti, Vaporiera and the typically Florentine Tramme. Baldini & Calamandrei (2003, p. 186).) as the locomotive that served on this line was kindly called, was now no longer able to meet the needs of users. There were many reasons for this: there were few runs, at Tavarnuzze it was obligatory to transfer because of the different traction system (from electric to steam and vice versa) resulting in longer travel times, times that were already long (from Greve in Chianti to Porta Romana took about two hours (1 1/2 hours from San Casciano in Val di Pesa). In 1917 SITA began running regular bus routes on the Florence-Siena and Florence-Volterra lines with a passage to San Casciano in Val di Pesa via Falciani. By bus, San Casciano in Val di Pesa was connected with the center of Florence in about thirty-five to forty minutes.

In order to protect the tramway, the Florence Railway Inspectorate required SITA to run its buses no longer from Falciani, but from Via Volterrana, with a huge lengthening of time. This decision caused a long dispute between the municipal administration of San Casciano in Val di Pesa and the Inspectorate. This situation still lasted in 1928, when the Podestà of San Casciano in Val di Pesa, General Michele Polito, sent a heartfelt appeal to the Ministry of Transportation, describing the problem:

The SITA service for the Florence-Falciani-San Casciano section modestly makes up for the much-claimed deficiency in tram service. Is it permissible today, then, that a town like San Casciano, which is only 16 kilometers from Florence and is full of agricultural and commercial life, should be content with only three streetcar departures a day, carried out with two old carriages and sometimes with only one, mixed, for passenger freight service? The Tramway Company has never been willing, due to a series of not too justifiable circumstances, to accommodate proposals to run an auxiliary service, as would be the SITA service at different hours to the tramway departures. The variation made to the itinerary of the automobile services in the San Casciano-Florence section and vice versa, and the tram service disservice have put this region in the condition of having to compare itself to any other country in regard to means of communication: clear proof of this are the deficient and impossible timetable of streetcar departures and the vicious itinerary of the automobile service with which it often takes two hours to reach the city, while 30 minutes should be more than enough. (Note: Excerpt from the petition of General Polito, mayor of San Casciano to the Ministry of Communications dated 1928 and reported in Pampaloni (2003, pp. 18–19).)

In 1928 SITA also entered the affair and made it known that it would very much like to be allowed to return to the previous route, the via Falciani route, but in the alternative it was also fine with going through the via degli Scopeti.

A new appeal was submitted to the ministry by the podestà of San Casciano on 21 December 1928, in which improvements to the rolling stock were requested, and finally a very last petition was submitted on 27 February 1929 to the "Direzione dei Tramways fiorentini." In that appeal, in addition to the return of the buses to the more convenient line, a request was also made for an upgrade of the tramway line with the establishment of a fourth pair of runs on the Florence-San Casciano in Val di Pesa section, obtaining in response a sharp refusal thus justified:

the high cost of steam lines not offset by the low traffic.

==== The battle in defense of the service ====
The appeals of the San Casciano mayor described a real situation. Already by the beginning of the 20th century, the intensely used line appeared worn out, so much so that in 1906 the municipalities of San Casciano in Val di Pesa and Greve in Chianti had been forced to take legal action against the operating company because of its deplorable state. World War I exacerbated the crisis and a trip on the tramway became a real adventure: timetables were not respected and the condition of the line deteriorated to the point that it no longer offered the slightest safety. Inefficiencies were also due to the use of Valdarno lignite instead of coal, which was used for wartime purposes, and to the fact that the staff had been sent under arms. It got to the point that often, during the journey, passengers had to get off and go into the woods to cut some wood to fuel the train. With the conflict over, coal slowly began to return but little maintenance was done to the rolling stock: the economic situation of the Tramways Company was desperate and all improvements were postponed until a future date.

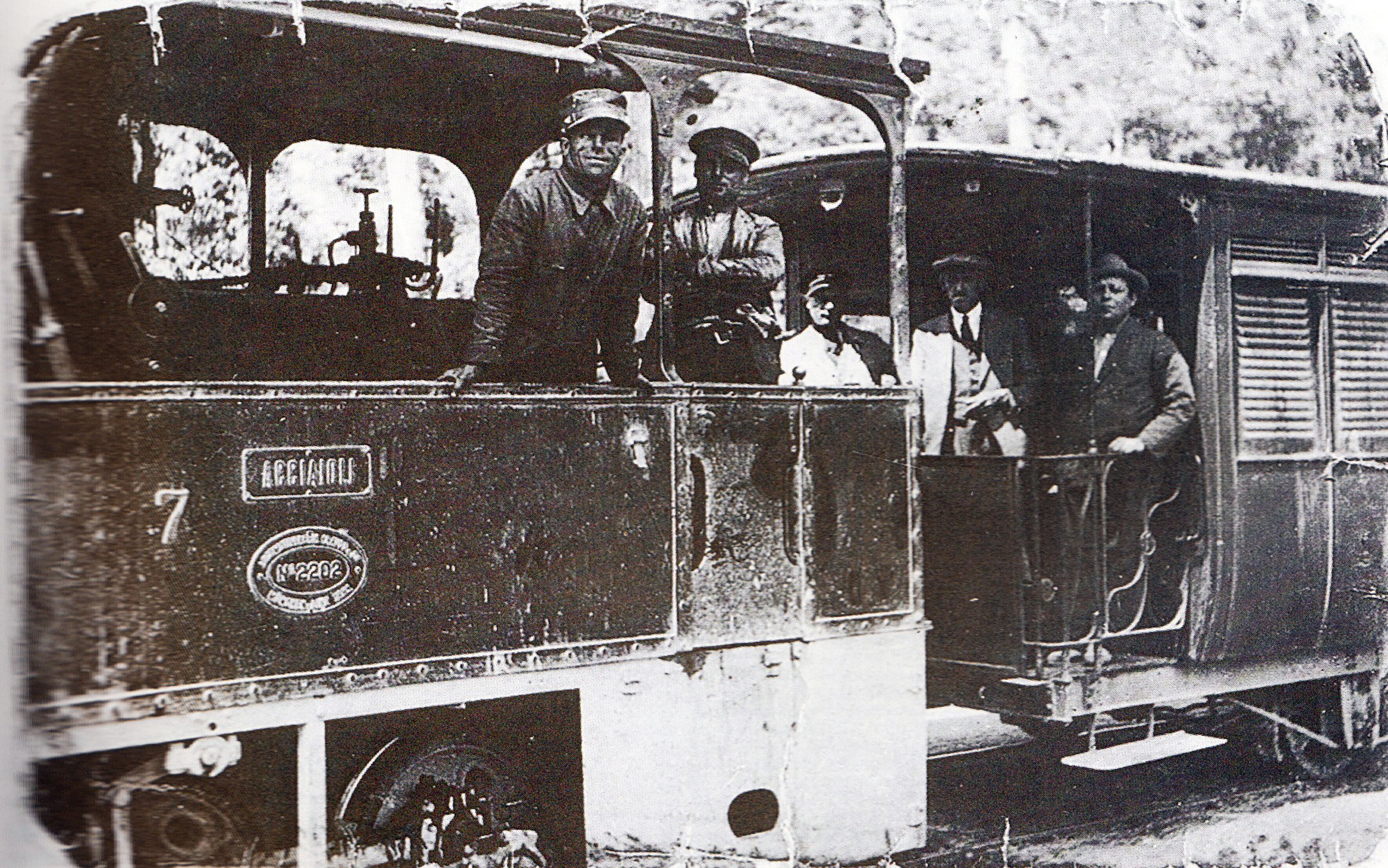
Locomotive No. 7 "Acciaioli," with engineer Giovanni Furini and stoker Giovanni Barucci

In 1921 the operating company first proposed to electrify the line but soon after changed plans and chose to replace the rail tram service with buses. The municipalities of Greve in Chianti and, to a lesser extent, that of San Casciano in Val di Pesa strenuously opposed it, so the plan was, for the time being, shelved.

The difference in reaction between the two municipalities was due to the fact that for San Casciano in Val di Pesa losing the tramway all things considered was almost a bargain: to maintain it it had to shell out a large sum each year while being aware that its inhabitants would not use it, preferring, for personal transport, the more convenient buses, even though they had a 20% higher fare than the tramway, while for freight transport trucks were now quite common. In Greve in Chianti, on the other hand, the tramway was well accepted.

In 1932 the Belgian Company, operator of the Chianti line and since 1926 of all the electrified and steam networks in the Florentine area, made it known that it wanted to suppress the line, just as in the years immediately following the end of the war the other steam lines had been gradually suppressed.

Most notable in this second battle was the magazine "Il Chianti," which was printed in Greve, (Note: Il Chianti was a weekly newspaper published in Greve in Chianti continuously from 1890 to 1944; it can be consulted on microfilm in the Periodicals Room of the National Central Library in Florence under the location: GE.III.3025.) which published between February and March 1932 a whole series of articles arguing for the indispensability of the tramway and its irreplaceability with other means of transportation. In order to keep it alive they asked the operators to engage in expensive modernization work and also in lowering fares, which was seen as the real reason for the line's crisis. But it was precisely the higher operating costs that had led to the decision to abolish it. They also called for adjustments to the route, the replacement of steam locomotives with diesel-powered railcars, the elimination of minor stops, and the revisiting of freight rates, which had enormous costs, so much so that a parcel shipped from Campo di Marte station to Greve paid four times the freight rate from Campo di Marte to any Italian location.

In its battle Greve in Chianti also appealed to Minister Galeazzo Ciano, to no avail, but mainly tried to involve the municipality of San Casciano in Val di Pesa. In a heartfelt appeal to his colleague from San Casciano, the podestà of Greve in Chianti not only asked for support but also veiledly let it be known, as a warning, that the battle was supported by two very high ranking members of the Fascist regime. In response, the podestà of San Casciano in Val di Pesa, on behalf of the population, asked the Prefect of Florence for the suppression of the tramway and its replacement with more efficient means; in the missive he also declared that he felt offended by the way the editor of "Il Chianti" and the podestà of Greve had dragged him into the dispute without even contacting him and furthermore had not even rectified, as he had requested, these false news.

However, SITA's competition was tight: it now ran all the road services to San Casciano, to Mercatale, to Greve and to Siena.

==== End of service ====
Due to the accumulated debt owed to the Valdarno company, the Società dei Tramvai Fiorentini e del Chianti went bankrupt on 24 September 1934 by a ruling of the Civil Court of Florence. Everything belonging to the company was purchased by the City of Florence.

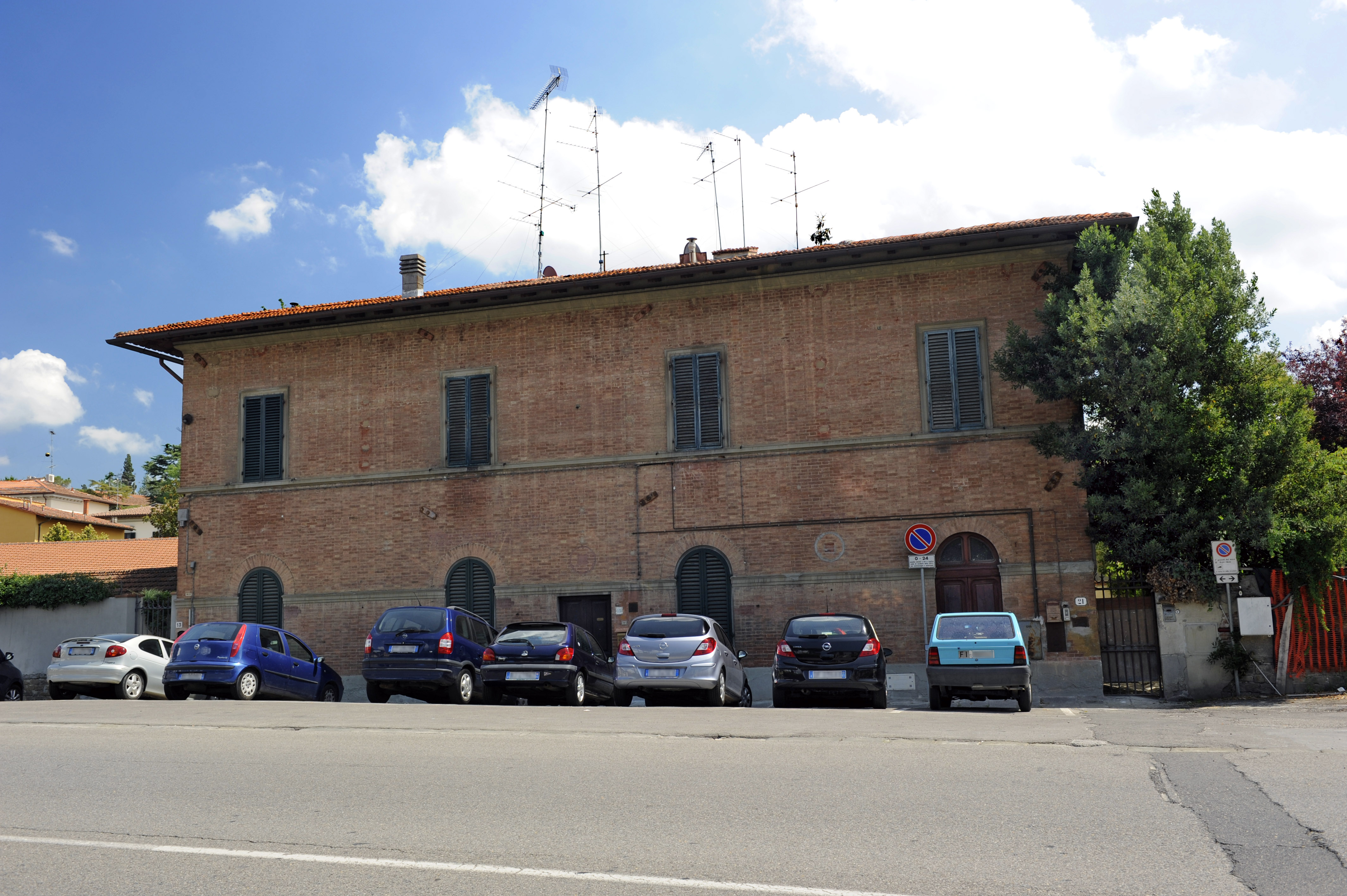
The building that housed the Gelsomino station.

The line was discontinued on 31 July 1935 after 45 years of operation, and with it the suburban steam network in the Florentine area ceased to exist. The tramway had been permanently replaced by SITA's red coaches, called precisely "the Reds." The last run from San Casciano in Val di Pesa took place the next day when a freight train departed at 5 p.m., collecting everything it could load.

The locomotive was the "Vittoria" and at the wheel was engineer Giovanni Furini. In Greve in Chianti, on the other hand, the service ended on the same 31 July, when a freight train left the station with all the material to be taken away. The locomotive was number 10 "Greve" and left at 8:15 p.m.

The service then passed to STU-FIAT, which under an agreement with the municipality of Florence had obtained exclusive rights both over the operation of all urban and suburban tramway lines in the Florentine area active at that time and the management of all lines that would be established during the 9-year concession period. The new service was to be operated on FIAT-owned vehicles; these vehicles were to have a seating capacity of 35-40. FIAT was to guarantee a minimum of 4 pairs of daily rides between Florence and Greve and a minimum of 8 daily rides between Florence and San Casciano; FIAT relied on the company SITA to run the service. It was also to guarantee a freight service, but this was never carried out, so much so that in 1937 the magazine "Il Chianti" wrote:

[...] Since the Florence-Greve tram service was abolished, and it has now been over two years, we have had no regular and continuous connection for the transportation of goods to and from the Campo di Marte. If Greve had not had local private firms engaged in trucking, it would have remained out of even any relation to the commercial railway station in the city in which all our traffic is headed....

The closure of the tramway thus led to a worsening of the economic situation of several Chianti companies.

The staff was absorbed by the Florentine tramways, the equipment dismantled, and in the spring of 1940 the rails were torn up as a gift to the Fatherland. One of the old engines was sent to the Carrara quarries and repurposed to transport marble blocks. The boiler of the "Pier Vettori" locomotive was brought to the management offices and used for years as a heating system. The Greve in Chianti station building had already been flanked by SITA garages since 1912 and continued to serve as a bus terminal and municipal warehouse until 1970 when it was torn down; a bus stop still stands in its place, and housing has been built in the area once designated for rail development. The Sancascian station had a similar fate: a bus stop and later the headquarters of the local agrarian consortium. The passenger building was torn down in December 1983, and a parking lot was built in the area behind it.

Tavarnuzze station had a different fate: the building (called "the skittle" by the locals) is still standing although it is in a state of total abandonment, but a parking lot and a pine forest with a public park are built around it. Since 2013 the station has been involved in the Tavarnuzze square modernization project; the Jasmine station is also standing and in excellent condition, converted back to private use. With the exception of the removal of the rails nothing has changed in the buildings at the Falciani, Passo dei Pecorai and Gabbiano bridge stops, which house trattorias. Everything else has disappeared.

== Characteristics ==
The line was an isolated single-track interurban tramway.

=== Route ===
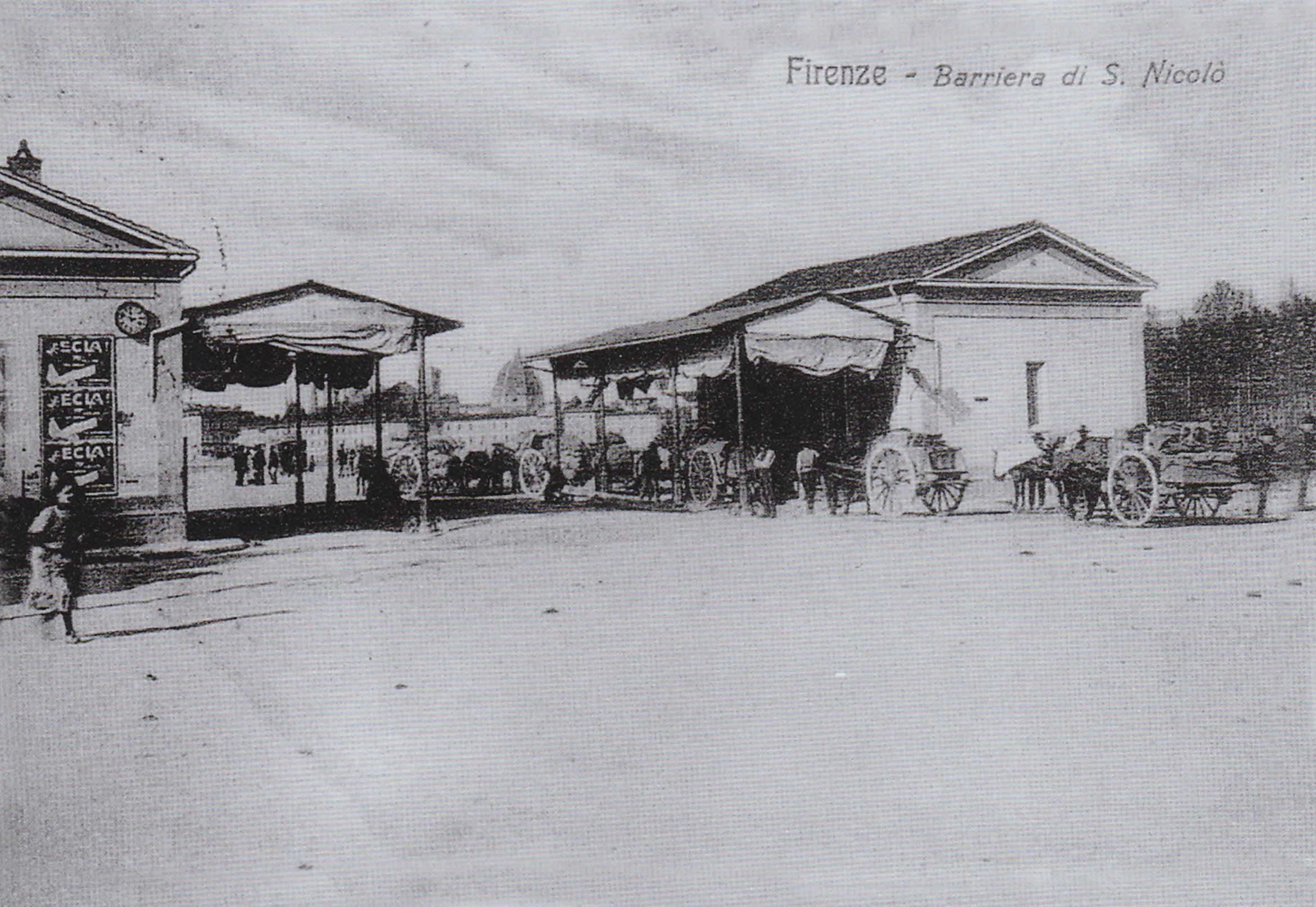
The San Niccolò barrier

According to the test report of 20 May 1892, the Chianti tramway from Florence to Greve in Chianti ran 6887 m on municipal roads, 23594 m on provincial roads and 5766 m in its own track; the branch line to San Casciano in Val di Pesa ran 3388 m on provincial roads and 1002 m in its own track with a gradient always contained within 60 per thousand.

The main terminus was in Piazza Beccaria, then known as Porta alla Croce, where there was no real station, so that convoys stopped in the center of the square; also from Piazza Beccaria began the branch line to the Campo di Marte railway station for the exclusive use of freight convoys, while passengers had to make the journey on foot.

Leaving the main terminus, the streetcar entered the Viale Duca di Genova (later Viale Giovanni Amendola), popularly called the "Pratoni della Zecca" (where the State Archives are located), and headed toward the Arno. Its first stop was at the Piazza della Zecca Vecchia (the area between Piazza Piave and Lungarno Pecori-Giraldi) from which it would depart and then cross the river on the new iron bridge. In place of the suspended bridge of San Ferdinando, built in 1837, an iron one capable of supporting the weight of the train was soon built, which was named after San Niccolò and was tested on 8 July 1890, with the simultaneous transit of two locomotives and two carriages pushed at a speed of 20 km/h. Once over the river, a large customs barrier was located in what is now Piazza Francesco Ferrucci: the Barrier of San Niccolò, which the streetcar passed on the right through a crossing made in the city wall.

From there onward the streetcar began to travel along Viale dei Colli: Viale Michelangelo to the square of the same name, then along Viale Galileo to Piazzale Galileo, near which was the Tivoli garden; from Piazzale Galileo the streetcar turned left along viale Torricelli to the crossroads with Viale del Poggio Imperiale, where it rejoined the trunk started at Piazzale di porta Romana (the second Florentine terminus), which transited precisely along the steep Viale del Poggio Imperiale.

After the intersection, the streetcar would travel along Via del Gelsomino, a street built specifically for tram service, where the tram station of the same name was located. In addition to the passenger building, the Gelsomino station included a large yard, repair shop and spare parts warehouse. After the electrification of the line, the Gelsomino station was decommissioned and the warehouse became a depot for electric vehicles.

The line then continued along Via Romana, now Via Senese, through the Due Strade suburb to the junction with Via di Malavolta where it was the border with the then Galluzzo municipality and where there was another customs barrier; having passed the barrier, the streetcar continued along the same Via Senese, passing through the built-up area of Galluzzo, grazing the Certosa, passing through the built-up area of I Bottai and the junction for Le Rose, after which it entered the built-up area of Tavarnuzze where there was another station, the building of which is still standing (as is the Gelsomino building), although initially the stop was located near the northern edge of the built-up area. The Tavarnuzze station building is located in the town's main square and was once equipped with a large yard, a well for supplying water to locomotives, and a coal depot. (Note: After the suppression of the tramway in place of the coal yard a pine forest was planted. According to a village tradition, the health of the pine trees is also due to the fact that they feed on the remains of the old coal yard. Uleri (1999, p. 104.)) Having passed the village of Tavarnuzze, the convoys passed through the Mulino del Diavolo locality, then through the Scopeti bridge locality and then launched into the plain formed by the Greve River (the area of the present-day American cemetery) to the narrow Bifonica gorge and shortly after reached the Falciani village, where a station equipped with a materials depot was located and where a bifurcation was placed: remaining on the main track they went to Greve in Chianti while with the other they went to San Casciano in Val di Pesa along a route characterized by a pronounced gradient.

The line to Greve, having passed the Cappello bridge, passed through the hamlet of Ferrone, where there were other depots for spare parts and armament small parts, then reached the hamlet of Gabbiano, where there was another small station, and crossed the Gabbiano bridge (also known at the time as the Sant'Angelo bridge). Further on it passed the settlement of Passo dei Pecorai, then reached the industrial settlement of Testi, which was connected to the line by some tracks; after passing Testi the line entered a long section in its own seat, which lapped the Vicchiomaggio hill and gave the tramway the appearance of a real railway line, as far as the Greti bridge. From Greti in a short time the tramway reached Greve in Chianti where, at today's Piazza Trento, was the most important station. The Greve station included the passenger building, a large track bundle, and a large depot for rolling stock and goods. Upon arriving in Greve, traveling personnel for overnight lodging turned to a lady in the village who rented rooms and with whom the operating company had an agreement.

==== Track for freight service ====
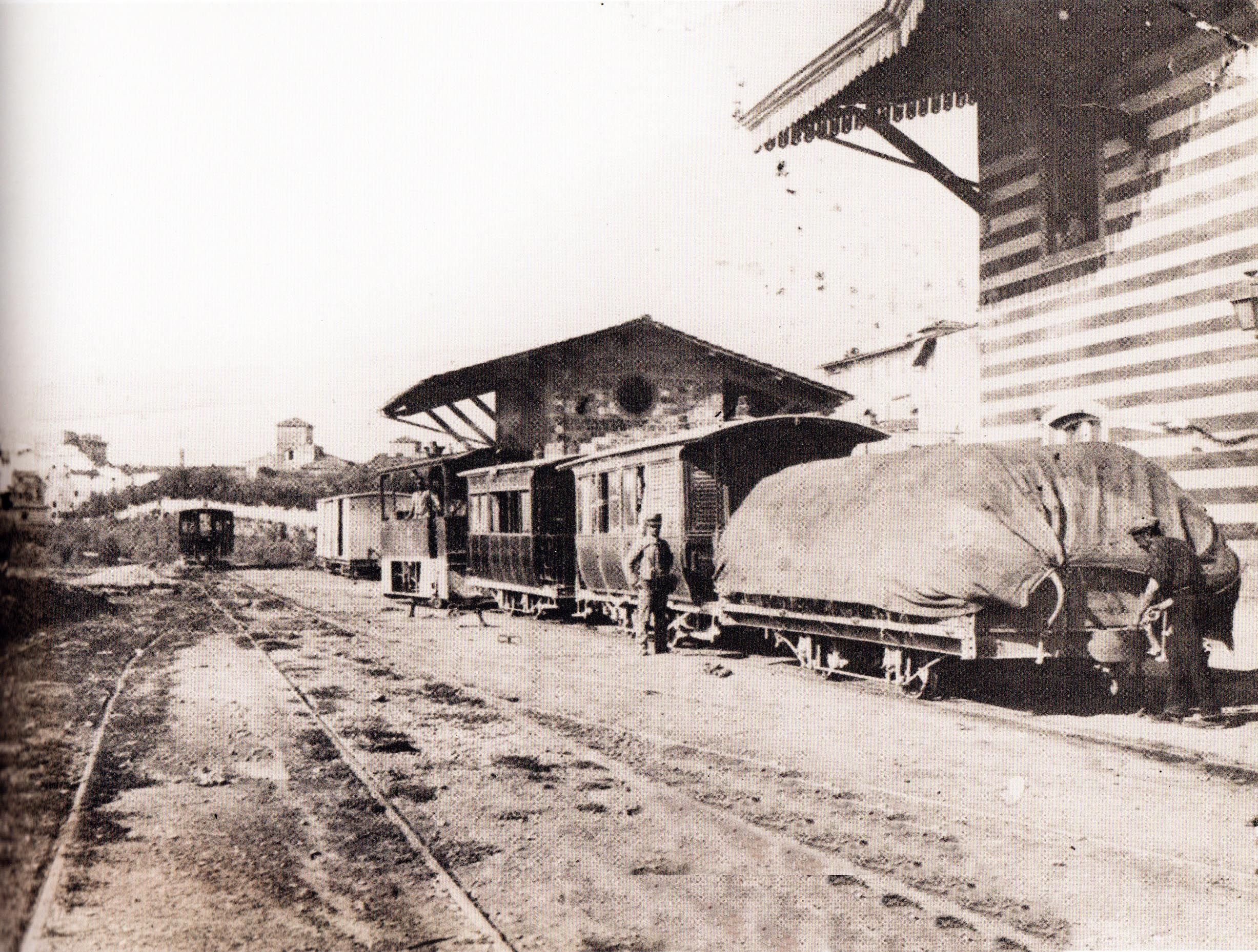
Mixed train stopping at the station of San Casciano in Val di Pesa (1914)

Freight service was carried out on the entire line.

When the track was built, it was intended to use the opportunity to connect, for freight use only, the Porta alla Croce tramway station with the Porta alla Croce railway station freight yard in use by the Strade Ferrate Romane and later by the Adriatic Network. However, the construction of these few meters of track sparked a very long dispute between the Florentine municipality and the concessionary company of the tramway: the approved project provided that from Piazza Beccaria the track would turn into Via Scialoia and once past the railway by means of an underpass would end in the Porta alla Croce railway yard. At the same time, however, the Roman Railways had decided to relocate the railway further upstream, to the Campo di Marte station area; thus the tramway operators asked the municipality if they could modify their plan and presented an outline one. The variant presented provided for the construction, in place of the railway underpass, of a temporary track that was to be implanted along Viale Principe Eugenio and that would turn right to reach the station being dismantled. The City of Florence did not understand the project and accused the operating company of wanting to save money to avoid building the underpass. A long dispute ensued that ended only on 17 July 1891, when the construction of the temporary arm was authorized. When the Campo di Marte station was opened, tram service had meanwhile been electrified and the tracks ran along Viale Principe Eugenio, Piazza Donatello, Via degli Artisti, the Piazzola overpass, Viale Militare (later Viale dei Mille) and Via del Pratellino.

Due to the junction of the tramway line with the Campo di Marte freight yard, junctions were built along the entire line for the use of factories in the area. A first junction was located at Gelsomino for the use of the "Fabbrica Meccanica di Botti" for which an application had been submitted to the municipality of Florence on 5 May 1891; another authorization was granted by the municipality to the "Stabilimento Vinicolo" in the same locality. Another junction was located in the locality of Molino del Diavolo for the use of the grey stone quarries of Poggio ai Grilli; quarries that were very active at the time, so much so that the tramway in addition to the stop for the inhabitants of the locality made another stop for the exclusive use of the workers of the quarry itself. (Note: The convention to build this siding was signed on 27 September 1904 between the operators of the quarry, Mr. Nencioni, Mr. Tarchi and Mr. Nidiaci, and the director of the tramway Mr. Ezio Rosi. In the same convention the managers committed themselves to using at least 450 wagons per year. Uleri (1999, p. 105, note 25).) For the Testi cement plant, the line carried out a considerable amount of freight movement, quantifiable at an average of 10 wagons per day, (Note: The convention to build this junction was signed on 8 August 1906 between the Testi Cement Factory and the Florentine Tramway Company and provided for the transport of about 6000 t of cement per year. In a new agreement signed on 3 February 1909, the quantity was increased to 16,000 t. Uleri (1999, p. 105, note 26).) but when the cement plant began to use trucks of its own for freight transport, the tramway suffered a major economic loss.

Other sidings were located at Bottai for the Siligardi kiln and at Greti, where service was also provided by whole wagons for use by the Caldini-Bandinelli distillery and the Caldini mill. A switch and a siding were built for the Ferrone terracotta kilns where a wagon could be left at a standstill for both the kilns and the mill existing there; in the same locality the operating company had entered into an agreement with Mr. Luigi Lombardini, manager of a grocery store with a bakery called "Bottega della Tranvia," in which a telephone was installed for the exclusive use of the personnel on duty and connected with Greve, San Casciano and Florence.

=== The trackage ===
The line's trackage was made with Vignoles steel rails weighing 24 kilograms per meter with 11 sleepers and 9 m rails and a gauge of 1445 mm. These rails were different from those stipulated in the contract (25 kg/m) but it was preferred to opt for the less heavy ones as they were more readily available on the market. To decrease frictional resistance, the curves were made with a minimum radius of 50 m, which sometimes required going off the roadway to run in its own track.

== Rolling stock ==
=== Traction material ===
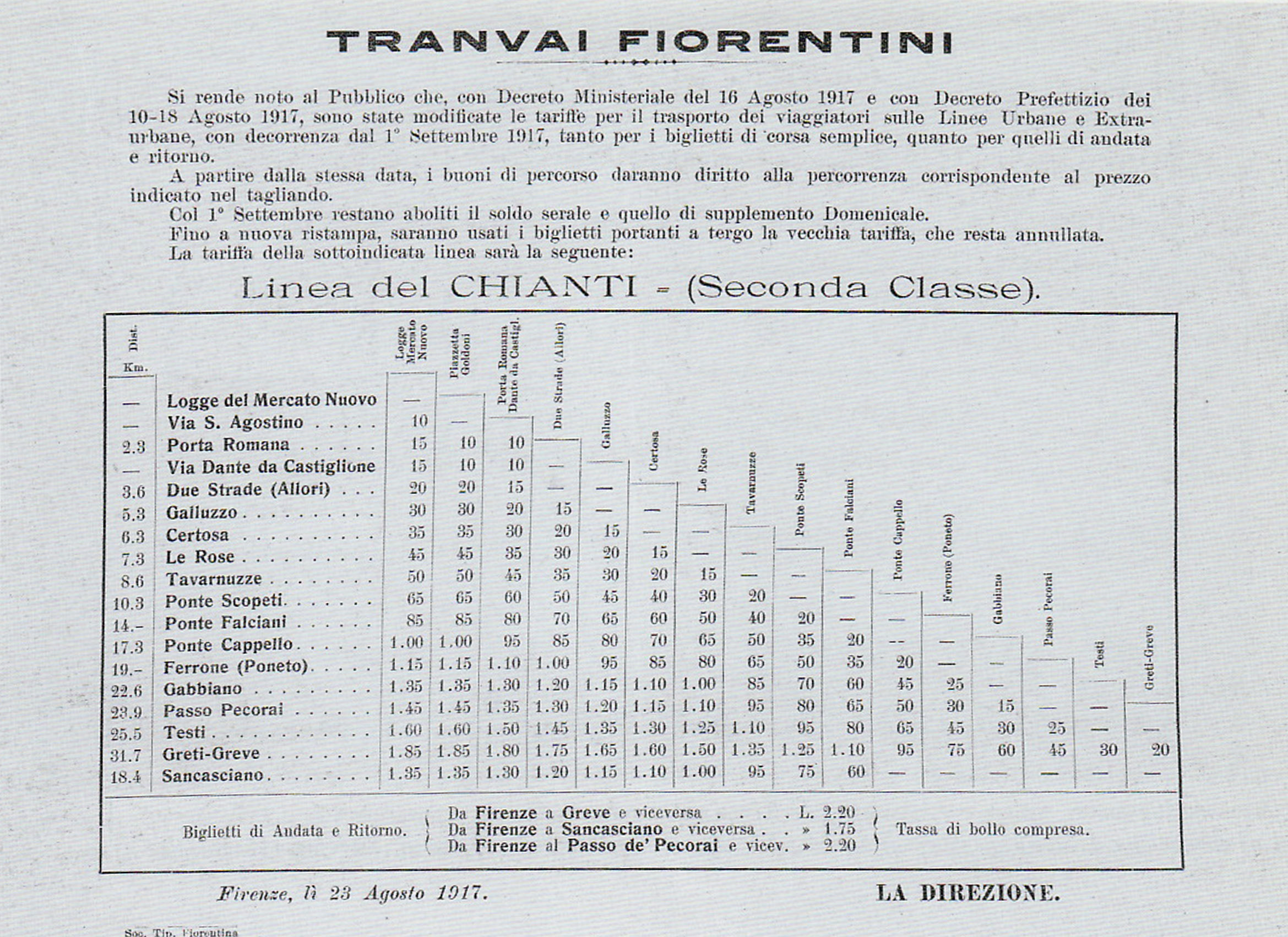
Rates of the 2nd class in effect in 1917

The branch line to San Casciano ran along a steeply sloping section and therefore the most powerful locomotives among those in use in the Florentine area were used on the Chianti line. The vehicles were built by the Krauss &C. Company of Munich, and three of them, named Pier Vettori, Passignano and Niccolò da Uzzano, dated back to 1889 and were three-axle with a power output of 89 kW (120 hp). Also dating from 1889 were six other locomotives still with three axles but with a power output of 74 kW (100 hp) and were named Acciaioli, Accursio, Buondelmonti, Giovanni da Verrazzano, Machiavelli and Greve (the latter built in 1893). Only one was two-axle: the Vittoria, built in 1888 had an output of only 44 kW (60 hp): This last locomotive was called "the Glorious" because it was the first to enter service and was also the locomotive that on 1 August 1935 pulled the last convoy from San Casciano to Florence. In spite of the bumpy route and, in the Falciani-San Casciano section also with considerable gradients, all the locomotives always performed well with the only fault of suffering a consistent decrease in speed.

The speed very seldom managed to reach 20 km/h, more often the maximum speed on the plain was 18 km/h but in the Ponte dei Falciani-San Casciano section it dropped to 12 km/h and in the section from the Barrier of San Niccolò to the whole Viale dei Colli it dropped to 7 km/h. With these speeds, the trainsets traveled the Florence-Greve in Chianti section in about 2 hours while up to San Casciano it took an average of 1 hour and 23 minutes.

After the Poggio a Caiano tramway was discontinued on the Chianti line, four more 44 kW Krauss locomotives, also from that line, were used; one of them, however, No. 22, first served for a few years on the Naples-Caivano tramway.

Service number	Name	Power	Axes	Wheelbase (mm)	Weight	Pulling force	Maximum speed (km/h)	Year of construction	Serial number
N. 1	Niccolò da Uzzano	120 CV	3	2000	18070	2700	30 km/h	1889	2208
N. 2	Passignano	120 CV	3	2000	18070	2700	30 km/h	1889	2207
N. 3	Pier Vettori	120 CV	3	2000	18070	2700	30 km/h	1889	2206
N. 4	Giovanni da Verrazzano	100 CV	3	2000	16100	2138	25 km/h	1889	2205
N. 5	Accursio	100 CV	3	2000	16100	2138	25 km/h	1889	2204
N. 6	Machiavelli	100 CV	3	2000	16100	2138	25 km/h	1889	2203
N. 7	Acciaioli	100 CV	3	2000	16100	2138	25 km/h	1889	2202
N. 8	Buondelmonti	100 CV	3	2000	16100	2138	25 km/h	1889	2201
N. 9	Vittoria	60 CV	2	1600	10775	1420	25 km/h	1888	1652
N. 10	Greve	100 CV	3	2000	16100	2138	25 km/h	1893	2893
N. 18		60 CV	2	1600	10775	1420	25 km/h	1883	
N. 20		60 CV	2	1600	10775	1420	25 km/h	1881	
N. 21		60 CV	2	1600	10775	1420	25 km/h	1883	
N. 22		60 CV	2	1600	10775	1420	20 km/h	1881	

=== Carriages and wagons ===
An average of 28 trips ran from Florence to Greve-San Casciano, while on the opposite section there were 24 trips but there were usually many additional trips that terminated at Tavarnuzze. There were fewer runs towards Florence because the convoys consisted of a larger number of carriages. In the direction of Greve, convoys generally consisted of six carriages while for San Casciano only three.

The cars were designed for 70 travelers and were built by Officine Grondona of Milan. They were two-axle with open terraces at the ends. Their weight was around 5 t. The different classes were easily distinguishable by the different color of the coaches: first class was red, second class was green, and the mixed class was two-tone. First-class carriages were heated through the use of zinc containers, filled with hot water taken from the locomotive, placed under the feet of travelers.

Freight cars were of the open or closed type and had four wheels on two axles and weighed about 6 tons.

=== Personnel ===
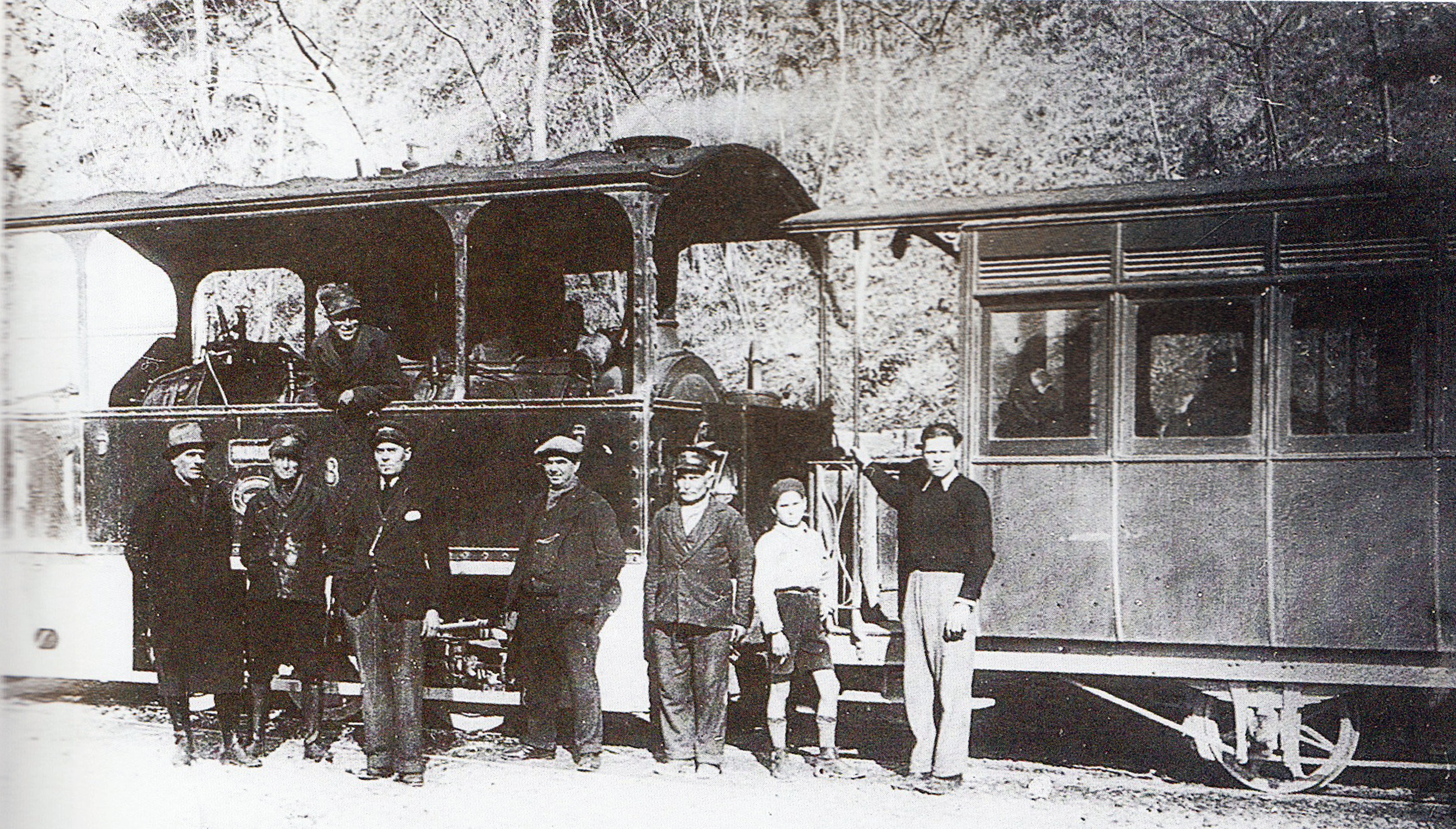
Streetcar personnel with locomotive No. 8 "Buondelmonti"

Title	Salary in liras as of 1 January 1919
Chief controllers	19,24
Machinists	19,22
Controllers	17,83
Licensed stokers	17,68
Train drivers	16,29
Unlicensed stokers	15,88
Brakemen	15,12
Bellhops	15,01
Roadmen	14,52

Strict rules were imposed on the personnel serving on the tramway, both in terms of uniforms, which had to be impeccable at all times, and behavior, which had to be proper and decent at all times. Salaries for those times were quite high, and the difference in pay between jobs was no more than 25 percent. Until 1 January 1919, those earning the most were the machinists followed by the chief controllers; from that date onward the chief controllers exceeded the machinists by two cents of a lira.

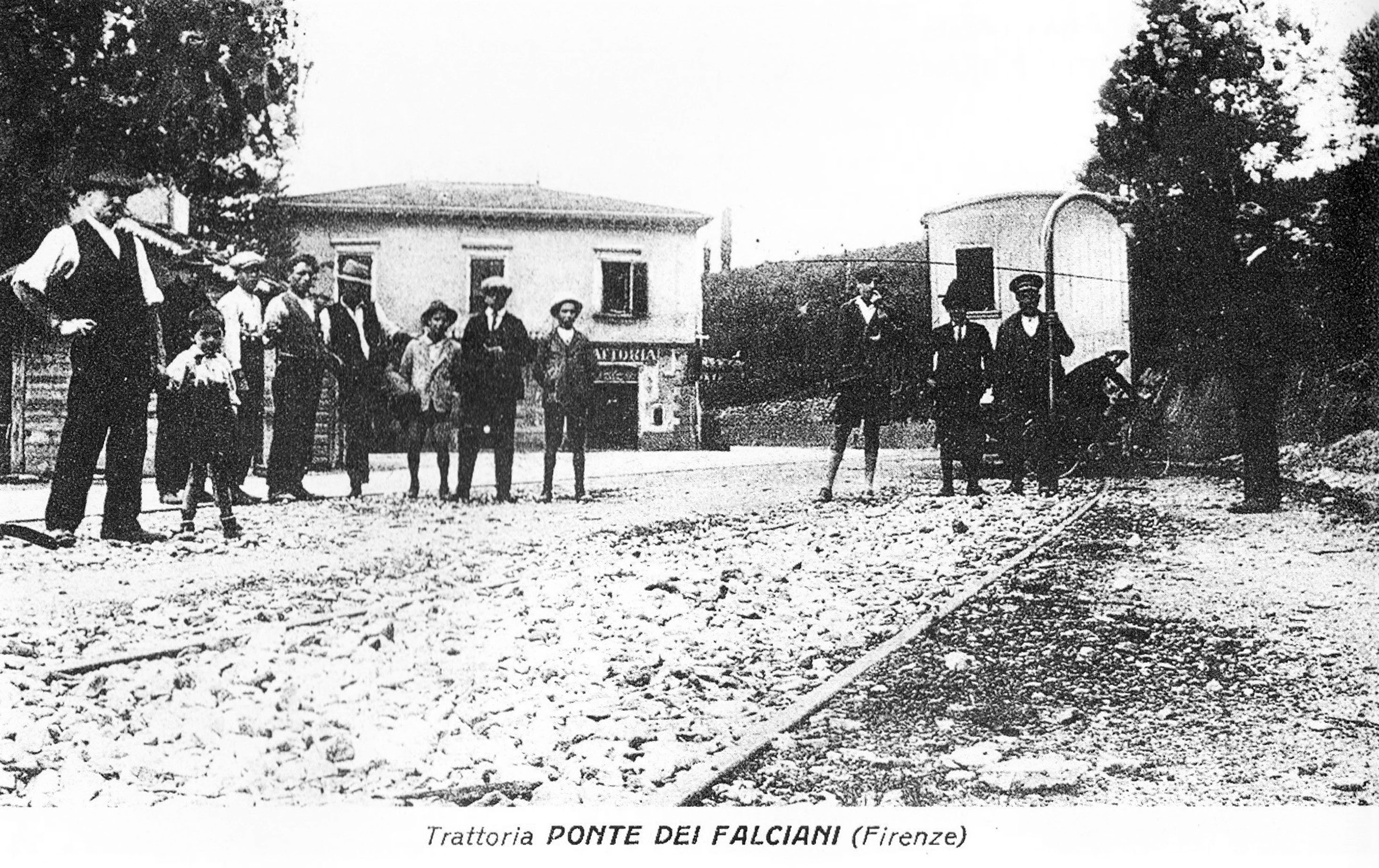
Tramway personnel posing in front of the Falciani station (the gentleman leaning against the water filler is Furbino)

Among the various functions is that of the licensed stokers, who were generally the engineer's helpers but in case of need were qualified to drive the locomotive. Unskilled stokers, in addition to their duties, were obliged to know how to make use of the brake and brake call and hazard signals. The convoys on the Florentine lines never had continuous braking so the task of braking fell to the engineer along with the various brakemen arranged one per vehicle with the job of bellhop-brakeman. On the last car of each convoy was the conductor.

The personnel became the protagonists of numerous episodes that have remained in memory, first among them the behavior of engineer Testi during the accident in 1907. However, lighter memories also remained. One of the most peculiar characters was the auxiliary agent who performed his service at the Gelsomino station; he was a man of mild and good-natured character and, perhaps because of this, he was given the nickname Furbino and was often the object of jokes; it is said that he had the habit of lighting fires to warm himself and this was an operation not allowed by the regulations, but known by his colleagues who one day called him on the phone, a novelty of the time, and said, "What are you doing! Are you setting fire to everything? The smoke goes all the way up here!" The mild-mannered Furbino became frightened and thought the smoke was being transmitted over the telephone and immediately went to put out the fire and never lit it again.

The personnel of the Chianti tramway, but also of the other tramway lines, expressed the caustic Florentine style so well that they were renamed those of the tramway. Among their exploits, which have remained in the memory of service workers, are:

- the bellboy who, when it got dark, pretended to hang himself with the strap of his bag, arousing the fright of travelers;
- another demanded the intervention of a police officer or carabiniere, if present on board the car, to "stop that heat wave."
- the driver known as the Flying Madman, who traveled down the Poggio Imperiale descent at seven notches, or full speed, and regularly derailed in the Porta Romana square.

== The tramway in literature ==
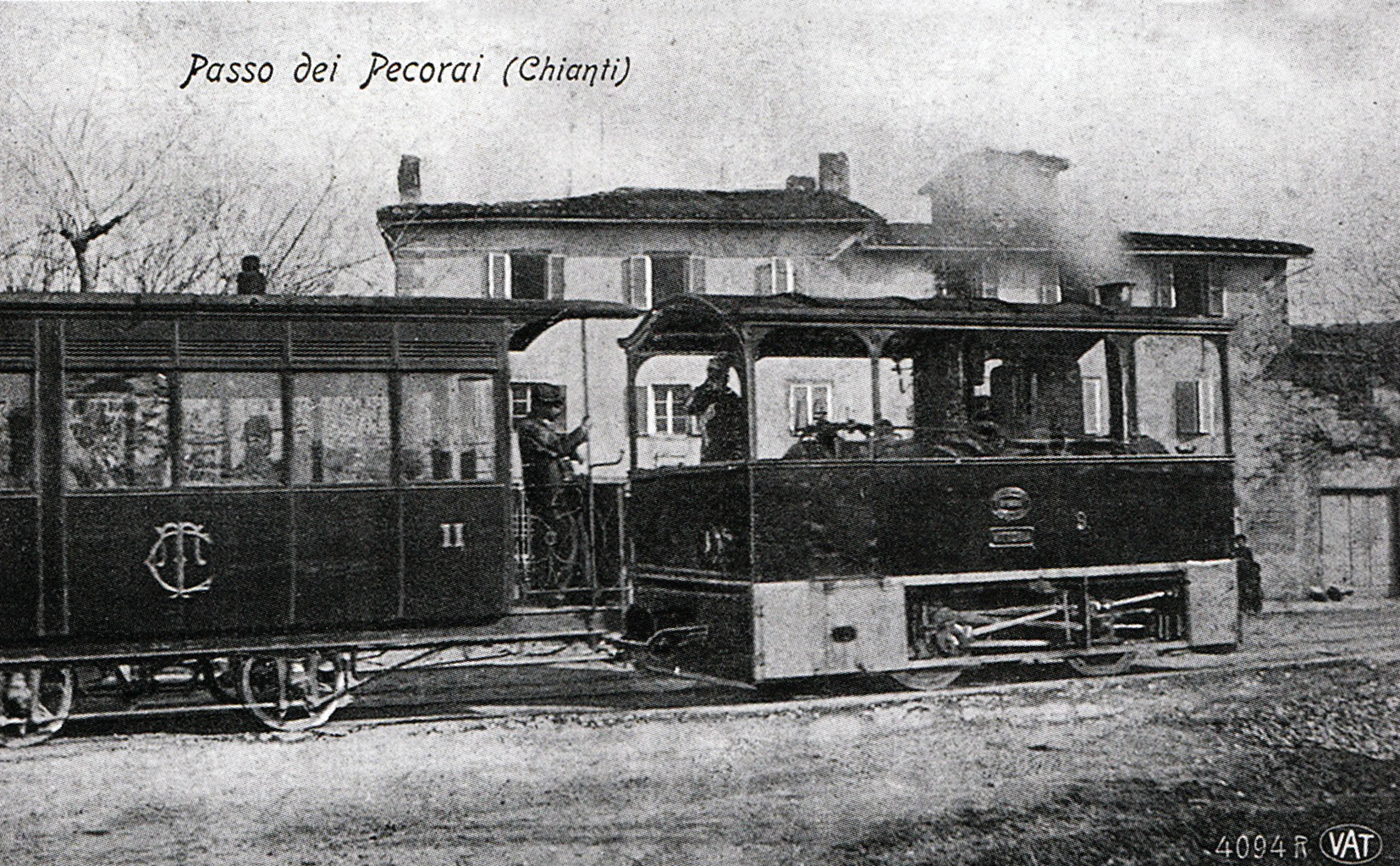
Convoy led by locomotive No. 9 "Vittoria" in transit near the Pecorai Pass

Evidence of the tramway also remains in the literature of the time due to the presence in Greve in Chianti of two prominent figures: Domenico Giuliotti and Bino Sanminiatelli. Domenico Giuliotti resided in the very village of Greve, and to visit him, numerous of his friends used and described the tramway; among them are Giovanni Papini, Nicola Lisi, Bruno Cicognani, Ferdinando Paolieri, Ardengo Soffici and Raffaello Romanelli. Giovanni Papini was the friend who most frequented Giuliotti and described the Chianti tramway in a few pages of "Gli operai della vigna" in 1929 where he recounted his first trip on the little train; Papini's daughter Viola Paszkowski also described the little train in her 1956 book entitled La bambina guardava. Nicola Lisi spoke of the streetcar in the 1935 Ragguaglio dell'attività letteraria dei cattolici when he described his trip on the little train to visit Giuliotti in his house referred to as the cave of the wild man.

Ferdinando Paolieri spoke of the tramway in his Novelle toscane of 1914 in the short story Il fico, a story that opens with a description of the San Casciano station. Among the San Casciano writers who spoke of the tramway was Pasquale Bellini, who in his Un uomo si confessa (1962) recalled his youth and spoke of life at the San Casciano station, and also Don Tebaldo Pellizzari, a presbyter who was a friend of Giuliotti and Papini and a contributor to the magazine Il Frontespizio.

The most accurate description of the Chianti tramway belonged to Domenico Giuliotti, who on the occasion of the abolition of the service in 1935 wrote in La Nazione a sentimental-grotesque eulogy entitled Panegirico di mangiacarbone, which was followed in 1937 by a second story entitled Ma non era morto published in the work Racconti rossi e neri, published by Vallecchi.

== See also ==
- Trams in Florence
- List of town tramway systems in Italy
- Greve in Chianti
- San Casciano in Val di Pesa

== Bibliography ==
=== Books ===
- Società Anonima "Les Tramways Florentins", Regolamento di servizio. Firenze: Stabilimento Pellas. 1886.
- Poggi, Giuseppe (1888). Sul progetto di tramvia del Chianti pel Viale dei Colli. Firenze: Barbera.
- Raddi, Amerigo (1896). Il servizio del tramvia di Firenze e il suo ordinamento. Firenze: Tipografia Campolmi.
- Ogliari, Francesco; Sapi, Franco (1971). Storia dei trasporti italiani - Segmenti di lavoro. Volume XI, XII, XIII. Milano: Cavallotti.
- Cefaratti, Nicola; Malaspina, Moroello (1987). 1865-1985 Centoventi anni di trasporti pubblici a Firenze. Cortona: Calosci editore.
- Conti, Fulvio; Corradi, Gianluca (1996). Cavalli e motori: oltre cento anni di trasporto pubblico a Firenze nelle immagini Alinari. Firenze: edizioni Alinari.
- Uleri, Angelo (1999). Le tranvie a vapore della Toscana. Alinea editrice.
- Baldini, Carlo; Calamandrei, Angiolo (2003). Col trenino del Chianti da Firenze a Greve in Chianti e San Casciano Val di Pesa 1889-1935. Greve in Chianti: edito a cura del comune di Greve in Chianti.
- Pampaloni, Otello (2003). Il Trenino del Chianti. San Casciano in Val di Pesa: edito a cura del gruppo culturale "La Porticciola".
- Pettinelli, Fabrizio (2008). Firenze in tranvai. Breve cronistoria del trasporto pubblico. Firenze: AIDA editore.

=== Newspapers and magazines ===
- "Il Chianti", years 1890-1937.
- La Nazione, years 1887-1935.
