= Porta Romana, Florence =

City gate in Florence, Italy

Coordinates: 43°45′38.44″N 11°14′30.80″E

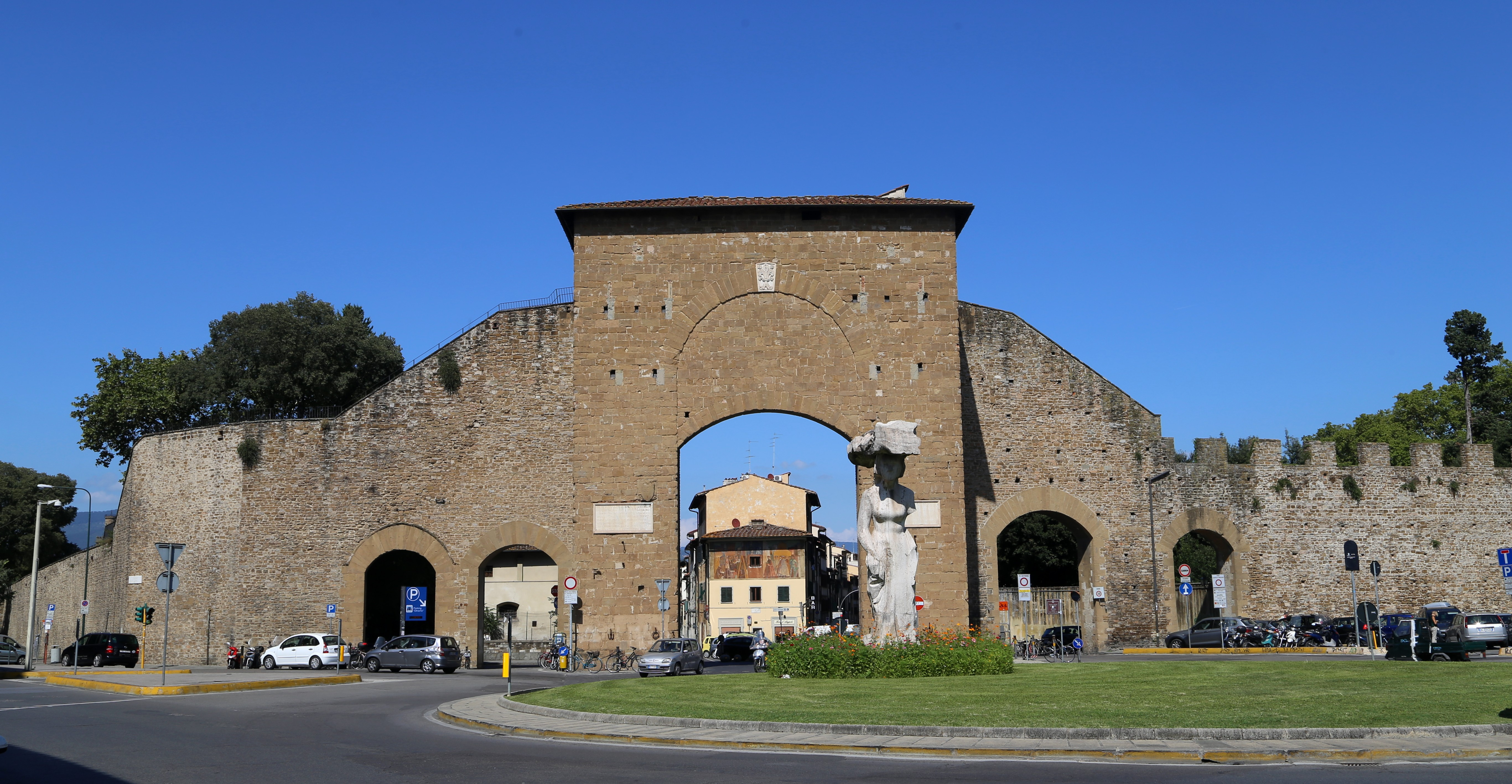
View of the gate from the inner (city) side, note the modern statue in the street circle in front.

The Porta Romana, once known as the Porta San Pier Gattolino was the southernmost gate in the 13th-century walls of the Oltrarno section of Florence, region of Tuscany, Italy. It stands at the confluence of a number of roads: accessed from north by Via Romana, Via de' Serragli, and Viale Francesco Petrarca. In addition, a central road along the Boboli Gardens begins near the gate, and allowed the inhabitants of the Pitti Palace to exit and enter Florence with minimal travel on city streets. Beyond the gates are the Via del Poggio Imperiale and Via Senese. The latter led to Siena and points south such as Rome, hence the name. When the majority of the defensive walls of Florence were razed in the 19th century, only a few, and sometimes partial gate structures were left standing including San Gallo Gate, Tower of San Niccolò, and this gate with a snippet of merlonated wall.

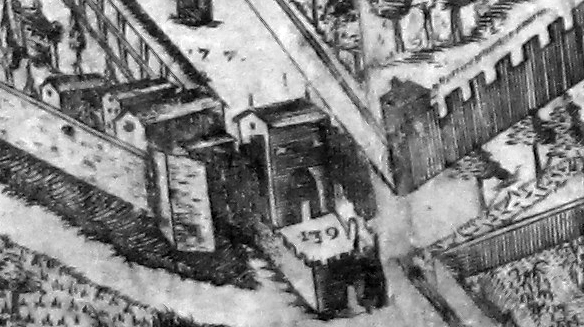
Detail of Buosignori map (1584)

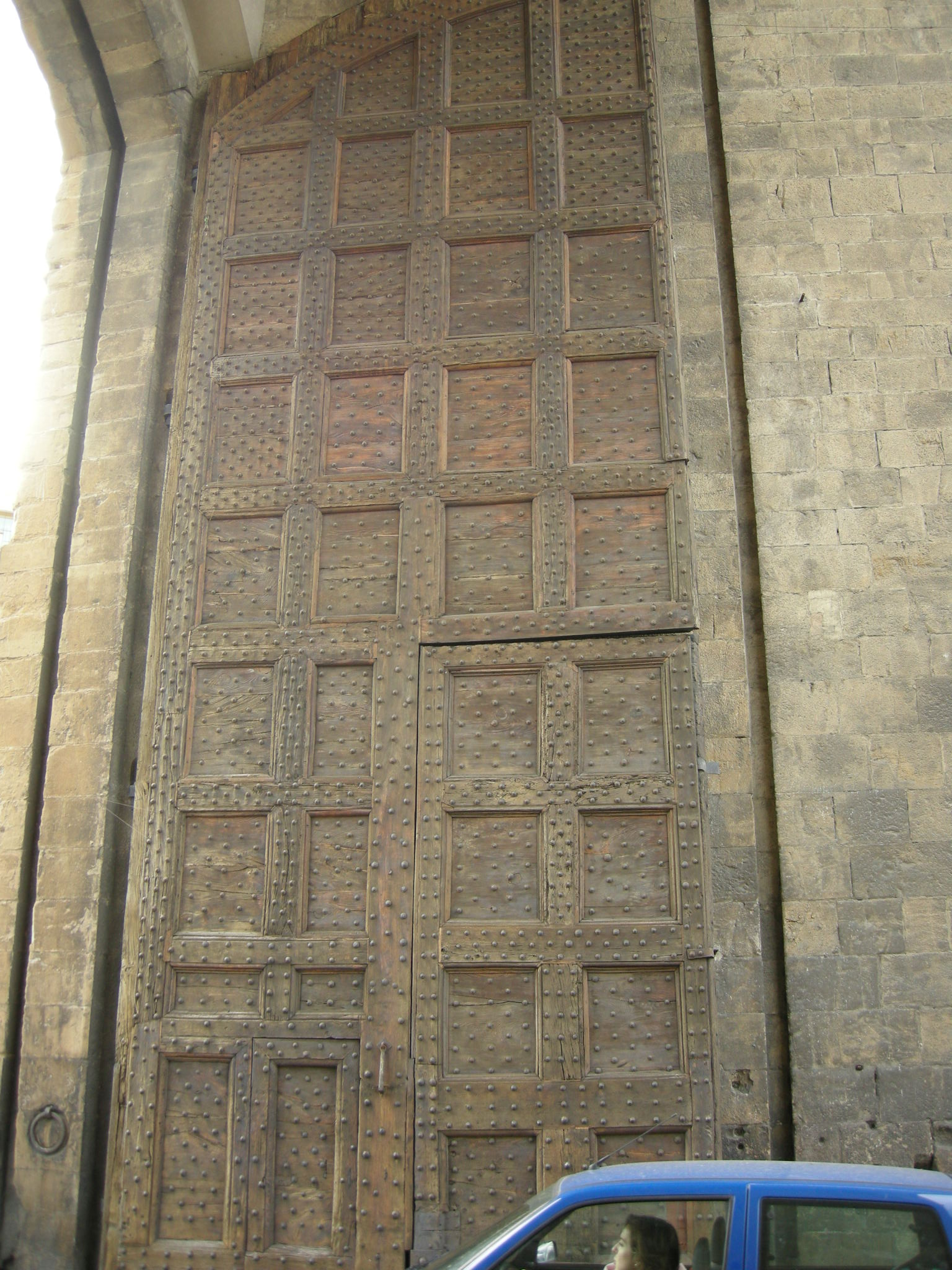
Iron clad doors.

The 13th century walls and gates of the city were erected with the designs of various builders; among the main contributors were Arnolfo di Cambio, with contributions by Orcagna, Giotto and others. A plaque on the external wall claims the gate was erected in 1327. Originally and as demonstrated on the 1584 Map by Stefano Buonsignori the gate had a lower outer wall with a small courtyard dominated by the larger gate we see today; in this, the gate resembled the Porta Romana of Siena. The gate had a large central entrance for horse-drawn carriages, and smaller lateral doors for pedestrian entry. The door retains its original massive, iron-clad doors. The outer arch has a weather-worn 13th-century fresco, depicting the enthroned Virgin and saints.

The interior portion of the gate has two marble plaques: one commemorates the 1515 entrance into Florence of the Medici Pope Leo X, and the other the 1535 entry of Charles V, Holy Roman Emperor.

When Cosimo I augmented the walls around Florence, at this site, he destroyed the church of San Pier Gattolino that had stood at the site since at least 1068. A subsequent church was rebuilt, which was restored in 1808, when frescoes of Giuseppe Castagnoli and Domenico Del Podestà were added. The church was decorated by Giusto Mariani and Romanelli. It is said the term Gattolino is a corruption of Gattuario, others say it was a corruption of Catelina. Others attribute it to the Italian word "gattice", designating a type of white poplar. The church is also called the parish church of Serumido, derived from the name of Ser Umido di Domenico Grazzini, who helped to fund its rebuilding.

Just outside the wall was the 14th-century church and convent of San Giusto della Calza of the Knights of Jerusalem.

A controversial modern marble statue of two women, named "Dietro-Front" ("Turnabout"), was erected in the circle before the wall by the artist Michelangelo Pistoletto.
