= Ghelli =

Ghelli is an Italian surname. Notable people with the surname include:

- Raimondo Ghelli, 18th-century Italian painter and engraver
- Giuliano Ghelli (1944–2014), Italian painter
- Roberto Ghelli (born 1942), Italian footballer
