= Lucignano (disambiguation) =

Lucignano may refer to:

- Lucignano, a municipality in the province of Arezzo, Italy
- Lucignano, Montespertoli, a village in the metropolitan city of Florence, Italy
- Lucignano d'Arbia, a village in the province of Siena, Italy
- Lucignano d'Asso, a village in the province of Siena, Italy
- Lucignano in Chianti, a village in the province of Siena, Italy
