= Mercatale =

Mercatale may refer to:

- Mercatale, an Italian village situated in the municipality of Vinci
- Mercatale di Vernio, an Italian village situated in the municipality of Vernio
- Mercatale in Val di Pesa, an Italian village situated in the municipality of San Casciano in Val di Pesa
