= Sidney Sonnino Castle =

- Castello di Sidney Sonnino
- Montespertoli, Tuscany, Italy
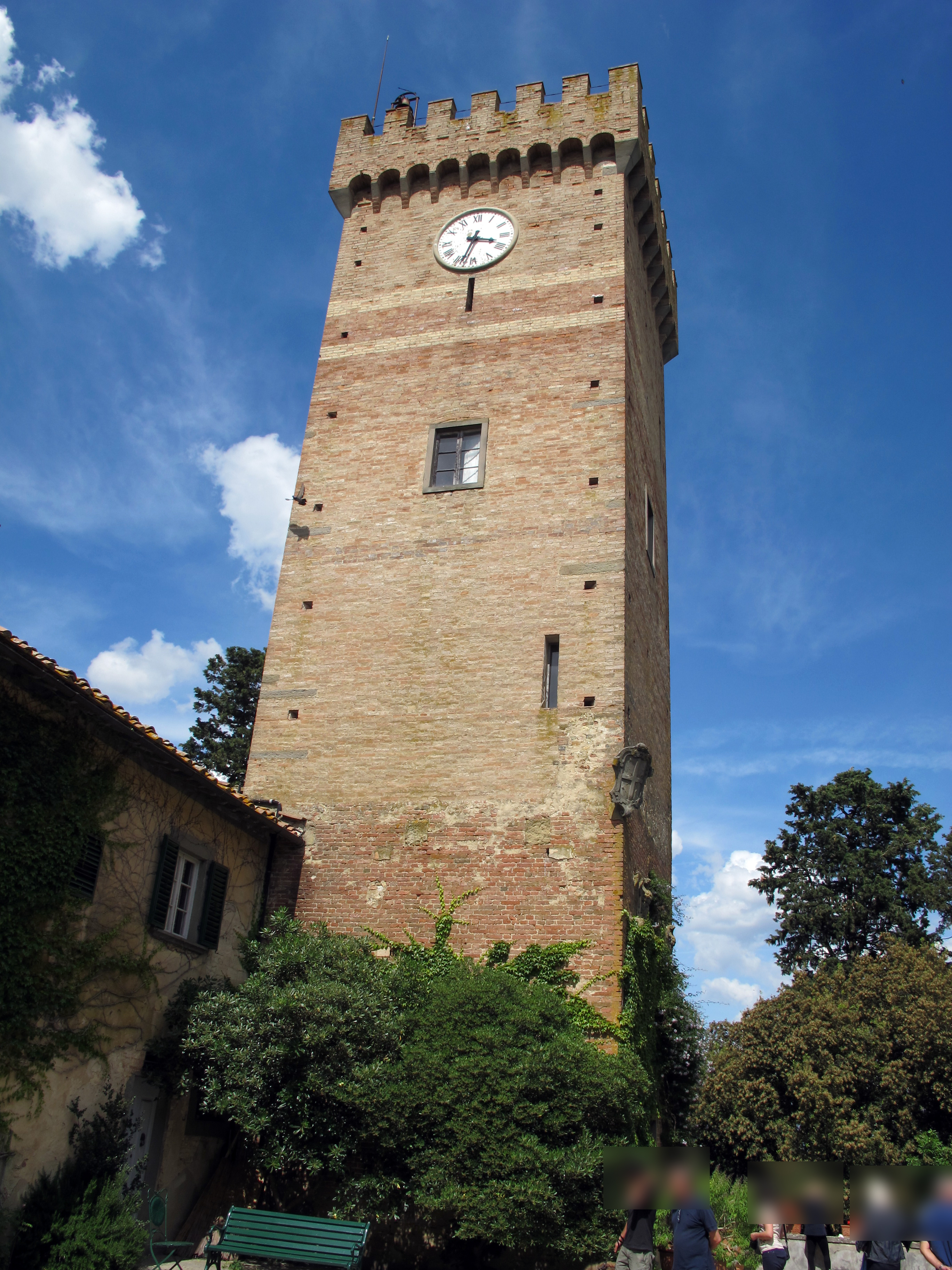
- Sidney Sonnino Castle

Site information
- Type: Castle

Location
- Location in Italy
- Coordinates: 43°38′45.38″N 11°04′53.13″E

Sidney Sonnino Castle (Italian: Castello di Sidney Sonnino) is a castle located in Montespertoli, a comune in the Metropolitan City of Florence in the Italian region Tuscany, located about 20 kilometres (12 mi) southwest of Florence. Montegufoni stands on the ancient Via Volterrana, the road taken by Charlemagne and other emperors to reach Florence or Rome and which passes through Volterra and Siena.

== History ==
The castle, formerly called "Montespertoli", is of medieval origin. It belonged to the Ghibelline Alberti Counts, Lords of the area, until they became extinct in 1393. It later passed to the Machiavelli family, who already owned a number of estates in the area, and from 1830 it belonged to the Sonnino family. The period in which it was inhabited by Baron Sidney Sonnino was especially famous, hosting numerous personalities of the time: Francesco Crispi, Giovanni Giolitti, Gabriele D'Annunzio, and Kings Umberto I, and Victor Emmanuel III. During that period, important agricultural reforms and innovations were implemented.

Numerous works of art come from the castle and are now in the museums and churches of the area, including Madonna and Child by Filippo Lippi, today in the local Museum of Sacred Art (Italian: Museo di arte sacra), as well as a wooden crucifix by Taddeo Gaddi, today in the Church of San Lorenzo in Montegufoni (Italian: Chiesa di San Lorenzo a Montegufoni).

Today the castle preserves, in addition to various relics, the archive with all of Sonnino's correspondence and documents regarding the preliminaries and the progress of Italy's entry into the war in 1915, as well as those relating to the Congresses of Paris and Versailles of 1916 and 1918, respectively.

== Gallery ==
=== Castle ===
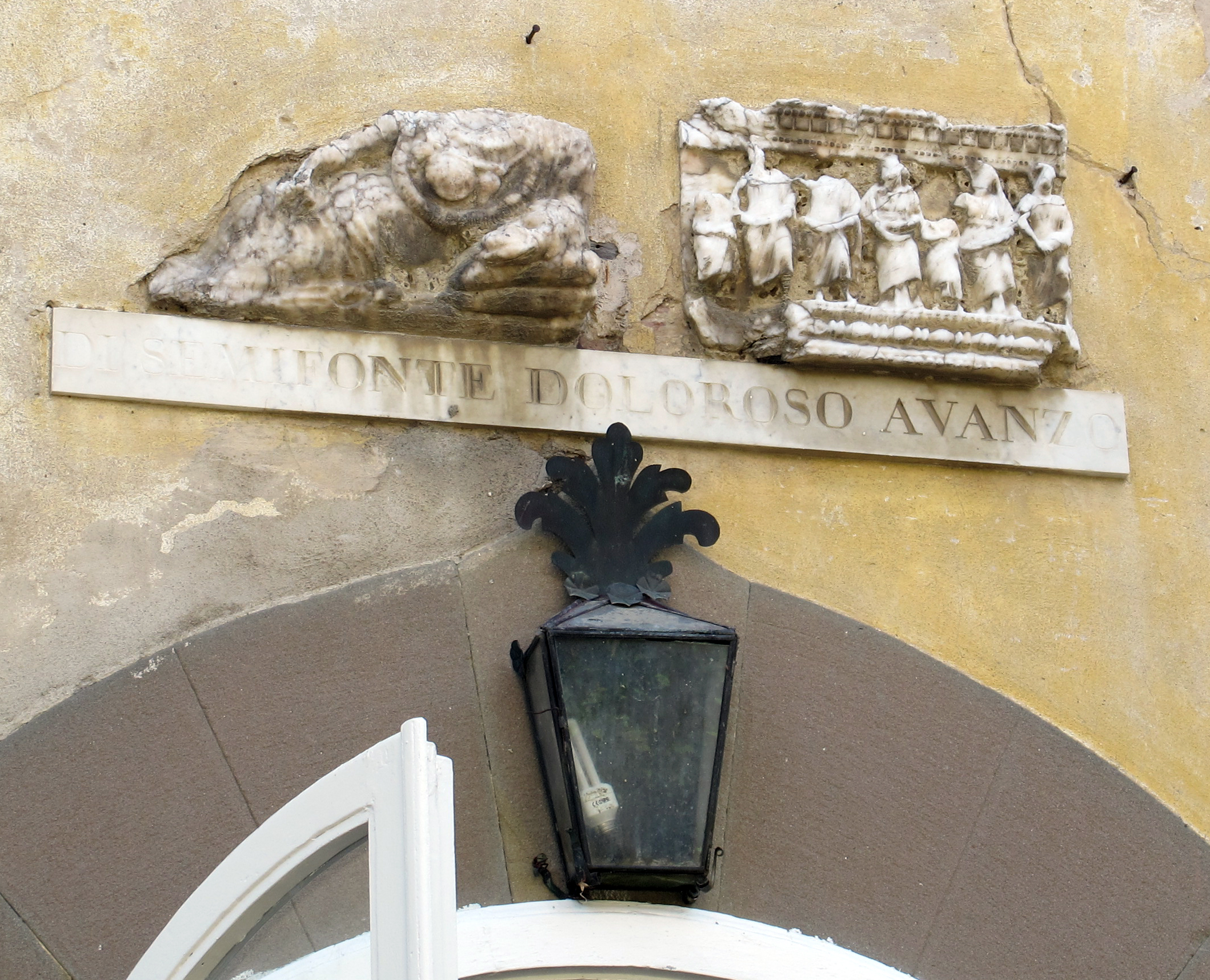

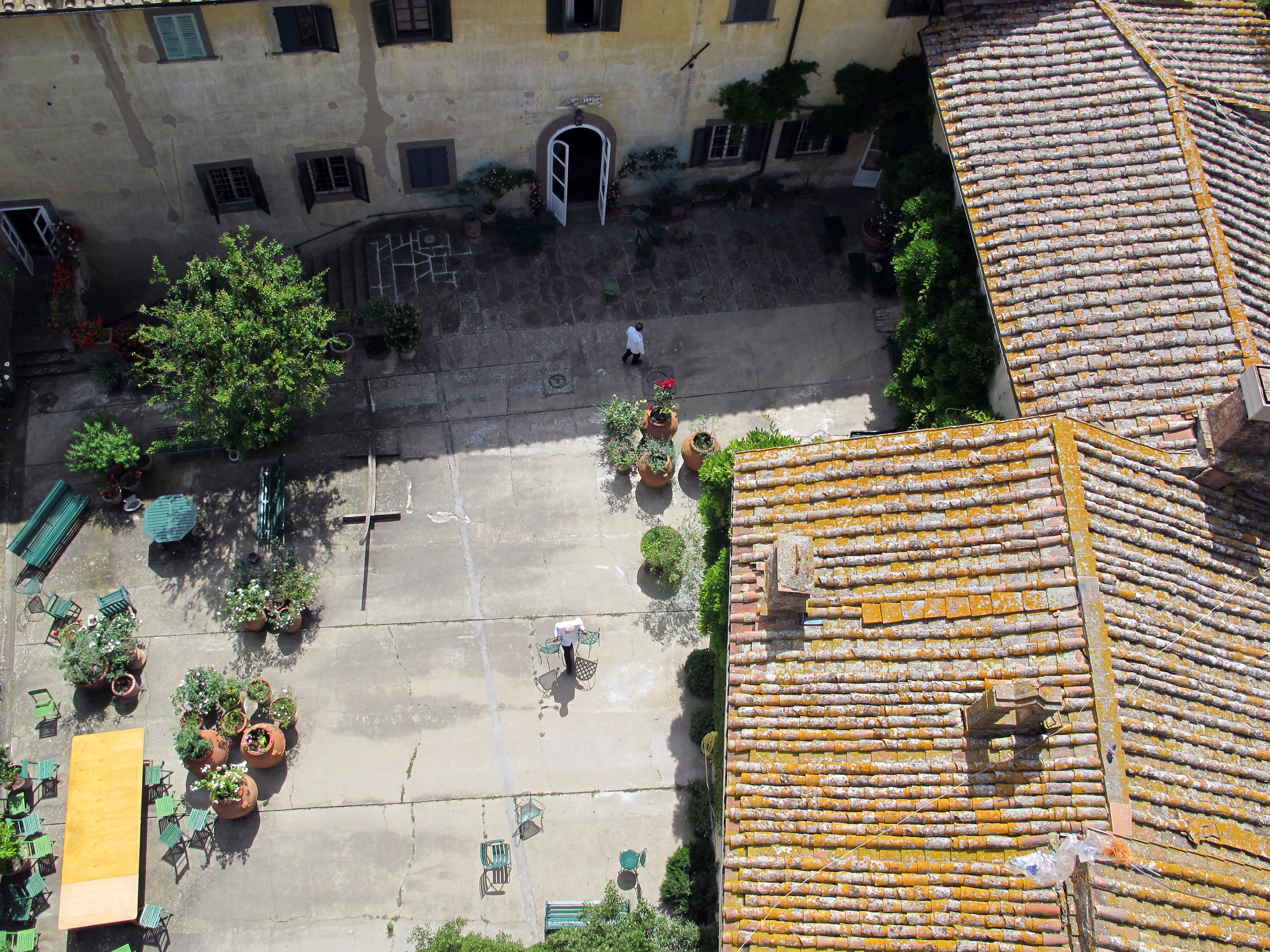

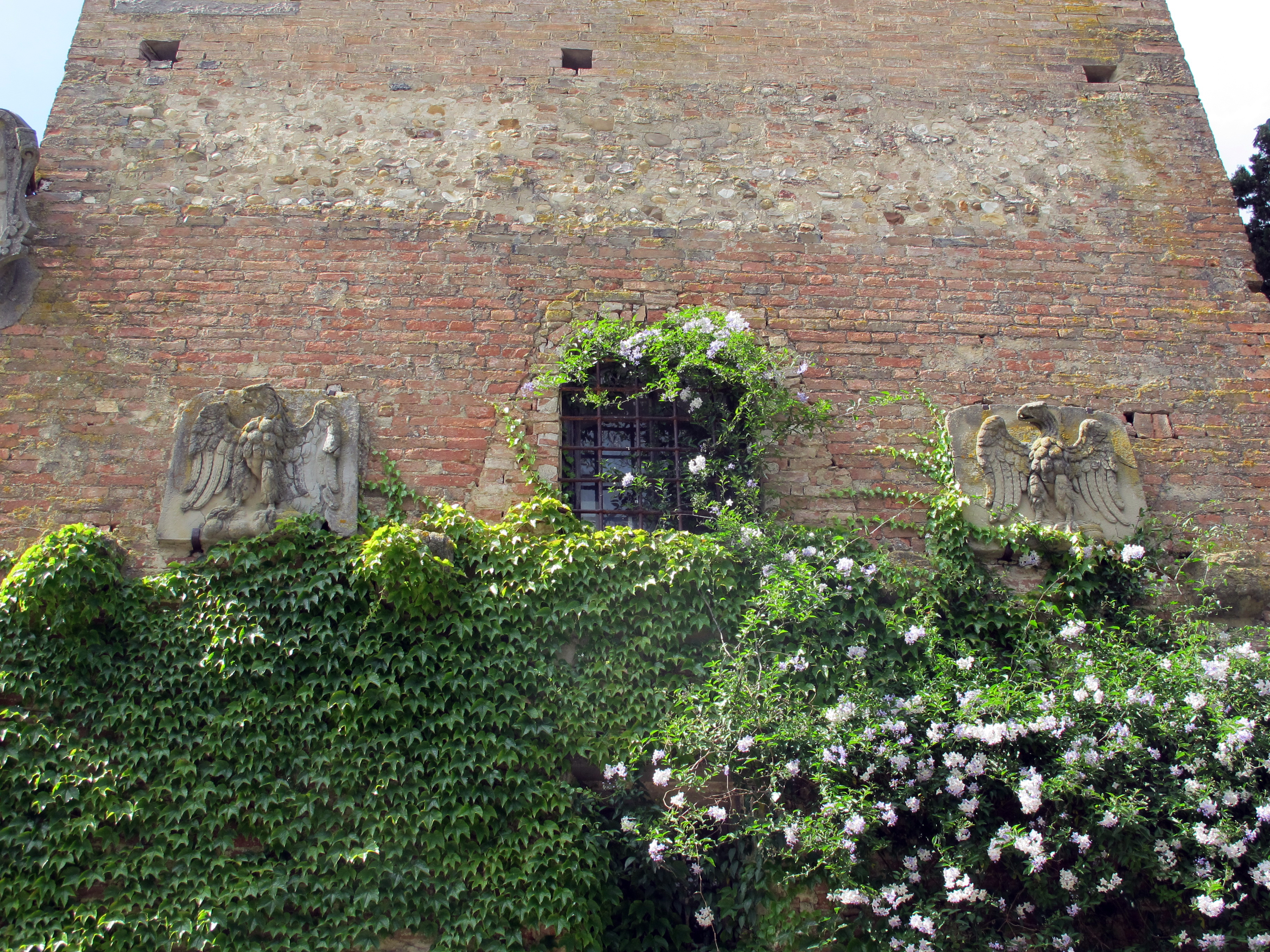

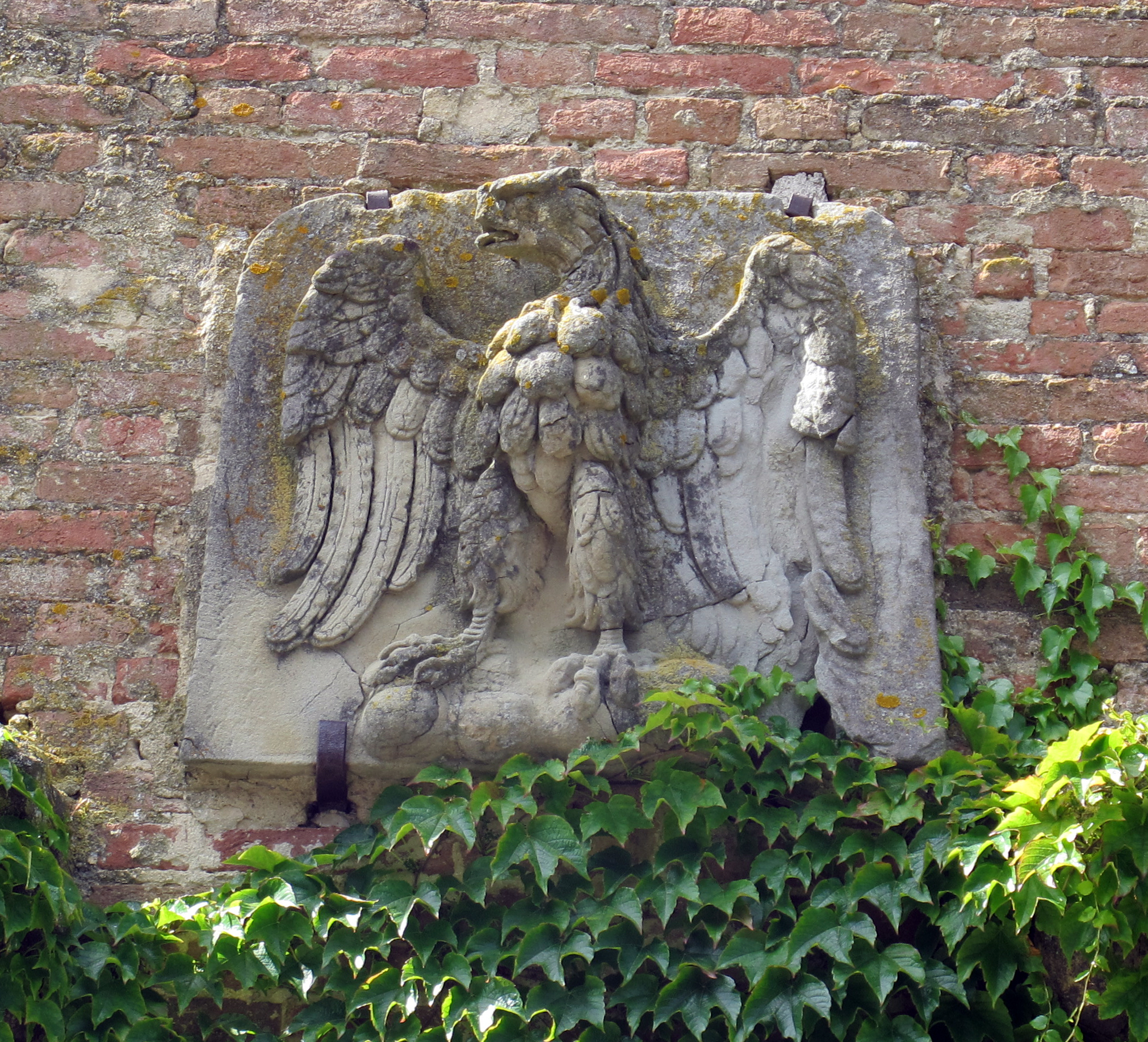

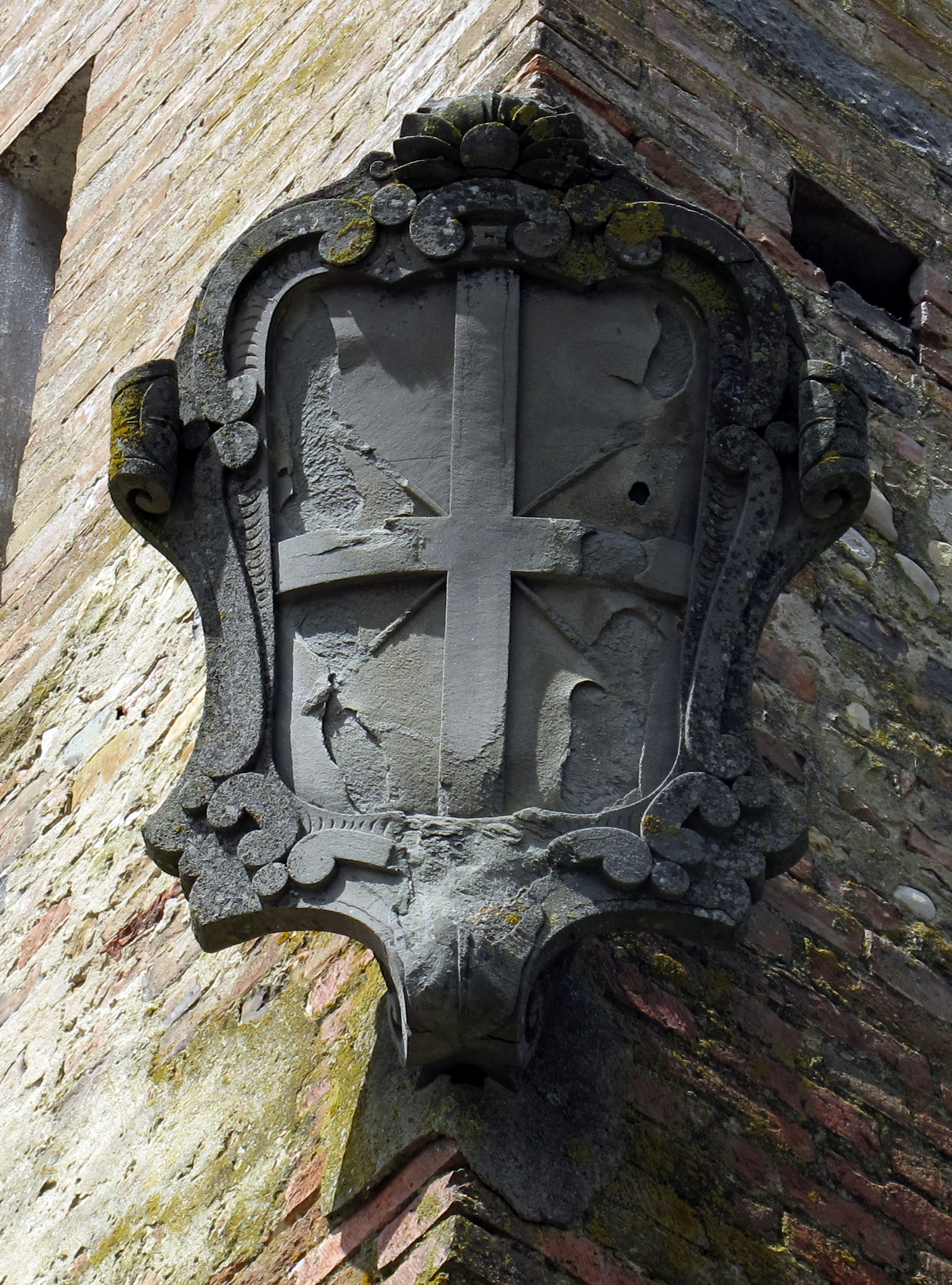

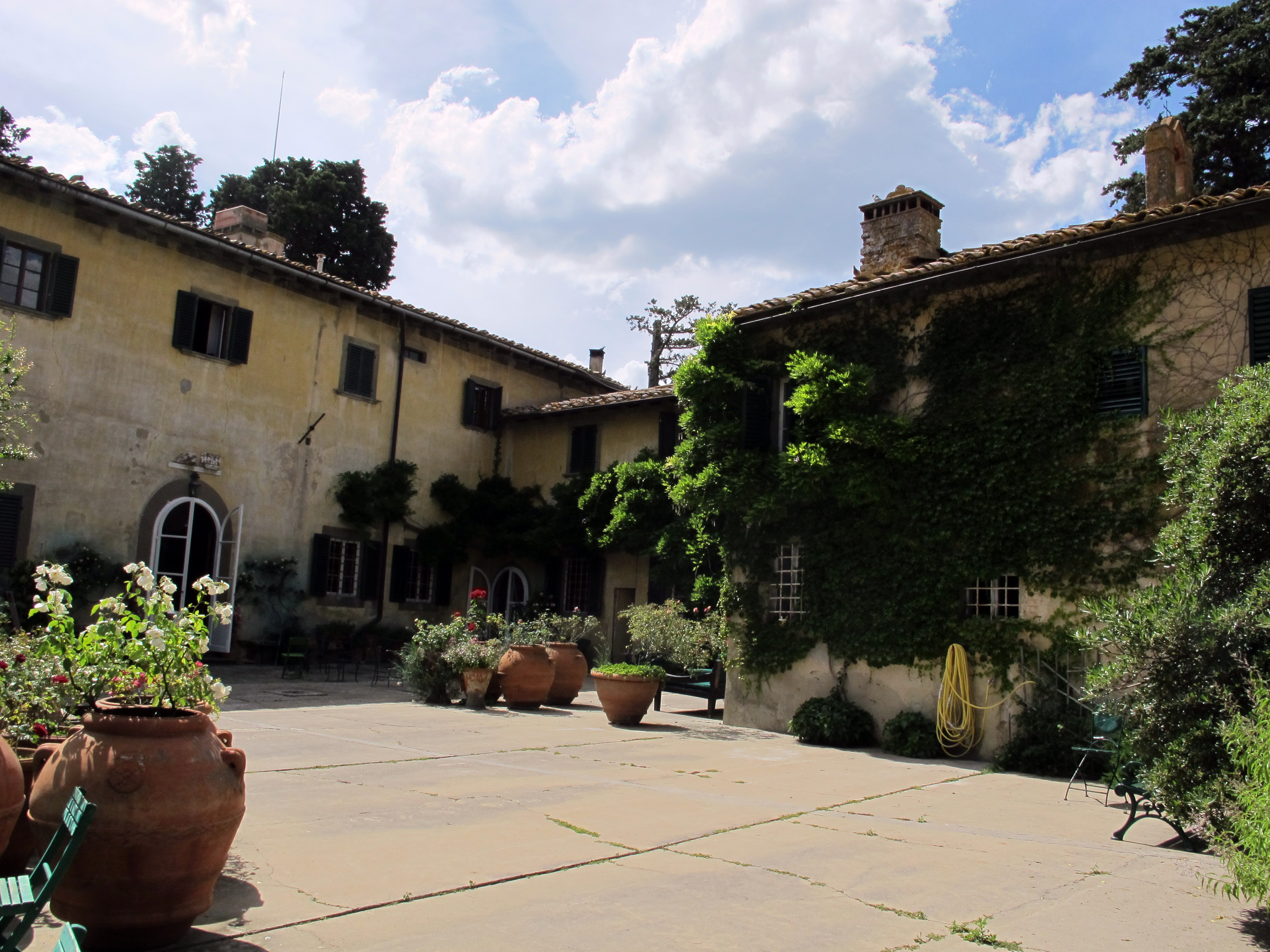

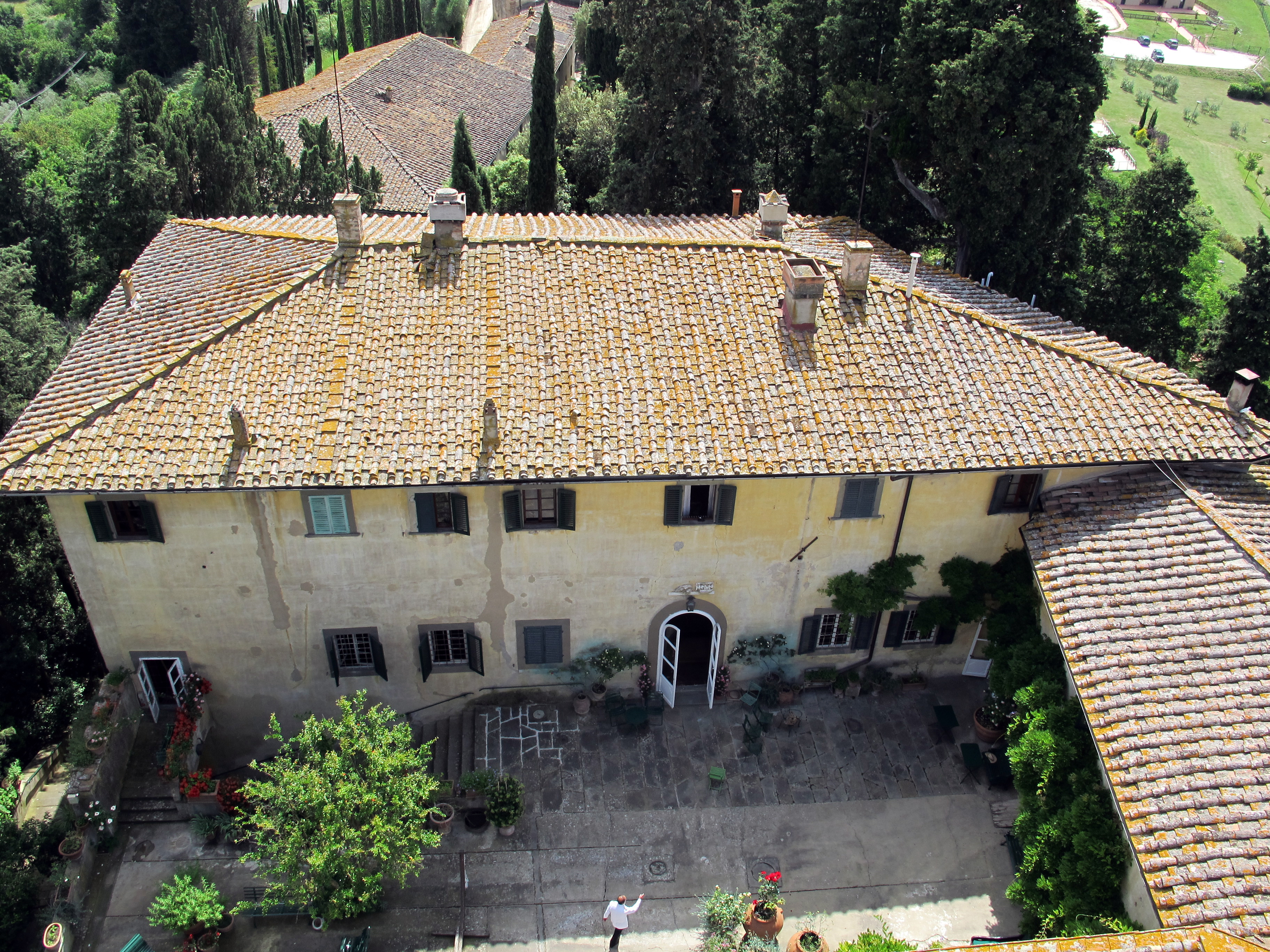

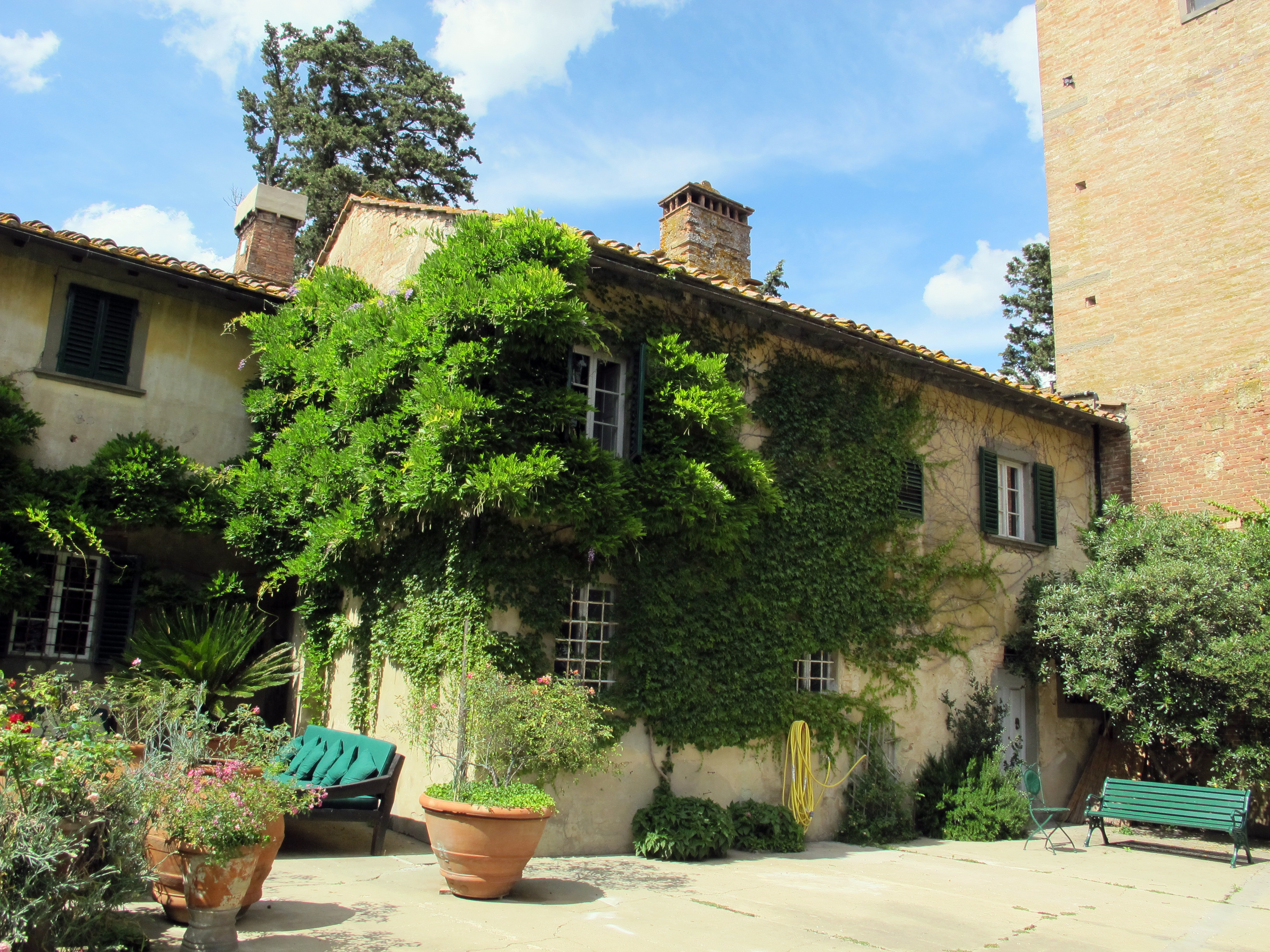

=== Winery ===
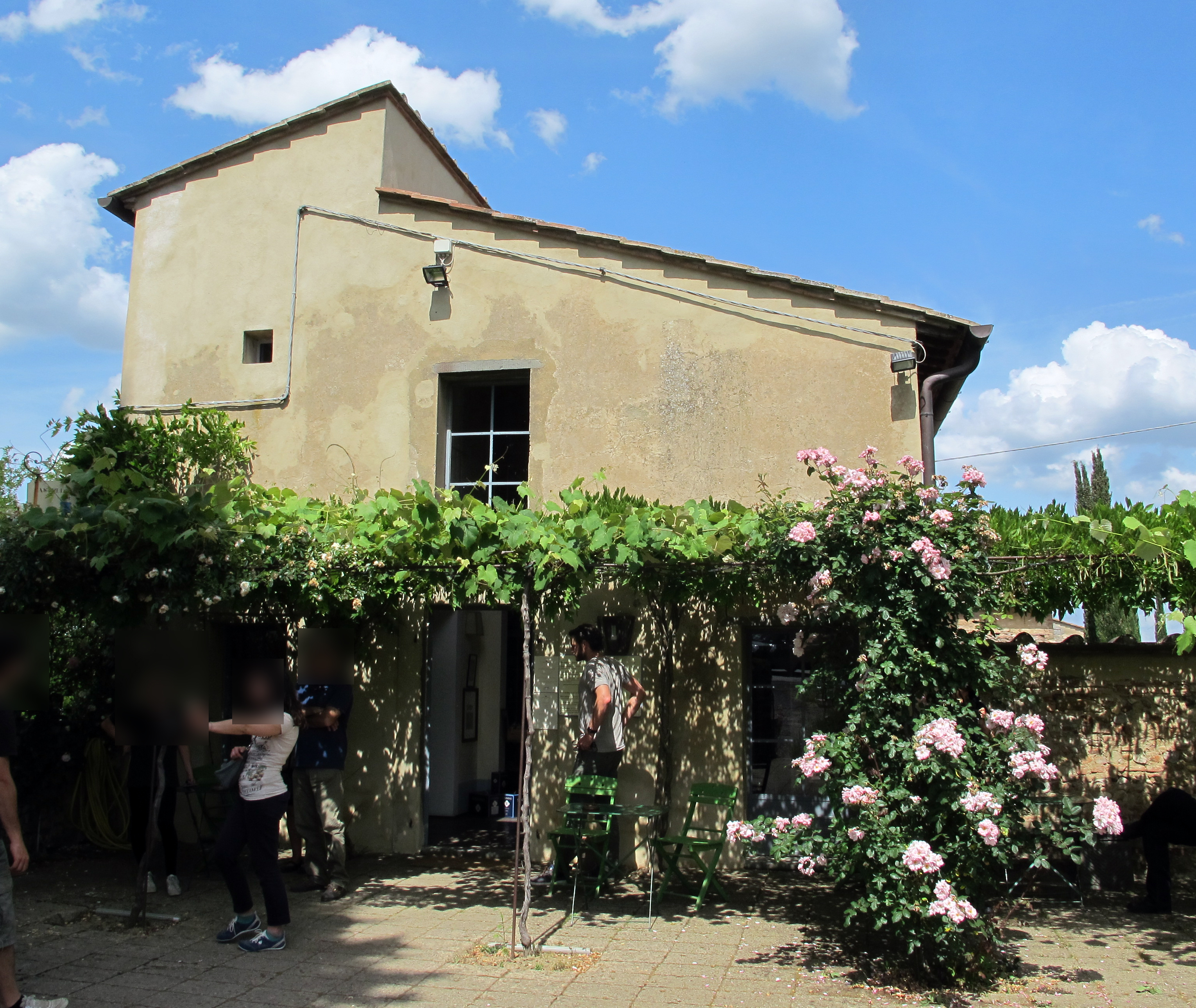

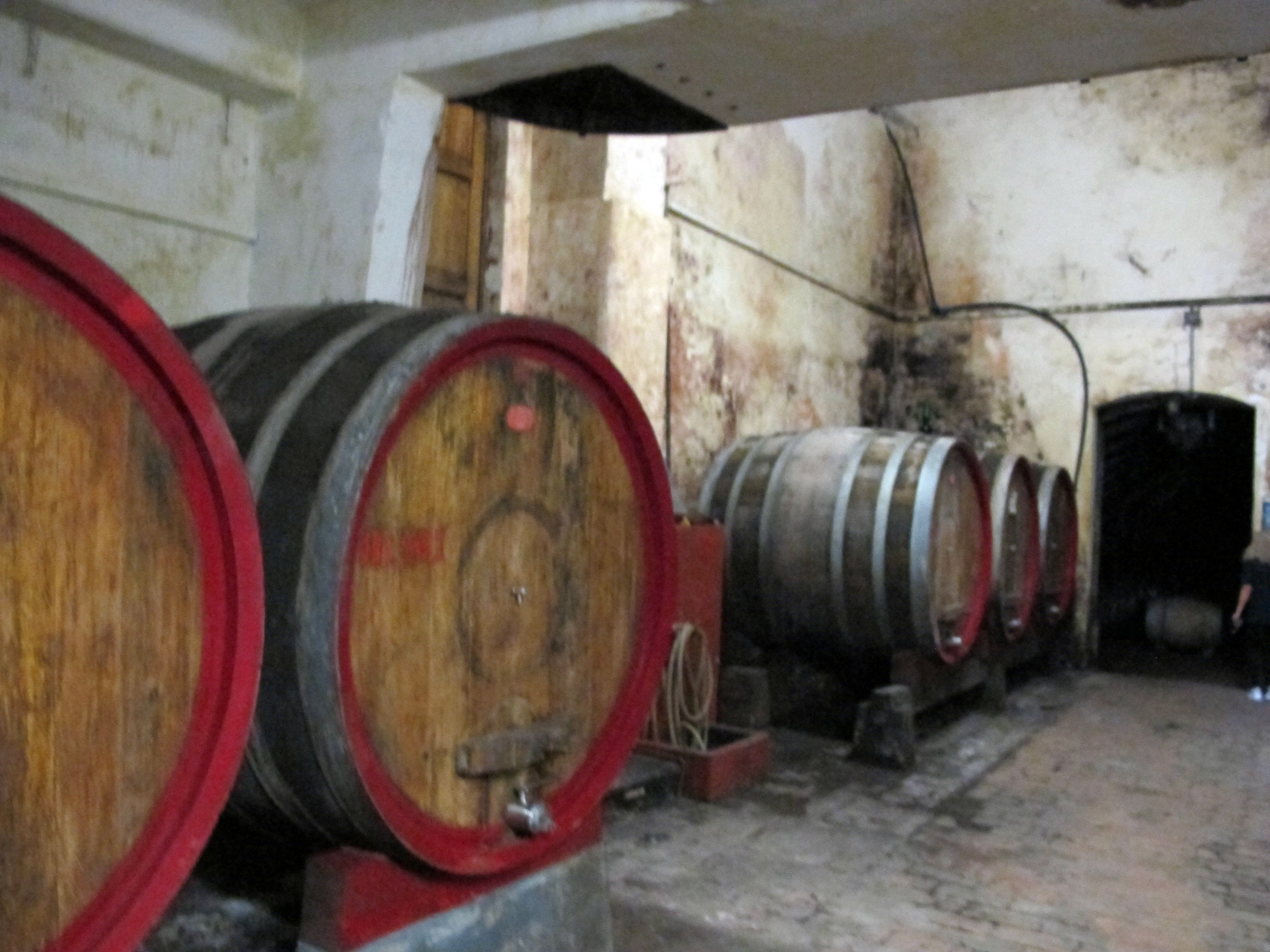

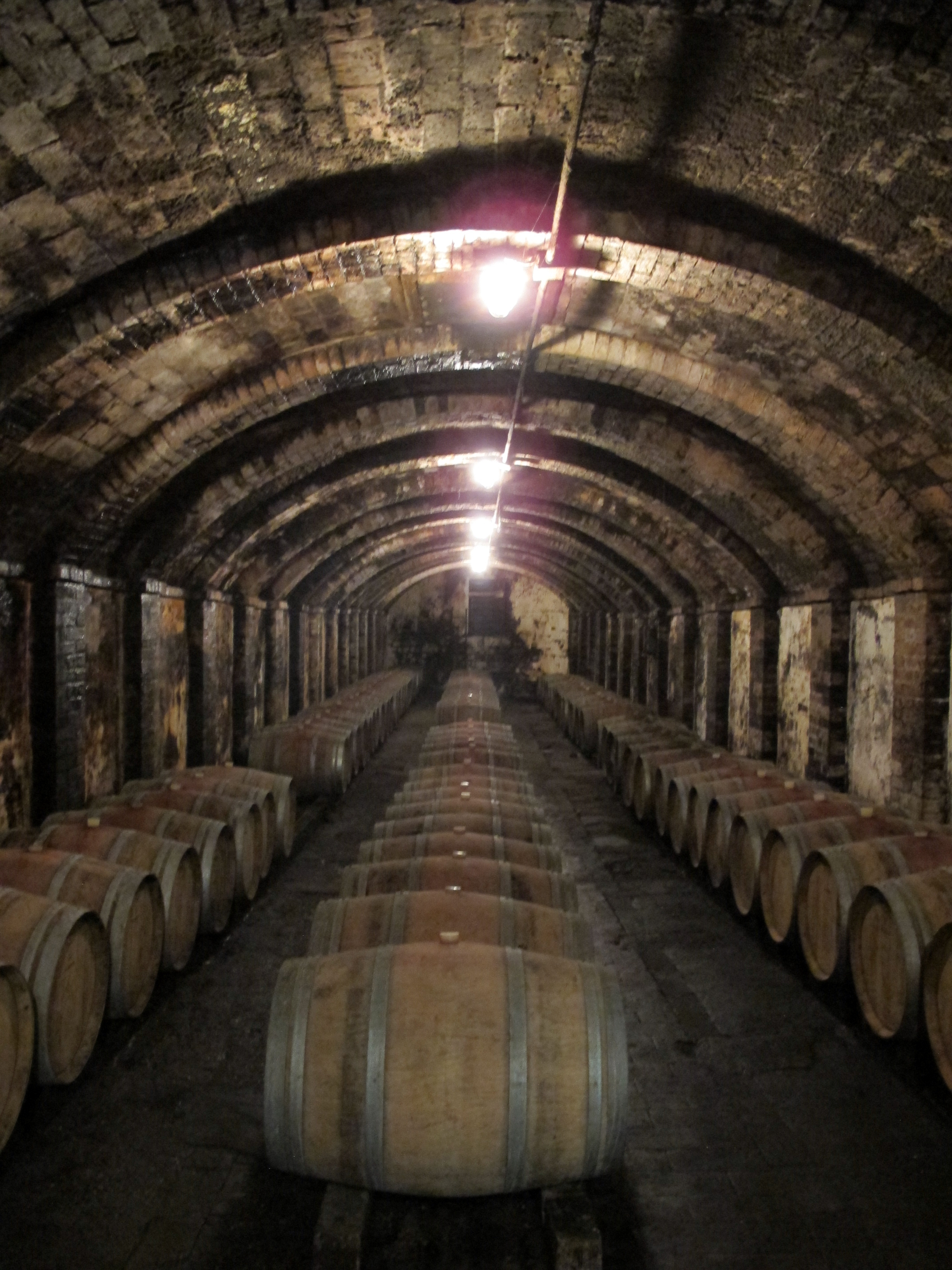

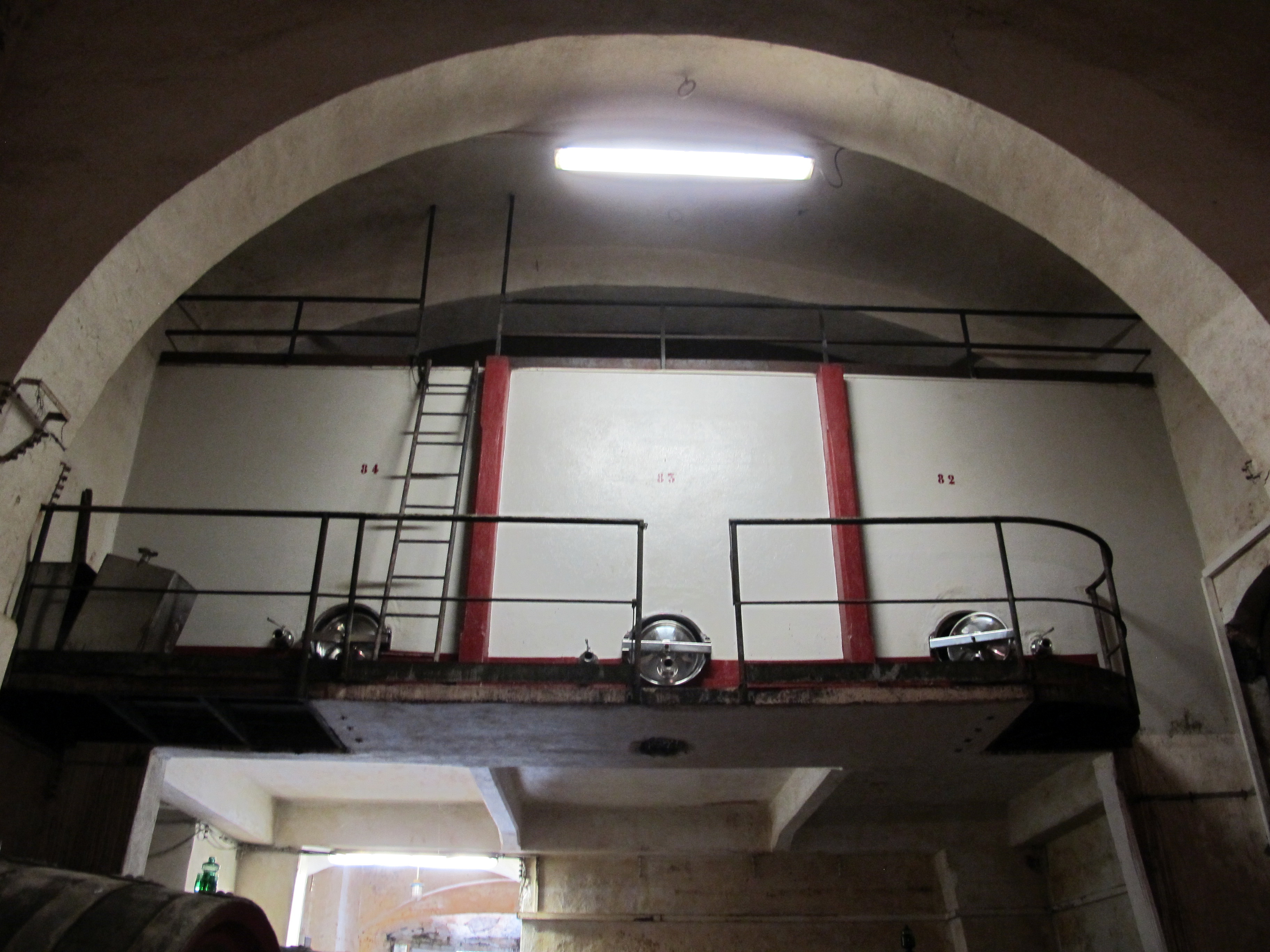

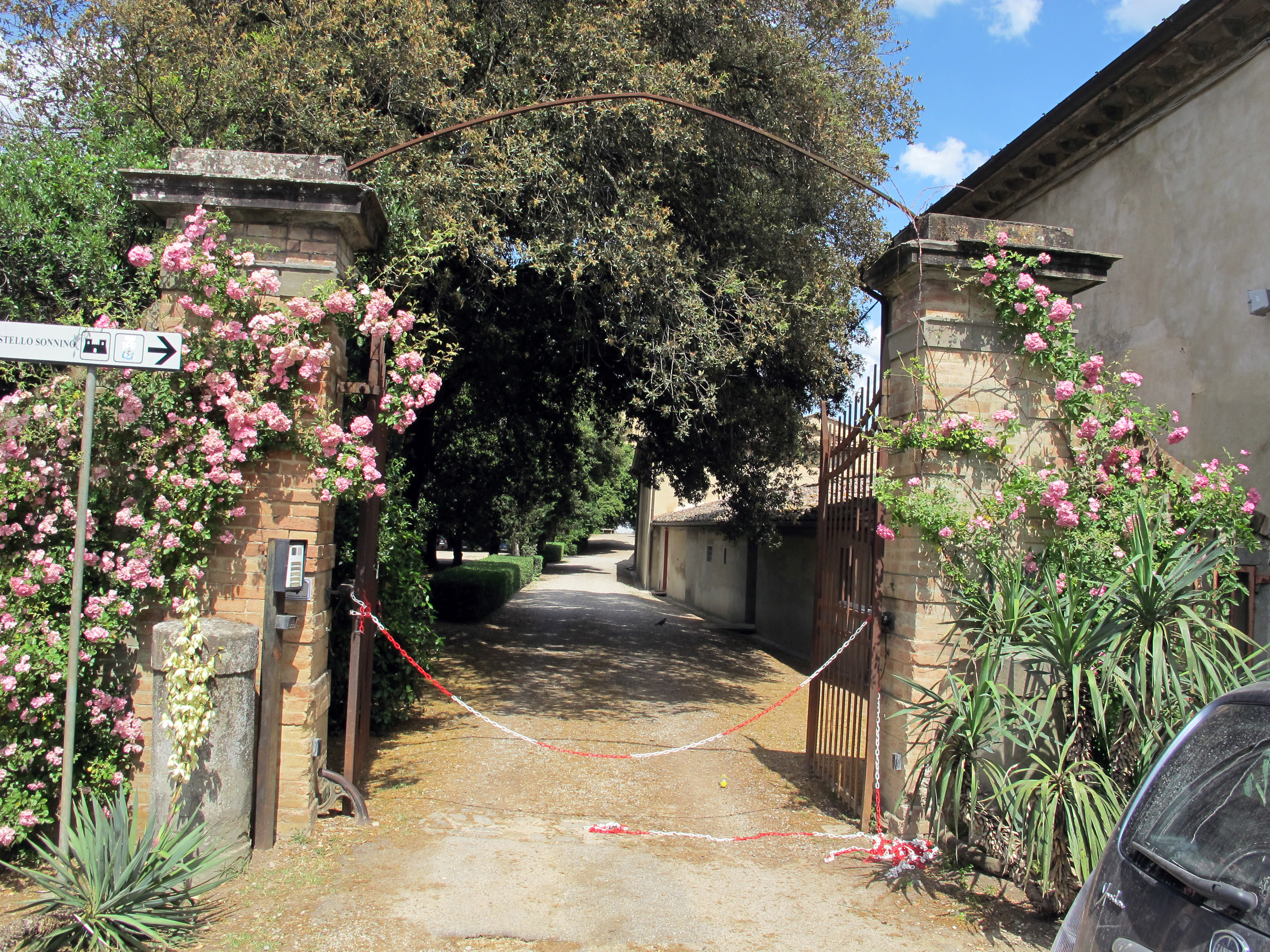

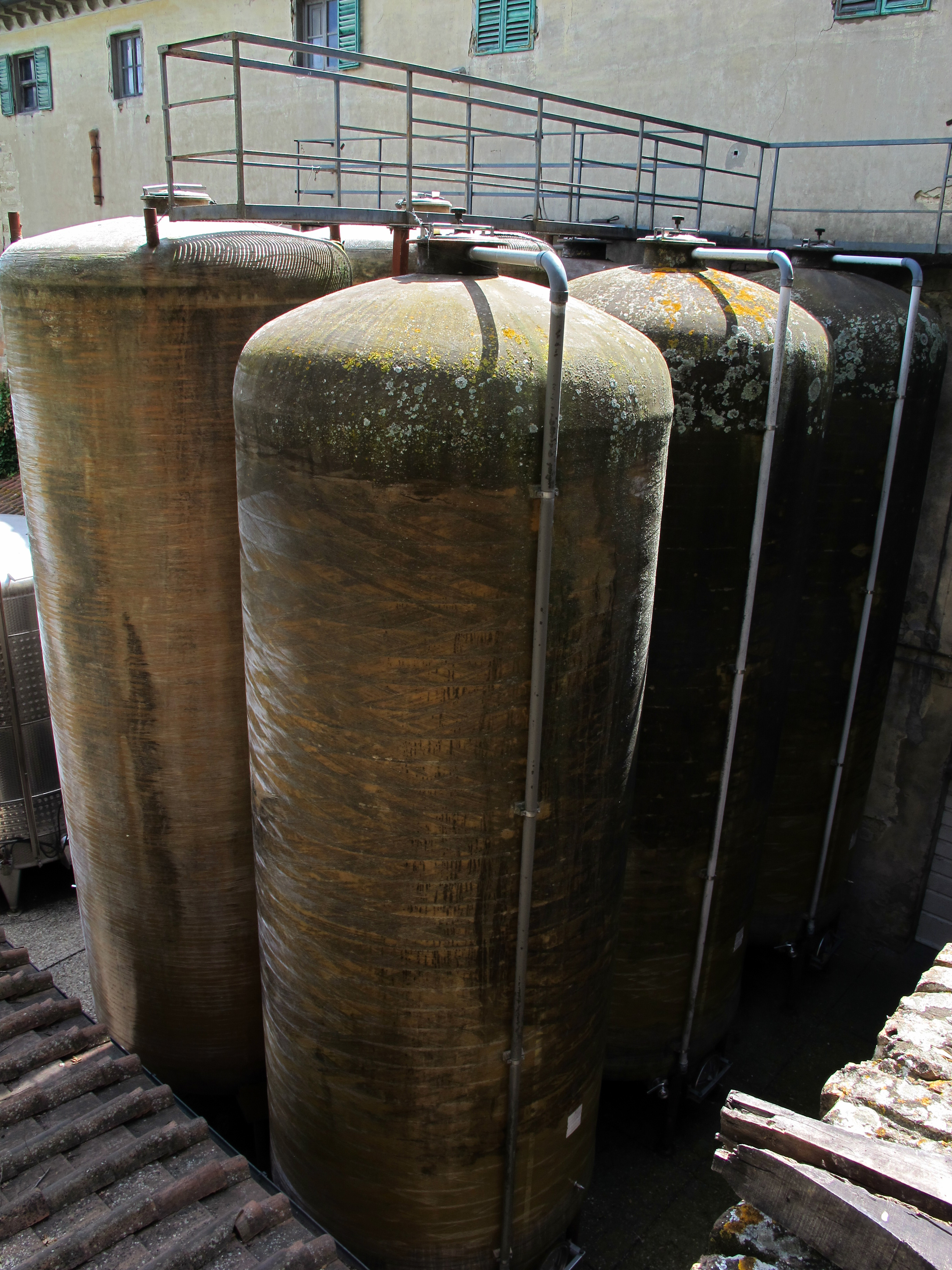
