= Villa di Murlo =

Rural palace or villa in Italy

Coordinates: 43.6061°N 11.1667°E

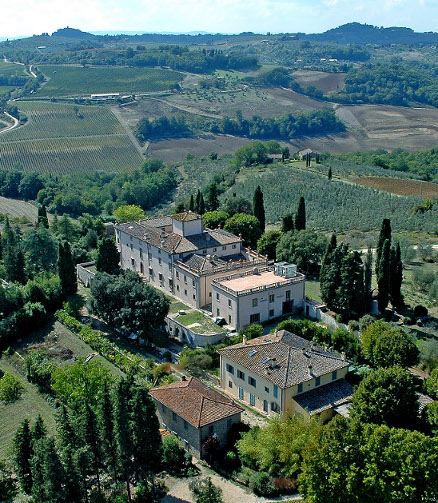

The Villa di Murlo is a rural palace or villa located in the hills surrounding San Casciano in Val di Pesa, on the old road between Florence and Siena that follows the Pesa River.

== History ==
The present villa dates back to the 15th century, but as far back as the Middle Ages the Cavalcanti, a powerful Florentine Guelph family, owned numerous holdings in the locality of Murlo between the Pesa river and its tributary, the Virginio. The old feudal property was destroyed by the Ghibellines after their victory over the Guelphs at the Battle of Montaperti. What remained of the estate was divided up between various members of the Cavalcanti family, and Lorenzo Cavalcanti undertook the task of reconstruction and improvement, as well as buying back neighbouring land, as recorded in a survey from 1498.

Lorenzo's daughter Contessina later married Alessandro Malegonnelle, a prominent courtier, who further enlarged the property. When Contessina was widowed in 1560 the estate was purchased by the wealthy Bongianni Gianfigliazzi (1500–1568), a diplomat for Florence. The Piante dei Capitani di Parte Guelfa of 1584, now found in the Florentine State Archives, mentions a chapel, testifying to the importance of the house. In 1617 the estate was purchased by Angelo and Francesco Baldocci, who commissioned important construction works including the enlargement of the villa and the chapel. The property was inherited in the 18th century by a nephew, Leonardo Spinelli Baldocci, who died leaving no heirs; thus in 1812 the Villa di Murlo was passed on to Gaetano and Carlo Spinello Spinelli. The two brothers administered considerable assets, including – as well as the Baldocci and Spinelli family estates – those of the Dell'Antella family, owners of the precious Vasari Archives. These were held in a room next to the library on the piano nobile of the villa.

When the Spinelli line died out in 1882 the villa passed to Cesare Rasponi Bonanzi (1822–86), son of Spinella Amata Spinelli and count Gabriello Rasponi Bonanzi of Ravenna. Cesare married his cousin Letizia Rasponi Murat, grand-daughter of Napoleon, whose collection of memorabilia was displayed in a room dedicated to the French emperor. Leone, the last Rasponi count, died in 1952 leaving no direct heirs.

== Architectural history ==
The present structure, commissioned in the early 18th century by the Baldocci family, and was designed by the architect Bernardino Ciurini. Between 1723 and 1740 teams of artists decorated the structure, including the stucco artist, Giovan Martino Portogalli. Also employed were the Bolognese painters Anton Domenico and Giovan Filippo Giarré who executed the frescoed classical landscapes, vedute, in the salons on the ground and first floors. At the south west end, those parts of the villa dating from the 16th century were enlarged, incorporating the old 15th-century workers' house. The handsome main Facade to the north west is in the asymmetrical but austere Baroque classical style, which was the last word in urban taste but rare to find in florentine country houses. The south east facade overlooks a raised terrace with formal Italian garden, that conceal a complex of vast, barrel vault wine cellars. Stone steps lead down from the terrace to gently sloping gardens.

Adjacent to the north east end of the villa, completing the picturesque scene, is the late 16th-century chapel. Designed on the classic central plan, it still has visible in the apse a fresco depicting Saint Francis of Assisi receiving the stigmata. Its cupola has a roof of decorative terracotta scales. It would seem from the dedication plaque of Settimia Guadagni Baldocci found in the chapel that the elegant facade was added during the 18th-century enlargement.

== Bibliography ==
- P. Joshua Jacks, W. Caferro, The Spinelli of Florence, Penn State Univ. PR, 2001
- E. Repetti, Dizionario geografico fisico storico della Toscana
- G. Carocci, Il Comune di San Casciano in Val di Pesa, Tipografia Minori Corrigendi, Firenze, 1892
- A. Chiostrini Mannini, Tesori del Chianti, Firenze, 1977
- M.A.Toscano, ARS L'archivio Vasari tra storia e cronaca, Le Lettere, Firenze, 2010
