= Tito Chelazzi =

Italian painter (1834–1892)

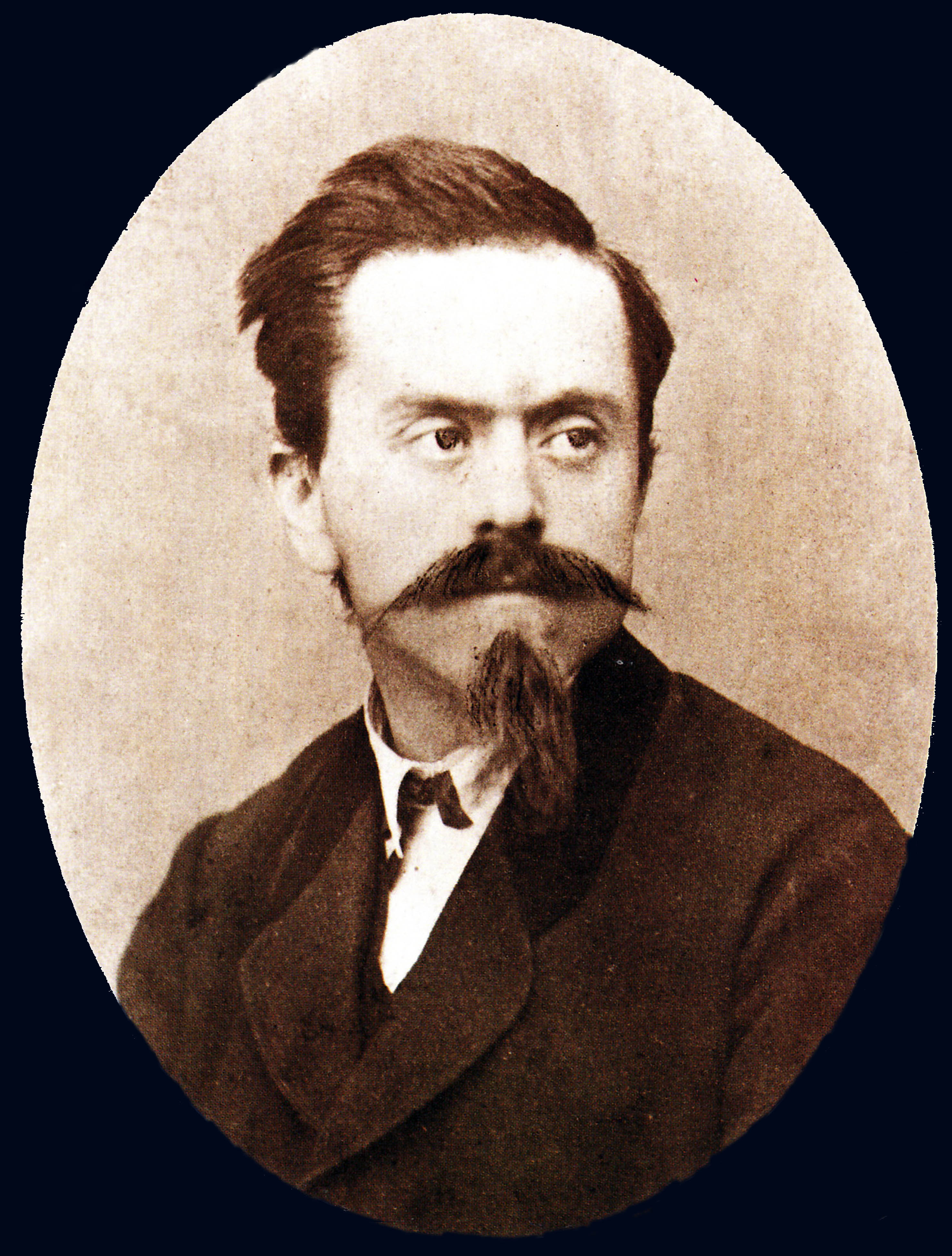
Tito Chelazzi (c.1876)

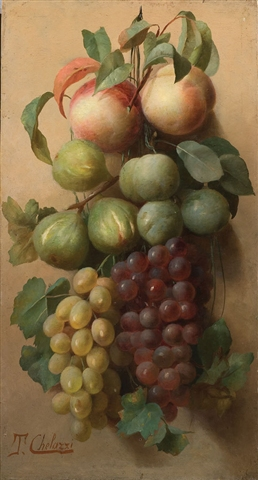
Still-life with Fruit

Tito Chelazzi (1 March 1834 – 12 April 1892) was an Italian still-life painter and war hero.

== Biography ==
He was born in San Casciano in Val di Pesa. His parents were the heirs of a wealthy family from Siena. At first, he planned to become a doctor, but soon left medical school to devote himself entirely to painting. He began by taking lessons from a local artist named Alessandro Martini, then enrolled at the Academy of Fine Arts in Florence. When Martini was engaged to help restore a 13th-century painting of the Annunciation at the Basilica della Santissima Annunziata, Chelazzi became his assistant. His first solo works were images of the Madonna for the chapels of several villas in Florence and San Casciano.

In 1859, he enlisted with the 18th regiment of Bersaglieri to fight for Italian independence. When he returned he found a position in the studios of Stefano Ussi, who later became a close friend. In 1861, he had his first exhibit, together with Ussi, at the "National Arts and Crafts Exposition" in the Stazione Leopolda. In 1866, at the beginning of the Third Italian War of Independence, he enlisted in a unit led by Colonel Menotti Garibaldi. He fought in the Tyrolean Campaign and barely escaped death at the Battle of Bezzecca.

Returning to Florence once again, he opened a studio on the Via degli Artisti near the Piazzale Donatello, specializing in still lifes; especially flowers and fruits. His floral subjects proved to be very popular with the noble ladies. His best known regular client was Margherita of Savoy, who paid 500 Lire (then a substantial amount) for a painting of daisies, and then, honouring the painter by paying a visit to his studio, commissioned other works, notably a mirror with painted roses thea. Other noble patrons included the Royal Family of Württemberg, who commissioned floral decorations for cabinets, doors and windows; and Duchess Marie of Mecklenburg-Schwerin, for whom he decorated mirrors that are now in the ballroom of Vladimir Palace. The Duchess of Teck (mother-in-law to George V) when in Florence (June 1884), also visited Chelazzi's studio as she writes in her diary: "In the town, we met Oasperi, who drove with us to Chelazzi's studio to see his flower painting on mirrors".

Despite his connections to high society, he remained shy and humble. In 1888, when he was appointed Knight of the Order of the Crown of Italy, he politely declined the honor. During the following years, his health steadily worsened and he found it increasingly difficult to fulfill all the commissions that came his way. In 1891, he was engaged by the Milanese publisher Fratelli Treves to produce illustrations for the four volume "Book of Flowers", but he was able to finish only the spring volume before his death. He died in 1892 in Florence.
