= Pieve of San Pancrazio (San Casciano in Val di Pesa) =

Church in San Casciano in Val di Pesa, Italy

Coordinates: 43°37′37.29″N 11°08′27.11″E

The Pieve of San Pancrazio is a romanesque-style, Roman Catholic church in San Casciano in Val di Pesa in the Province of Florence in the Italian region Tuscany.

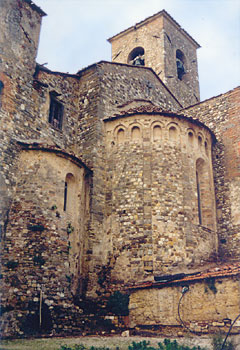
Pieve of San Pancrazio.

== History ==
The church is located on a scenic location, atop a hill dividing the valleys of the Pesa and Virginio streams. A church at the site is documented since the 10th century, and the multiple apses retain a Lombard-Romanesque architectural style. The interior has a nave and two aisles with "matronaei". The interior houses a Madonna with Child of Agnolo Gaddi's school and a Crucifixion by Santi di Tito dating from 1590. Also notable is the studiolo by Cosimo Gheri, a pupil of Santi di Tito, with precious frescoes depicting the liberal arts and poets and scientists of the Classical Era.
