= Montespertoli =

- Comune
- Comune di Montespertoli
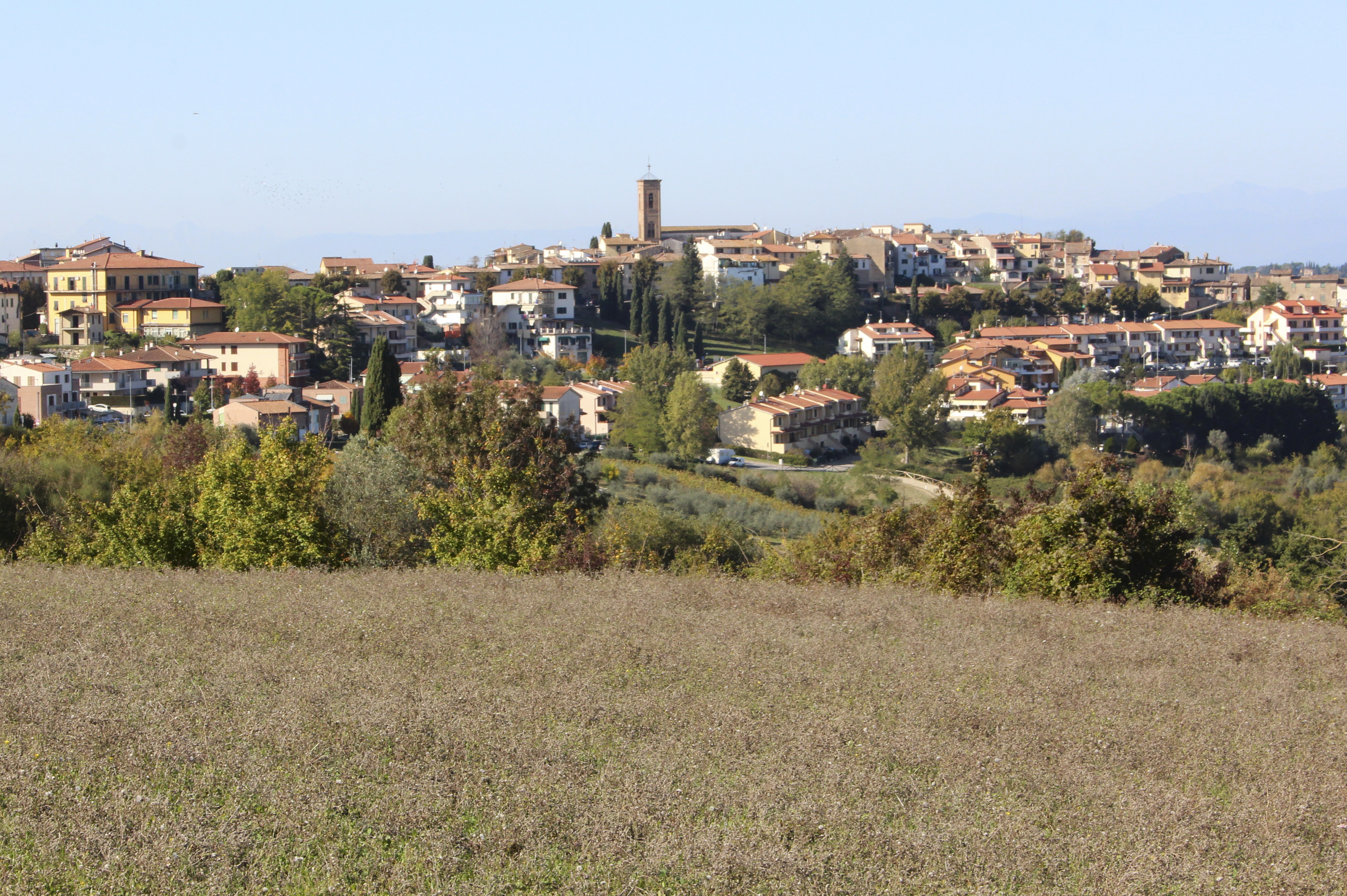
- Machiavelli Square.

- Coat of arms

- Location within Italy Location within Tuscany
- Coordinates: 43°39′N 11°5′E
- Country: Italy
- Region: Tuscany
- Metropolitan city: Florence (FI)
- Frazioni: Aliano, Anselmo, Baccaiano, Botinaccio, Castiglioni, Convento, Fornace, Fornacette, Ghisone, Gigliola, Il Pino II, Il Poggio, La Buca, La Ripa, Le Galvane, Leoni, Lucardo, Lucignano, Martignana, Mela, Montagnana Val di Pesa, Monte Albino, Montegufoni, Ortimino, Poggio Ubertini, Polvereto, Poppiano, San Quirico in Collina, Trecento, Tresanti, Vicchio - Lungagnana

Government
  - Mayor: Giulio Mangani

Area
  - Total: 125.0 km^{2} (48.3 sq mi)
- Elevation: 257 m (843 ft)

Population (1 January 2007)
  - Total: 12,723
  - Density: 101.8/km^{2} (263.6/sq mi)
- Demonym: Montespertolesi
- Time zone: UTC+1 (CET)
  - Summer (DST): UTC+2 (CEST)
- Postal code: 50025
- Dialing code: 0571
- Website: Official website

Montespertoli (Italian pronunciation: [monteˈspɛrtoli]) is a comune (municipality) in the Metropolitan City of Florence in the Italian region Tuscany, located about 20 kilometres (12 mi) southwest of Florence.

Montespertoli borders the following municipalities: Barberino Val d'Elsa, Castelfiorentino, Certaldo, Empoli, Lastra a Signa, Montelupo Fiorentino, San Casciano in Val di Pesa, Scandicci, Tavarnelle Val di Pesa.

The presence of human settlements in the area dates to Roman and Etruscan times, although the villages of the modern municipality are known from the 11th century, when San Pietro in Mercato and Lucardo are mentioned. In 1393 the borough of Montespertoli was acquired by the Machiavelli family.

== Main sights ==
- Pieve (pleban church) of San Pietro in Mercato, consecrated in 1057.
- Pieve of Santa Maria a Coeli Aula, known from the 9th century
- Church of Sant'Andrea in Montespertoli (16th century), housing 12th century fragments of a baptismal font from Santa Maria a Coeli in Aula, and a Madonna with Saints attributed to Niccolò di Pietro Gerini.
- Church of San Michele Arcangelo at Castiglioni (12th century)
- Montegufoni Castle, a former residence of the Acciaioli and later the Sitwell families.
- Sidney Sonnino Castle, former residence of the statesman Sidney Sonnino, now a winery.
