= Sant'Andrea in Percussina =

Frazione in Italy

- Frazione
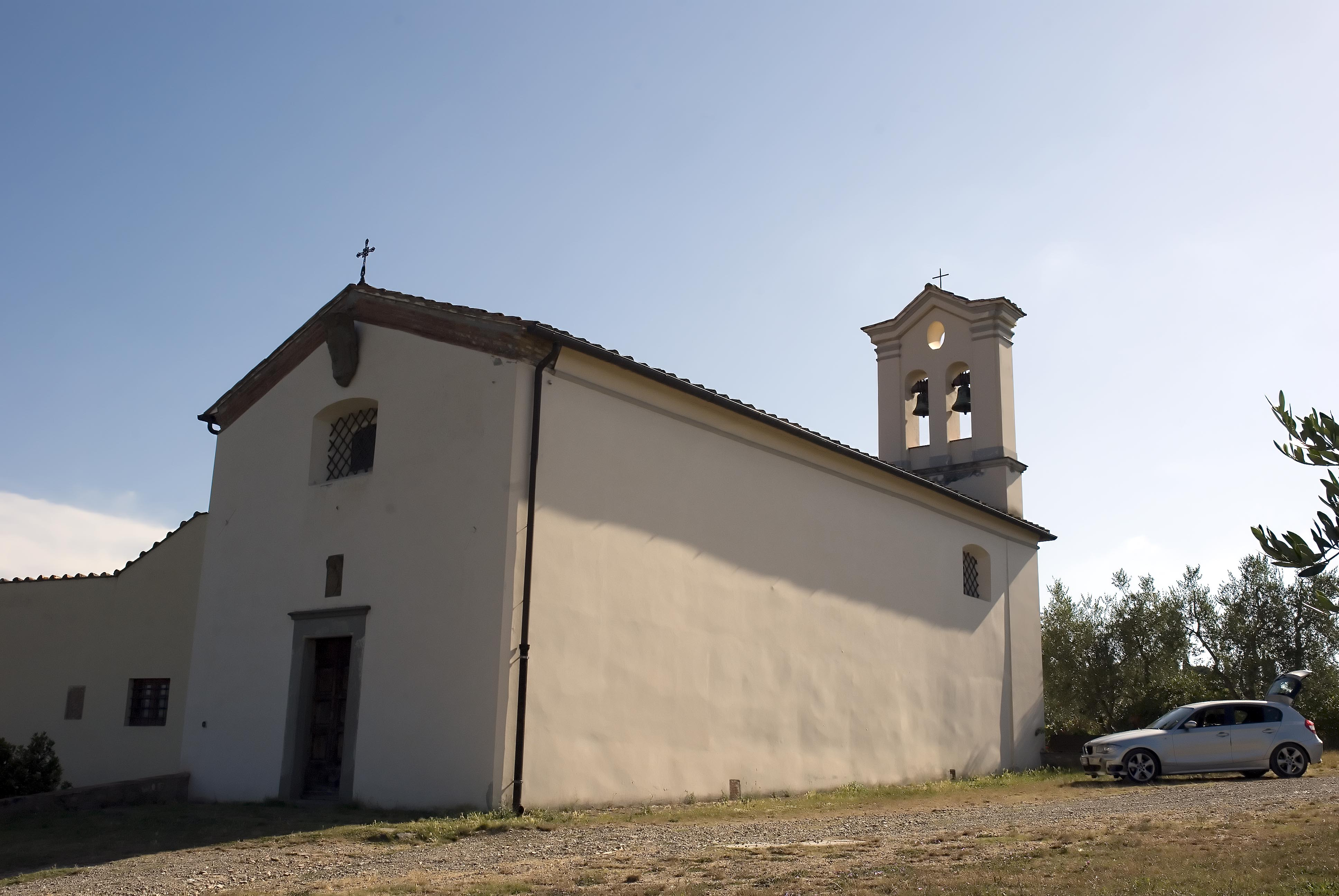

- Location of Sant'Andrea in Percussina in Italy
- Coordinates: 43°40′58″N 11°11′50″E
- Country: Italy
- Comune: San Casciano Val di Pesa
- Time zone: UTC+1 (CET)
  - Summer (DST): UTC+2 (CEST)

Sant'Andrea in Percussina is a frazione of San Casciano Val di Pesa in the Metropolitan City of Florence, Tuscany, Italy. The village is located between San Casciano Val di Pesa and Florence. (Note: That is, by driving, bicycling, or hiking. Some bus trips require a change in San Casciano, and doubling back on a local bus.) Niccolò Machiavelli wrote his treatise The Prince at his family home here, the Albergaccio, where he lived when in exile. A small museum is dedicated to the great writer; the villa, now Villa Bossi-Pucci, stands close by the Hostel where Machiavelli used to "let off steam".

Also in the village is its namesake church, Saint Andrew in English. Nearby is the thirteenth-century church of San Bartolomeo in Faltignano. This once possessed a painting on wood, depicting Saint Andrew, by the school of Agnolo Gaddi; and a Madonna enthroned and saints attributed to the school of Filippino Lippi, today in the church of Chiesa nuova Val di Pesa. Not far from Sant'Andrea in Percussina, just outside Spedaletto, is the twelfth-century church of Santa Maria a Casavecchia, which contains a Della Robbia polychrome altarpiece in terracotta. (Note: All the sculptors in the Della Robbia family worked in terracotta and ceramics. The identity of the one who created this altarpiece does not seem to be recorded. As of 2025, this church appears from Google Maps to closed due to repairs.) Also nearby is the Florence American Cemetery.
