= San Casciano in Val di Pesa =

- Comune
- Comune di San Casciano in Val di Pesa
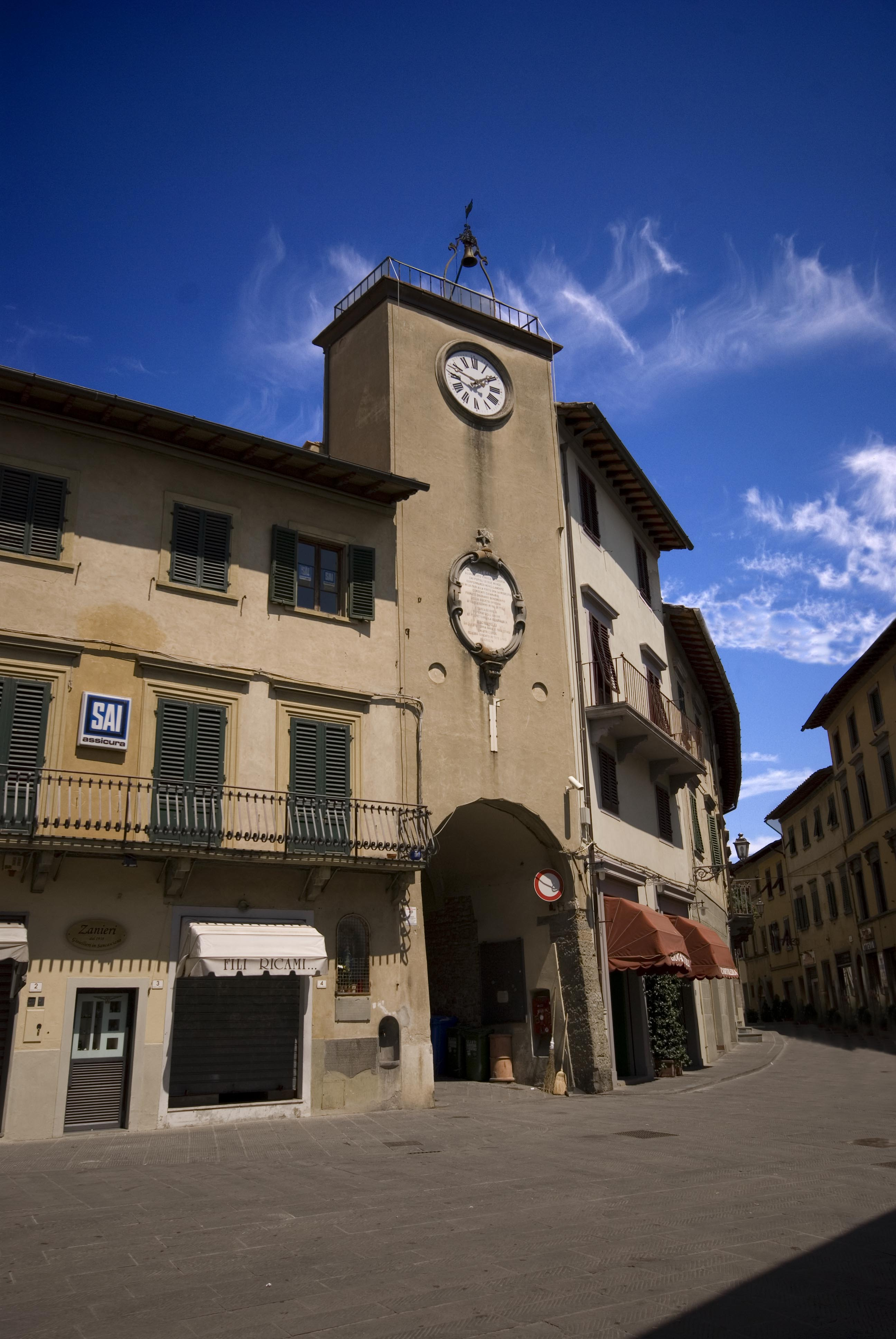

- Coat of arms

- Location within Italy Location within Tuscany
- Coordinates: 43°39′N 11°11′E
- Country: Italy
- Region: Tuscany
- Metropolitan city: Florence (FI)
- Frazioni: Bargino, Calcinaia, Campoli, Cerbaia, Chiesanuova, Cigliano, Faltignano, Mercatale, Montefiridolfi, La Romola, San Pancrazio, Spedaletto, Sant'Andrea in Percussina

Government
  - Mayor: Massimiliano Pescini (from 8 June 2009)

Area
  - Total: 108 km^{2} (42 sq mi)
- Elevation: 310 m (1,020 ft)

Population (2007)
  - Total: 16,802
  - Density: 156/km^{2} (403/sq mi)
- Demonym: Sancascianesi
- Time zone: UTC+1 (CET)
  - Summer (DST): UTC+2 (CEST)
- Postal code: 50026
- Dialing code: 055
- Patron saint: Saint Cassian of Imola
- Saint day: August 13
- Website: Official website

San Casciano in Val di Pesa is a comune (municipality) in the Metropolitan City of Florence in the Italian region Tuscany, located about 15 kilometres (9 mi) southwest of Florence.

San Casciano in Val di Pesa borders the following municipalities; Greve in Chianti, Impruneta, Montespertoli, Scandicci and Tavarnelle Val di Pesa.

== History ==
San Casciano's territory was inhabited since Etruscan times, as evidenced by archaeological findings in Montefiridolfi (The Bowman's Grave) and Valigondoli (Poggio La Croce's excavations). In Roman times San Casciano was a post-stage (mansio) posted at the tenth mile from Florentia. The toponym "Decimo" (i.e. tenth) is still attached to the Pieve di Santa Cecilia a Decimo (a parish church near San Casciano which was mentioned in 1043 in a document and commemorates a milestone (decimum lapidem) on an important Roman road (probably that linking Florentia and Sena Julia). Archaeological findings and toponymic evidence are clear evidence of the town's antiquity, and that there was a significant population is indicated by the large number of parish churches in the area (e.g. Pieve di Santa Cecilia a Decimo, Pieve di San Pancrazio, Pieve di San Giovanni in Sugana and Pieve di Santo Stefano a Campoli), not to mention the significant number of subordinate churches. There is little doubt that the area was still densely populated in the Middle Ages, based upon the many castles which were built at the time for the bishopric of Florence or powerful families like the Buondelmonti or Cavalcanti.

San Casciano was originally mentioned as a fief of the Bishop of Florence, who made its first statutes in 1241. In 1278, the domain shifted to the Republic of Florence. A few years later San Casciano became the capital of a local alliance, including the Alliance of Campoli, and the seat of a podestà, therefore having the government of forty parish churches. By 1325 San Casciano had become so important that a statute of the Florence podestà described one of the main roads departing from the city as follows: "strada per quam itur ad ‘"Sanctum Cassianum"’ (…) versus civitatem Senarum et versus romanam Curiam" (i.e. "the road going through San Casciano towards Siena and Rome”). That San Casciano's history is bound to its roads is shown also by its shape, which is in the form of a cross: one side going from Florence to Siena and the other, following the hills' ridge, linking the Chianti area with Montelupo and the Arno river basin. Furthermore, a major role in San Casciano's development was played by the improvement in agricultural productivity resulting from sharecropping, which led to population growth and the formation of commercial centres like Mercatale and the castle of San Casciano "a Decimo" itself.

The walls of this castle were built in the second half of the 14th century (and their ruins still exist today). Indeed, in the first half of the same century, San Casciano was completely undefended and therefore became an easy prey for condottieri and mercenary troops. San Casciano was occupied by the Holy Roman Emperor Henry VII from November 1312 to January 1313, the Duke of Lucca Castruccio Castracani in February 1325, and the French mercenary Moriale D'Albarno in July 1343. In consequence of these attacks, the Republic of Florence decided to fortify the village in 1354. The walls were in place by 1355 and, in addition, a "cassero" (i.e. a castle serving as barracks) was added in 1356.

A few years earlier, Walter VI of Brienne, Duke of Athens had planned to transform the village into a castle, to be called "Castel Ducale", but the plan died with him. In 1494 Charles VIII of France camped near the village without entering it. Before his departure, he donated a large sum of money to the local Franciscan convent. In 1512 at the Albergaccio (near to Sant'Andrea in Percussina) Niccolò Machiavelli started his exile during which he wrote The Prince and The Mandrake. When the Grand Duchy of Tuscany rose to power, San Casciano lost its military and strategic role and its history followed that of Tuscany.

In 1893, after the annexation of the Grand Duchy of Tuscany to the Kingdom of Italy, a steam-engine railroad was built to link San Casciano and Florence.

On 26 July 1944, during World War II, San Casciano was almost entirely destroyed by an Allied bombardment. It has been slowly but finely reconstructed.

== Main sights ==
=== Pievi (Parish churches) ===
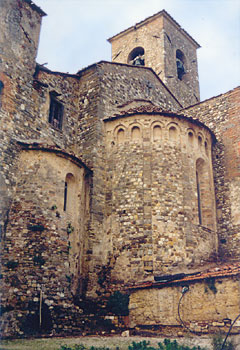
Pieve of San Pancrazio.

- Pieve of San Pancrazio, located on the hill dividing the valleys of the Pesa and Virginio streams. Known since the 10th century, it has noteworthy apses of Lombard architectural style. The interior has a nave and two aisles with matronaei. Works of art include a Madonna with Child of Agnolo Gaddi's school and a Crucifixion by Santi di Tito dating from 1590. Also notable is the studiolo by Cosimo Gheri, a pupil of Santi di Tito, with precious frescoes depicting the liberal arts and poets and scientists of the Classical Era.
- Pieve di Santo Stefano, in the frazione of Campoli, built in the 9th century. It was a possession of the bishops of Florence, including the future Pope Clement VII, who served here as priest. In the 18th century, the interior was renovated along Baroque lines and a portico was added.
- Pieve di Santa Cecilia is located in the frazione of Decimo. It is mentioned in a document by Charlemagne dated 774. Heavily restored in 1728, it has a nave and two aisles; only the bell tower remain of the original Romanesque edifice.
- Pieve di San Giovanni in Sugana, located 232 metres above sea level near to the frazione of Cerbaia. It was mentioned in a document of 1019 with the name of Pieve di Soana. The façade presents an original Romanesque portal and single lancet window.

=== Other churches ===
- Chiesa del Suffragio (Santa Maria del Gesù), now housing the Museum of Holy Arts, with a Madonna Enthroned (1319) which is the first known and dated work by Ambrogio Lorenzetti, and the Stories of St. Michael Archangel (c. 1250) by Coppo di Marcovaldo
- The Church of Santa Maria al Prato or della Misericordia, founded by the Dominicans in 1304. It has a single nave with four altars on its sides: the second right altar houses the important Crucifix by Simone Martini. Also noteworthy are the white and green marble pulpit by Giovanni di Balduccio (1336–1339) and a wooden Crucifix from about 1470.

=== Castles ===
- Castle of Bibbione. Built before 1000, this castle belonged to the Buondelmonti family who restored it in the 11th century. In the 16th century it passed to the Machiavelli family who kept it as hunting manor till 1727. The castle has magnificent courtyards and halls. From outside it has an impressive shape, something between a fortress and a sixteenth-century manor house.

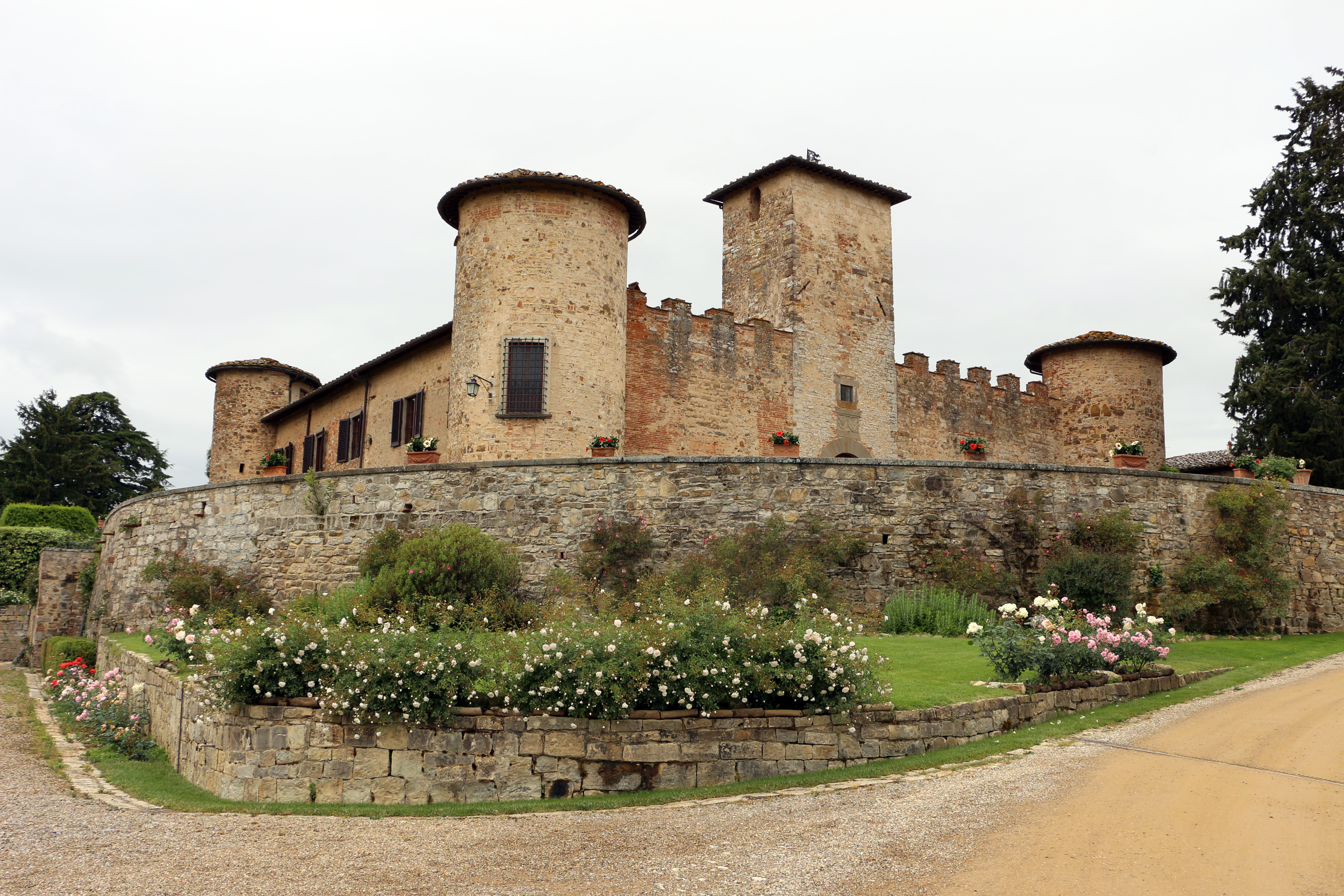
Castle of Gabbiano.

- Castle of Gabbiano. According to 11th century sources, it was originally built around a square tower which served as a bulwark on the road to Greve in Chianti, one of the most important routes between Florence and Siena. It was enlarged in the 13th century by the Bardi family of Florence. The rounded towers, revealing a French influence, were added in 1505.
- Castle of Pergolato. Built by the Buondelmonti family, Pergolato was originally used as a bulwark for the defence of the family's feudal domains, then served as a hunting lodge. It has huge decorated halls and elegant arcades. It is built on the steep cliffs standing on the left bank of the Pesa river.
- Castle of Montefiridolfi, also owned by the Buondelmonti family. Today mostly rebuilt, but the original structures and architectures are still visible.

=== Others ===
- The Bowman's Grave. Found in 1978 during agricultural works, it is an Etruscan grave dating back to the 7th century BC. Its name derives from a large slab with a bas-relief representing a bowman. The original slab is preserved at the Museum of Holy Arts in San Casciano.

== Economy ==
San Casciano is highly renowned for the production of wine and olive oil. The principal cellars of the wine company Antinori are established in San Casciano. A mutual bank (Banca di Credito Cooperativo del Chianti Fiorentino, now Chianti Banca) was established by don Narciso FUSI Proposto di San Casciano and has its main offices in San Casciano. The rest of the economy is mainly based on handicrafts and tourism (especially agritourism). In the 20th century it was a quite important centre of the Italian typographical industry.

== Twin towns – sister cities ==
San Casciano in Val di Pesa is twinned with:

- Al Mahbes, Western Sahara
- Morgan Hill, United States
- Nieuwerkerken, Belgium
- Rosh Pinna, Israel

== Famous people ==
- Giuliano Dami (1683–1750), Italian adventurer, intimate friend of the last Gran Duke of Tuscany, Gian Gastone de' Medici, born in the frazione of Mercatale.
- Niccolò Machiavelli (1469–1527), Italian writer and politician exiled in 1513 in Sant'Andrea in Percussina. As H. G. Wells wrote, Machiavelli "took up his quarters in a villa near San Casciano, twelve miles or so from Florence, and there entertained himself partly by collecting and writing salacious stories to a friend in Rome, and partly by writing books about Italian politics in which he could no longer play a part. Just as we owe Marco Polo’s book of travels to his imprisonment, so we owe Machiavelli’s Prince, his Florentine History, and The Art of War to his downfall and the boredom of San Casciano."
- Giuliano Ghelli (1944–2014), Italian painter, resided in San Casciano in Val di Pesa his entire adult life. The town's Museo Civico was named after him in May 2015.
- Antonio Petrocelli (1953), Italian actor, member of the San Casciano in Val di Pesa's City Council.
- Sidney Sonnino (1847–1922), Italian politician, Prime Minister of the Kingdom of Italy, elected at the Italian Parliament in 1880 for the San Casciano in Val di Pesa's constituency.
- Tito Chelazzi (1834–1892), Italian painter and decorator for the House of Savoy; also a hero from the Third Italian War of Independence.

== See also ==
- Chianti tramway
