= Giuliano Ghelli =

Italian painter

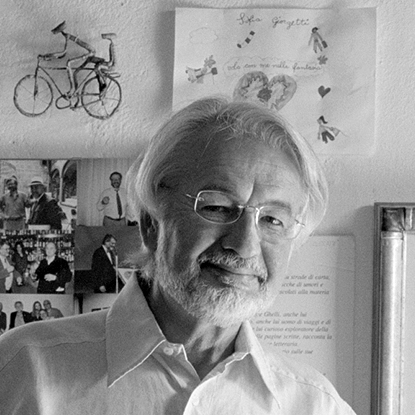
- Giuliano Ghelli in his studio, 2005
- Born: 10 May 1944; Florence, Italy
- Died: 15 February 2014 (aged 69); San Pancrazio (Florence), Italy
- Known for: Painting, graphic arts
- Movement: Pop art

Giuliano Ghelli (10 May 1944 – 15 February 2014) was an Italian painter who produced several series of works, each rooted in the practice of drawing. An autodidact, Ghelli's early influences were informalism and geometric abstraction, from which he developed a cartoon-like style of figuration inspired by pop art and Surrealism. Ghelli was said to draw on affect over intellect, working personal interests and relations, and, later, dreams into his pictures; the Italian word racconto (narrative or story) often appears in the artist's titles.

== Debut and early work (1962-1978) ==
At age 17 Ghelli began to frequent the studios of several contemporary Florentine painters and soon met the avant-garde art dealer Fiamma Vigo (Italian). Through Vigo's Numero gallery, Ghelli discovered a community of artists and writers who strongly influenced his approach to painting. Ghelli debuted in 1963 with two works on canvas in a group exhibition at Vigo's Numero gallery in Milan. He continued to exhibit his work in Vigo's galleries in Florence and Venice into the late 1960s.

In 1972 Ghelli signed a contract with the Sangallo gallery in Florence; the associated stipend allowed him to paint full-time.

=== Il portapaesaggi (The Landscape Carrier) ===
From 1973 Ghelli's works tended increasingly towards figuration, with crudely drawn elements of landscape (hills, patches of sky, a line of trees at the horizon), road signage, mechanical elements and humanoid-robot figures. In 1974 he published the pocket volume Il portapaesaggi with text by the contemporary art historian Lara-Vinca Masini.

In 1975 Ghelli's paintings were exhibited in New York and Los Angeles and in 1977 Ghelli returned to New York to exhibit his work and travel cross-country. Starting in 1978 Arezzo-based Novart produced a line of jewelry based on Il portapaesaggi.

== Sentiment and narrative (1980-1989) ==
From 1980 a "narrative dimension" emerged in Ghelli's prints and paintings. The sparsely-drawn hills, robots, and signage of the previous decade are joined by envelopes, houses, and the occasional hand-written phrase. In her text describing the paintings in Ghelli's 1983 Ferrara exhibition the critic Maria Luisa Frisa noted "The theme of romantic love ... in all its facets: desire, jealously, abandonment, distance. The interplay of narrative, landscape and technological artifact in Ghelli's work was commented by the art historian Lara-Vinca Masini in her 1989 Arte Contemporanea, noting, in Ghelli's paintings, a "lucid, fable-like transcription of technology and robots."

== Mature work (1990–2014) ==
=== Mechanical themes: Leonardo and Mercedes-Benz ===
In 1990 Ghelli was introduced to the Leonardo scholar Carlo Pedretti, then professor of art history at UCLA. From meetings with Pedretti followed a set of silkscreens and then paintings inspired by Leonardo da Vinci, culminating in the 1992 exhibition In viaggio con Leonardo in Milan. Ghelli would continue to reference Leonardo's work, in particular the illustrations of the Codex Leicester, in several works from the 1990s onwards.

Ghelli's Leonardo paintings were noticed by Jochen Prange, the head of Mercedes-Benz Italia S.p.A., and led to a commission for twenty paintings for the company's new Rome headquarters, which hosted a one-man exhibition for the artist in 1995.

=== The Aborigeni, Migrazioni, and Esercito di terracotta ===
Many of Ghelli's canvases from the late 1990s are densely packed with color and form. In his text "Ghelli's 'Horror Vacui'", Carlo Pedretti characterized this period's style as "painting that does not allow empty space" linking it to the workings of the subconscious and dreams.

In 2000, a trip to Sydney, Australia and a reading of Bruce Chatwin's novel The Songlines led Ghelli to paint series of canvases referencing Aboriginal symbols and Dreamtime. In this same period the artist painted a series of works on paper and canvas depicting shoals of fish, each with the title "Migrazione". These series were cited by some critics as evidencing Ghelli's interest in dreams and in the ancestral and unchanging.

Ghelli's Esercito di terracotta (Terracotta Army) resulted from the artist extending his practice of painting fabric tailors busts to sculpting and decorating pre-fabricated, fresh clay forms. Through carving, stamping, and the application molded shapes, Ghelli created approximately fifty small terracotta female busts (each 25 cm high) soon followed by a larger series (about 75 cm high). Some journalists and public figures associated the work to the partially-excavated Terracotta Army of Xi'an.

=== The "Cantiere" and the Segreti ===
In 2011 the artist created an art lab for secondary school students called the "Cantiere Giuliano Ghelli" (Ghelli work site). Concurrently, Ghelli had been experimenting with twine wrapped around his pieces, one of which he brought into the art lab. Ghelli invited the students to "write on a small piece of canvas … a phrase no one would ever read". Each such piece was then "folded ... soaked in glue, placed under the twine and covered with paint." The resulting painted tailor's bust belongs to a series of mixed media works called "Segreti" (Secrets) made between 2011 and 2014.

== Select one-man exhibitions ==
- 1967 Fiesole, saletta Mino da Fiesole
- 1971 Florence, Davanzati gallery
- 1972 Florence, Sangallo gallery; Bologna, Cherry Gallery
- 1974 Milan, Nuovo Sagittario gallery; Paris, Maison des Lettres de l'Université de Paris
- 1975 Florence, Sangallo gallery; New York, Queens College, Paul Klapper Library; Los Angeles, Bernstein Gallery
- 1981 Milan, Studio Steffanoni
- 1983 Ferrara, Massari 2 gallery
- 1992 Milan, Castello Sforzesco, Sala del Tesoro
- 1995 Montelupo Fiorentino, Museo della Ceramica; Rome, Mercedes-Benz Italia headquarters
- 1997 Siena, Duomo, Cripta delle statue; Miami, Faustini Arte gallery; Colonia, Istituto Italiano di Cultura
- 2001 Prato, Museo Pecci, La Parola colorata
- 2005 Certaldo, Palazzo Pretorio; Knokke, Belgium, Knokke Art Museum
- 2006 Fiesole, Roman amphitheater, Museo Archeologico
- 2008 Florence, Palazzo Medici Riccardi
- 2009 Florence, Palazzo Vecchio, Sala d´Arme
- 2010 Prato, Castello dell’Imperatore; Lucca, Lucca Center for Contemporary Art
- 2013 Florence, Palazzo Panciatichi

== Select group exhibitions ==
- 1963 Milan, Numero gallery
- 1964 Venice, Numero gallery; Florence, Numero gallery
- 1965 Florence, Numero gallery, 27 Motivazioni
- 1966 Venice, Numero gallery; Florence, Numero gallery
- 1969 Bologna, Museo Civico, Proposta per una manifestazione
- 1973 Florence, Sangallo gallery; Florence, Giorgi gallery, Segno ’73; Milan, Nuovo Sagittario gallery
- 1974 Florence, La Piramide gallery; Menton, Biennale Internationale d’Art; Bruxelles, Centre Culturel D’Auderghem
- 1975 Rome, X Quadriennale nazionale d'arte di Roma, 'La nuova generazione'
- 1993 Malmö, Sweden, I ponti di Leonardo
- 2005 Frankfurt am Main, Germany, DIE GALERIE, Figurative Kunst aus Italien; Moscow, Russia, M’ARS Contemporary Art Museum, Il cappello e la creatività
- 2006 Moscow, Russia M’ARS Contemporary Art Museum, The Sun, the Moon and the Theory of Opposites
- 2010 San Miniato, Palazzo Inquilini

== Recognition ==
1973: awarded a scholarship offered to young artists by the city of Florence.

1975: participated in the 10th edition of the Quadriennale nazionale d'arte di Roma.

1975: included by noted critic Tommaso Paloscia (Italian) in Bolaffi Arte's annual listing of "top Italian artists".

1980: included in Bolaffi Arte's listing of "leading Italian graphic artists".

2006: awarded, with three other artists, the critic's Vela d'oro at the 51st edition of the Rassegna di pittura Marina di Ravenna.

2013: awarded the Gonfalone d’argento, top honor of the Consiglio Regionale della Toscana.

2013: named Commendatore dell'Ordine al Merito della Repubblica Italiana.

On the artist's birthday in May 2015 the Museo Civico di San Casciano Val di Pesa was rededicated as the Museo Giuliano Ghelli.

== Public collections ==
Palazzo Vecchio, Direzione di Servizi Territoriali Integrati (1st floor), Servizio Musei Comunali, Florence, Italy

Museo della Contrada Priora della Civetta, Siena, Italy

Museo archeologico di Massa Marittima and Complesso mussale di San Petro all'Orto, Massa Marittima (province of Grosseto), Italy

== Books ==
Lara-Vinca Masini, Giuliano Ghelli, Il portapaesaggi, 1974.

Claudio Nobbio, Stefano Giraldi, Sergio Staino, Giuliano Ghelli, Eclisse Parziale, 1998, Florence, City Lights Italia.

Marina Nordera, La Bella addormentata nel bosco [Sleeping Beauty], text by Patrizia Veroli, illustrations by Giuliano Ghelli, 2003, Palermo, L'Epos.

== Select exhibition catalogs ==
Ghelli, curated by Aldo Passoni, 1974.

Giuliano Ghelli, curated by Maria Luisa Frisa, 1983.

Giuliano Ghelli. Proiezioni metafisiche dell'immaginario, curated by Lara-Vinca Masini, 1989, Mantova, Cleb Gallery

In viaggio con Leonardo, curated by Carlo Pedretti, 1992, Milano, Riproduzioni ABC di Sergio Necchi.

La Parola colorata, curated by Nicola Micieli, texts by Umberto Cecchi, Marco Pistoia and Maurizio Vanni 2001, Prato, Centro Pecci, Studio Bibliografico Pratese.

Il cappello e la creatività, curated by Maurizio Vanni, 2005, Poggibonsi (SI), Carlo Cambi Editore.

La fabbrica della fantasia, curated by Ilario Luperini, 2011, Pontedera (PI), Bandecchi & Vivaldi.

Giuliano Ghelli. 50 anni in viaggio tra pittura e scultura, curated by Sandra Stanghellini, texts by Cristina Acidini, Nicola Danti, 2013, Florence, Palazzo Panciatichi, Consiglio Regionale della Toscana.

Genius Loci. Fiabe dipinte, curated by Giovanna M. Carli, texts by Giovanna Carli, Eugenio Giani, Andrea Ferrante, 2016, Florence, Polistampa.

Giuliano Ghelli inedito. Gioco e forma in opere dal 1963 al 1983 nel clima fiorentino contemporaneo, curated by Mirella Branca, texts by Mirella Branca, Lara-Vinca Masini, Barbara Casalini, 2018, Florence, Polistampa.

== Bibliography ==
Catalogo nazionale Bolaffi d'arte moderna n.10, segnalati Bolaffi 1975 50 artisti scelti da 52 critici, Torino, Giulio Bolaffi Editore, vol.III

Catalogo nazionale Bolaffi della grafica n.10, incisioni, litografie e serigrafie di 676 artisti italiani, realizzate nel 1979/1980, Torino, Giulio Bolaffi Editore

Lara-Vinca Masini, Arte Contemporanea. La Linea dell'unicità, 1989, Florence, Giunti.

Lara-Vinca Masini, Arte Contemporanea. La Linea del modello, 1996, Florence, Giunti.

Maurizio Vanni, Giuliano Ghelli. Le vie del tempo, additional texts by Giuliano Ghelli, Carlo Pedretti, Sandra Landi, 2005, Poggibonsi (SI), Carlo Cambi Editore.

Michele Loffredo, Intra Tevere et Arno. Musei e collezioni pubbliche d'arte contemporanea del territorio aretino, 2014, Florence, Nerbini.
