= House of Machiavelli =

Coordinates: 43°40′57.59″N 11°11′51.01″E

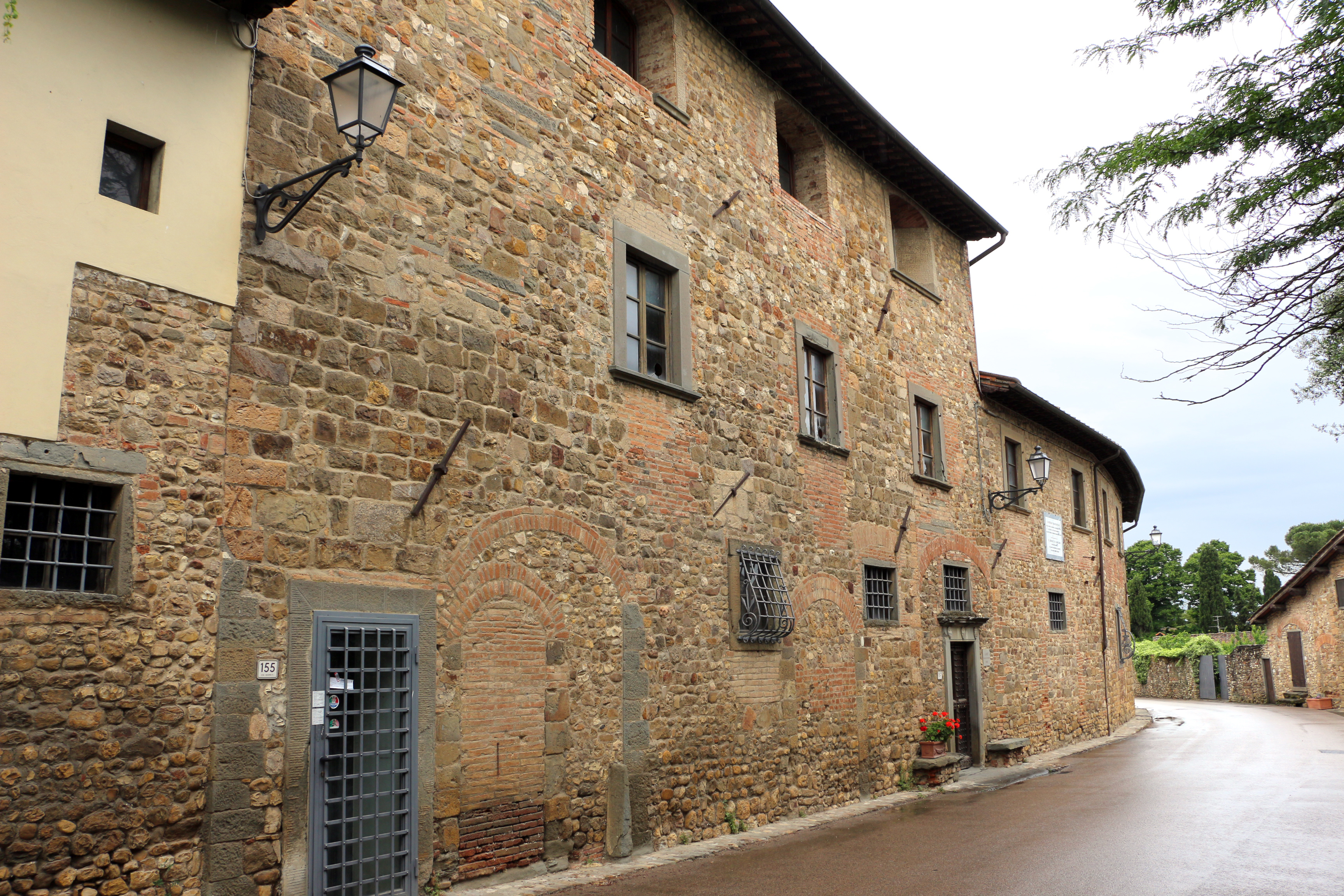
House of Machiavelli

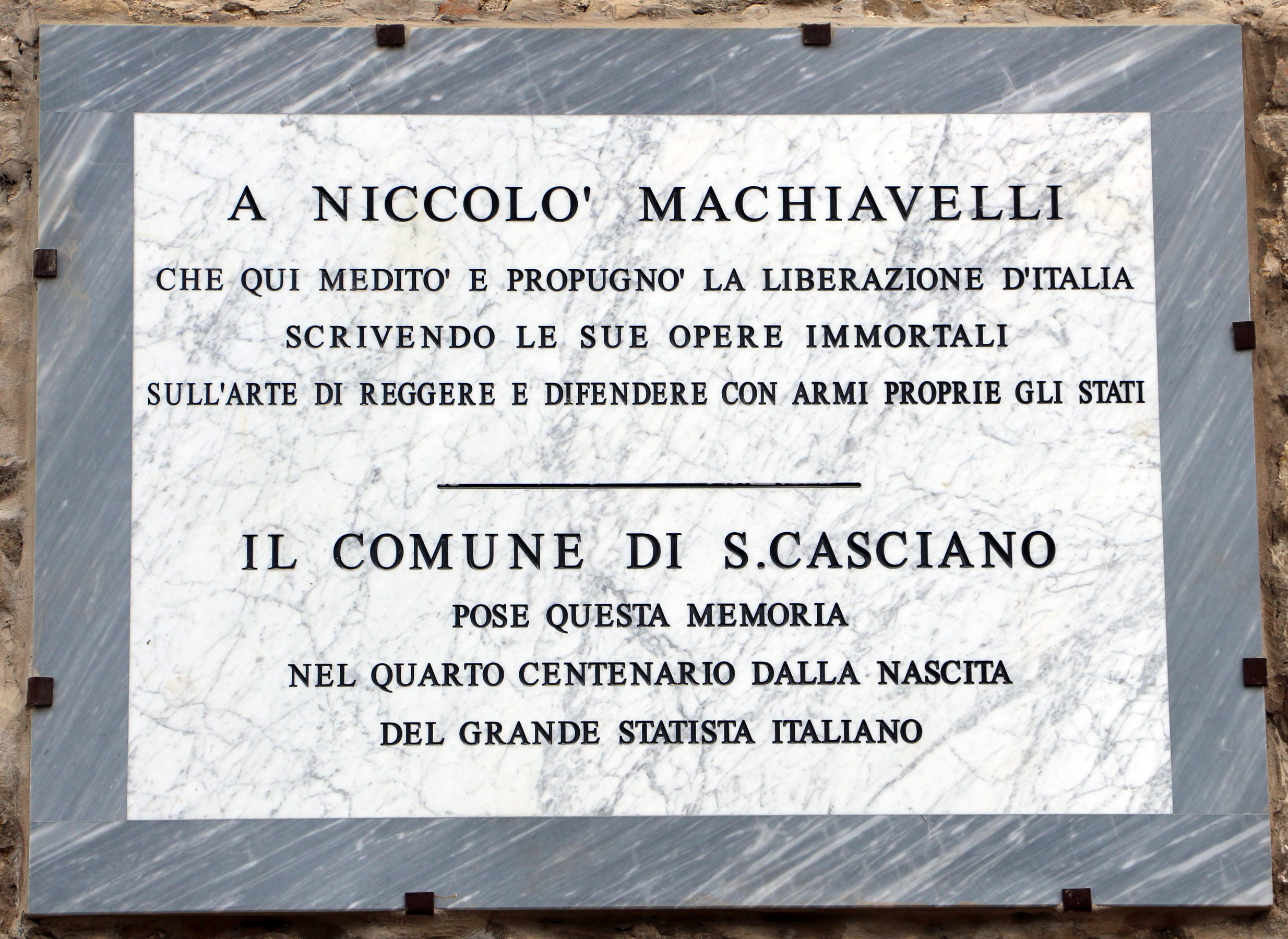
The commemorative plaque

The house of Machiavelli (Italian: Casa di Machiavelli), also referred to as L'Albergaccio (Italian: [lalberˈɡattʃo], literally "The Bad Hotel"), was the place where Niccolò Machiavelli lived during his exile from Florence. This is located in Sant'Andrea in Percussina in San Casciano in Val di Pesa, in the province of Florence, Tuscany, Italy

== L'Albergaccio ==
Niccolò Machiavelli (1469–1527) was secretary to the second chancery of the Republic of Florence from 1498 to 1512, when the Medici were out of power. Machiavelli lived in this house when he was exiled from Florence when the Medici came back in power in 1512. This house, including the attached tavern L'Albergaccio, is described in one of his most famous letters to Francesco Vettori from 10 December 1513. In this letter, Machiavelli described his typical day characterized by daily work to run the farm and the nights spent in the restaurant playing with the owner and the local butcher. He spent the rest of the night reading, and writing his most famous book, The Prince.

The house remained owned by the Machiavelli family and subsequently was inherited by the noble Florentine family Serristori. Currently the house is owned by the Gruppo Italiano Vini which has made the property one of its most prestigious vineyards. Today it is possible to visit the house; its wine cellar; and, via an underground path, the tavern as described by Machiavelli.
