= Mercatale in Val di Pesa =

Coordinates: 43°38′05″N 11°13′55″E

- Frazione
- Location of Mercatale in Val di Pesa in Italy
- Country: Italy
- Time zone: UTC+1 (CET)
  - Summer (DST): UTC+2 (CEST)

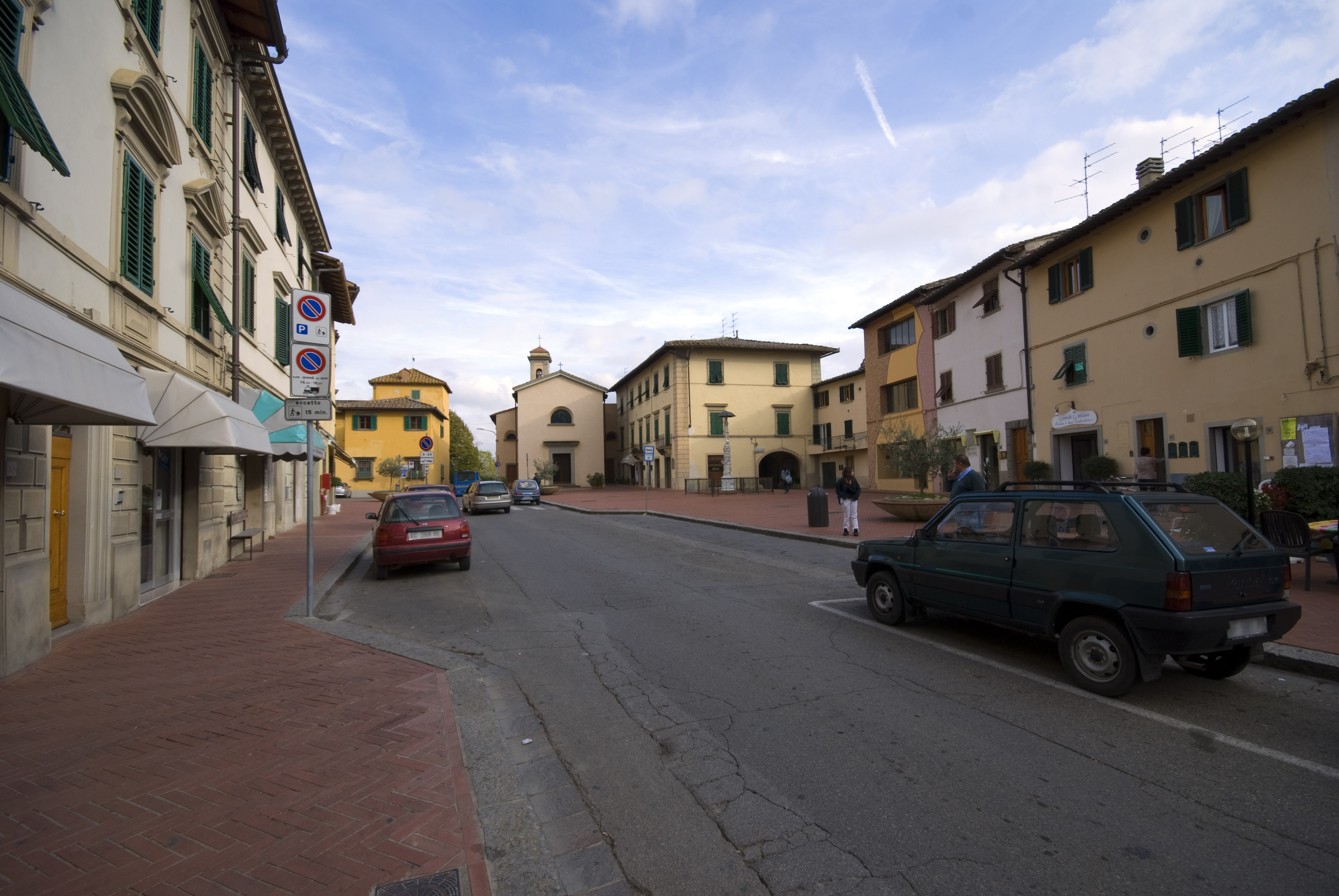
Mercatale in Val di Pesa

Mercatale in Val di Pesa is an Italian frazione (village) situated in the Comune (municipality) of San Casciano in Val di Pesa.

Some of the interesting places for visiting Mercatale are: Chiesa di Santa Maria (church of Saint Mary) and Piazza Vittorio Veneto.

The village is also a place for agritourism.
