= Lucignano, Montespertoli =

Lucignano
- Frazione
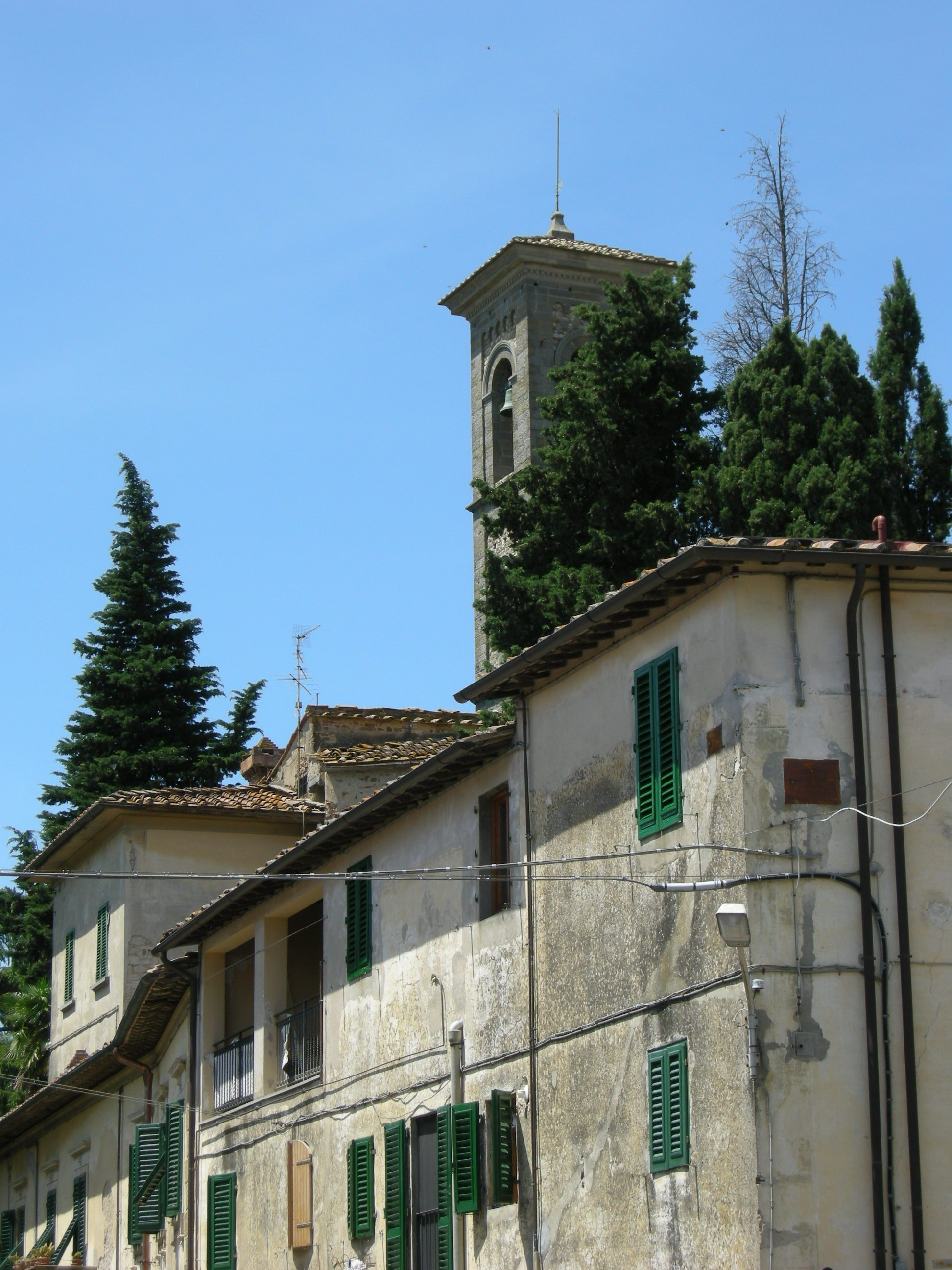

- Location of Lucignano in Italy
- Coordinates: 43°37′49″N 11°7′46″E
- Country: Italy
- Region: Tuscany
- Province: Florence (FI)
- Comune: Montespertoli
- Elevation: 308 m (1,010 ft)

Population (2011)
  - Total: 238
- Time zone: UTC+1 (CET)
  - Summer (DST): UTC+2 (CEST)

Lucignano is a village in Tuscany, central Italy, administratively a frazione of the comune of Montespertoli, Metropolitan City of Florence. At the time of the 2001 census its population was 232.

== Location ==
Lucignano is about 30 km from Florence and 5 km from Montespertoli.
