= Cèllere Codex =

1524 letter describing America's east coast

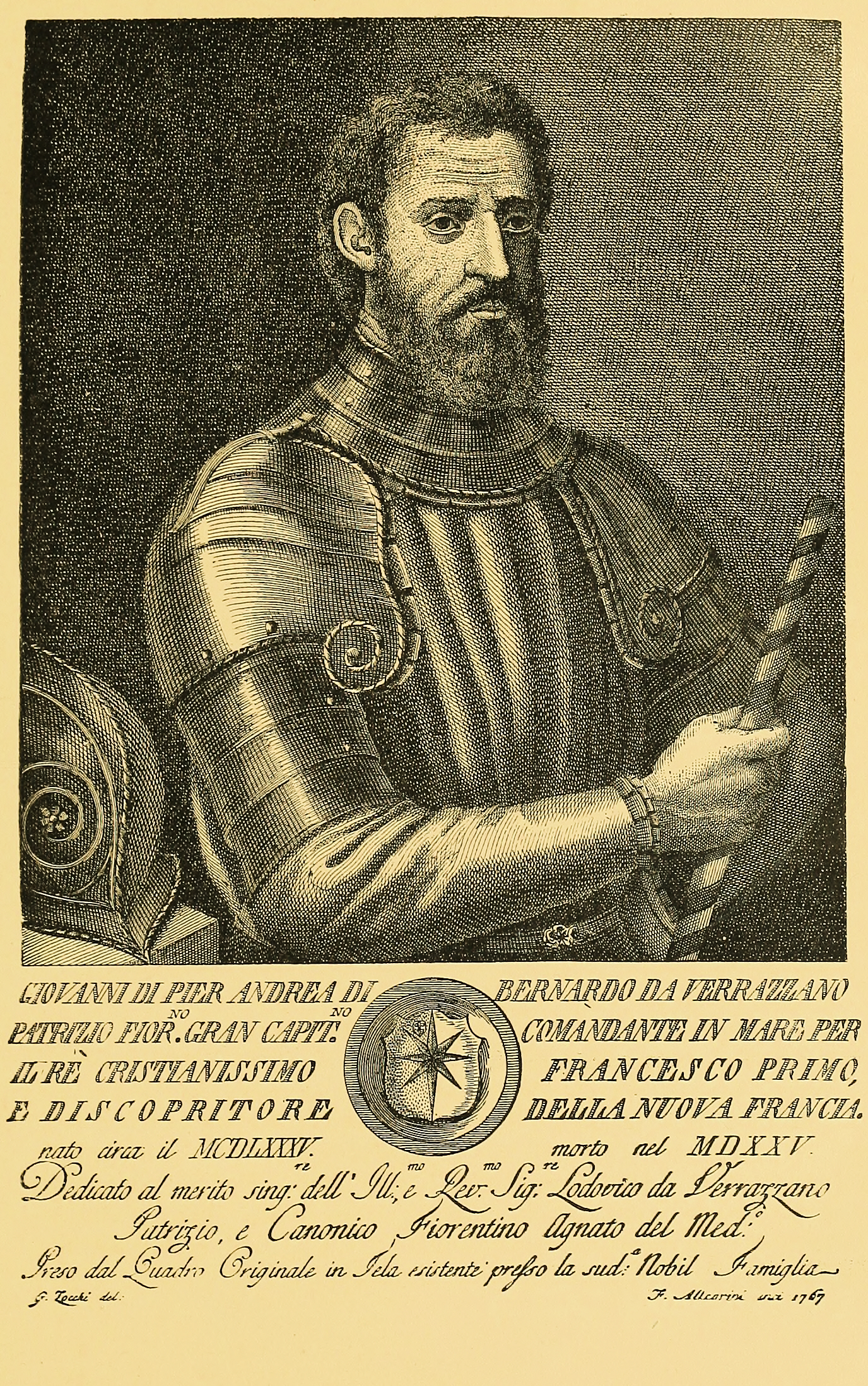
Giovanni da Verrazano

The Cèllere Codex (officially, Del Viaggio del Verrazzano Nobile Fiorentino al Servizio di Francesco I, Ri de Francia, fatto nel 1524 all'America Settentrionale, also Morgan MS. MA. 776) is one of three surviving copies of a manuscript letter sent by Giovanni da Verrazzano (1481–1528) in 1524 to King Francis I of France describing the former's navigation of the East Coast of the United States. It is nowadays preserved at the Morgan Library of New York.

Verrazzano was an Italian who lived in France, and he undertook his voyage in Francis' service. The King, prompted by the French mercantile community, charged Verrazzano to discover whether there was a direct passage from the Atlantic to China and Japan.

The Codex is considered by scholars to be the most important of the three copies, although there is debate as to how much weight should be given to some of the detail it provides. Over twelve pages, the Codex describes how Verrazzano sailed due west from Madeira in December 1523, and in little more than a month had arrived at North Carolina. From there they journeyed south, towards Florida. This direction was not without danger, as Florida represented the northerly point of the Spanish Empire, and Spanish warships patrolled the sea. (Note: The Spanish regularly patrolled the Straits of Florida from their base in Hispaniola (now the Dominican Republic)) Verrazzano then turned northwards again and, hugging the coast, passed Virginia, New Jersey, and eventually New York, where he anchored in what is now New York Harbor. He then continued north around New England, to Newfoundland, where, with provisions running low, he turned eastwards. Verrazzano and crew returned to Dieppe in July 1524. The Codex describes Verrazzano's journey in a far greater degree of detail than the other versions of his letter, which may be because it was originally transcribed by Verrazzano's brother, and then further annotated by Verrazzano himself. It was sent via a series of letters to colleagues of Verrazzano in France and then to Italy, where it then remained undiscovered in a Viterbo library until the early twentieth century. Until its discovery there had been some doubt as to whether Verrazzano had ever made the voyage at all.

== Background ==
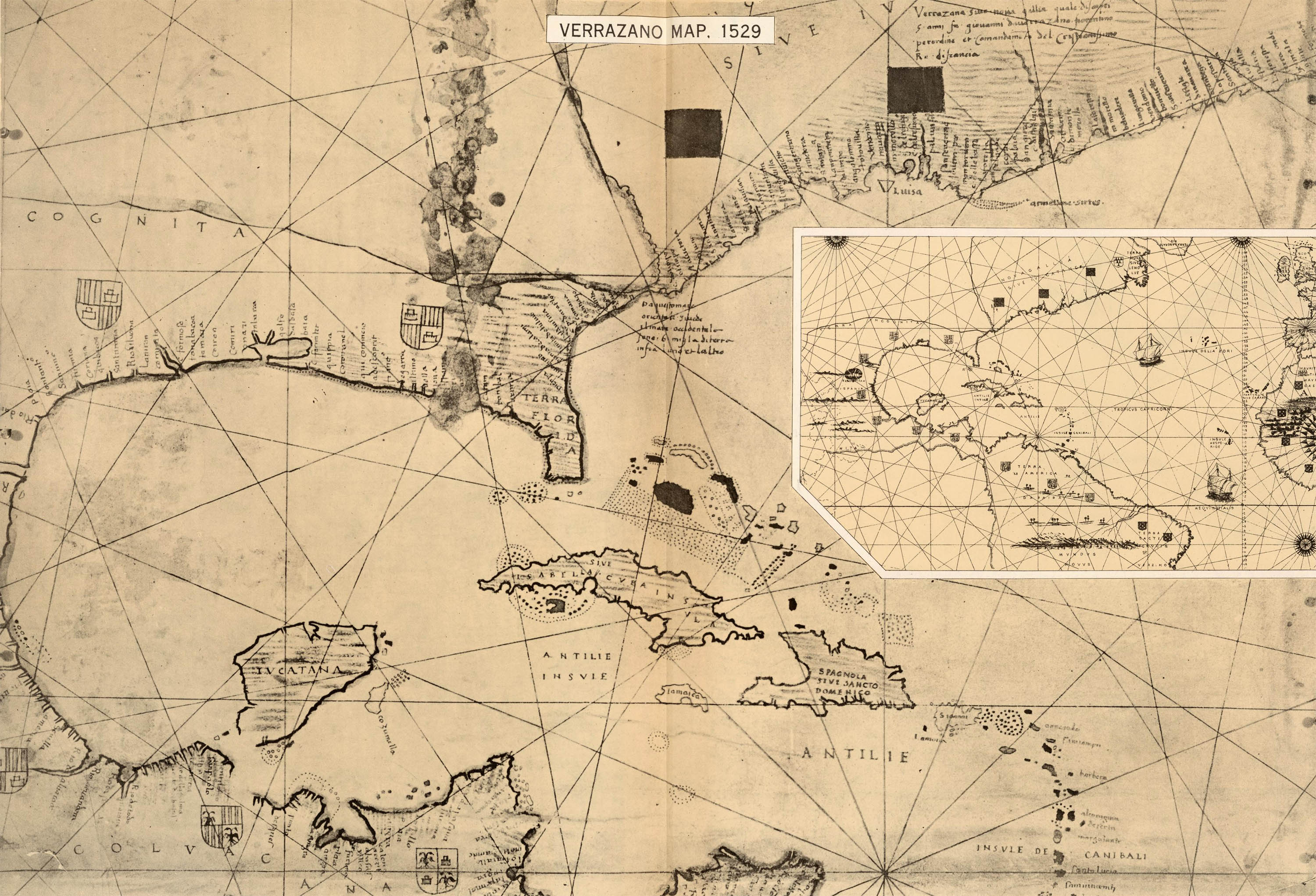
Girolamo de Verrazzano's 1529 map of his brother Giovanni's 1524 voyage along the East Coast of America.

Verrazzano's fellow Italian, Christopher Columbus, (Note: In fact, most of the famous navigators of the early years of the "Golden Age of Discovery" were Italian. One scholar has commented that, " Although no Italian power would ever achieve any territorial holding or interest in America, Italian navigators were at the forefront in the discoveries and explorations on behalf of the early modern national colonial enterprises (Cabot for the English, Columbus for the Spanish, Vespucci on behalf of the Spanish and Portuguese, and Verrazzano for the French)".) in the service of the Catholic Monarchs of Spain, had reached the New World in 1492, and over the next thirty years, three European nations — the English, Portuguese and Spanish —investigated the new continent, claiming land for their respective monarchs when possible. A few years after Columbus, John Cabot made multiple voyages to Newfoundland in the service of the English king, Henry VII. In September 1522 Spaniard Juan Sebastián Elcano made the first circumnavigation of the globe, and in the following year the king of France, Francis I, was persuaded to dispatch an expedition. This was under the command of the Florentine explorer and humanist Giovanni da Verrazzano. Verrazzano was tasked with discovering a westward-passage to China, which would enable traders to avoid the treacherous Strait of Magellan. This was the goal Columbus had originally set out to achieve over 30 years earlier.

Lyon was the hub of France's silk industry, and a newer, shorter such passage would protect and increase their lucrative trade with Cathay. Francis was a willing backer, although no royal commission survives for the expedition: France had a particularly bitter commercial rivalry with Portugal, which repeatedly led to armed clashes in the areas where their mutual interests overlapped, such as the Brazilian and West African coasts. On the other hand, Francis wanted Portugal's assistance in the war in Italy. (Note: King John III of Portugal claimed only to be interested in suppressing French piracy, although Robert Knecht has said that, "he was, in fact, hostile to all French shipping in what he regarded as Brazilian waters and gave orders for its destruction".) More immediately, his finances were sufficiently precarious (Note: Previous kings of France had not shown interest in Atlantic exploration as had Spain and Italy. King Francis was predominantly occupied with the Italian Wars, which were "almost continuous".) to render an expedition worthwhile only if it discovered new wealth for France. It has been suggested that Verrazzano too was intending to profit personally from his voyage of discovery. The Lyonnais mercantile community was almost exclusively Florentine, (Note: So important were Florentine merchants in Lyon that they were known as the "Florentine Nation" in the city. Lawrence Wroth has described how they "held control, among the many grants of privileges made them, over certain business operations of the city, among them la charge de distribuer les paquettes de lettres venus de pais loingtains et amasser ceux que l'on veult envoyer dehors. Essentially, they controlled the distribution of mail entering and leaving Lyon.) like Verrazzano, and effectively formed an expatriate community. Records dating from March the previous year suggest that together Verrazzano and these merchants had formed a syndicate at the expedition's planning stage. This was intended to divide both the investment and the profit from the voyage between them; they are described as tous marchans florentins (French for "all Florentine merchants").

Verrazzano left France with a ship provided and paid for by the King, a 100-ton caravel called La Dauphine. He had a crew of 50 men, materiel and provisions sufficient for eight months at sea in December 1523. Verrazzano chose a course across the mid-Atlantic, perhaps aware that by now Lucas Vasquez de Ayllon had mapped the area as far north as 33° 30' and that Juan Ponce de León had extended Spanish influence from South America up to Florida. This course ensured him the best chance of discovering a western passage while avoiding the Spanish fleet. After forty days sailing they reached and landed just north of Cape Fear, near Myrtle Grove Sound, North Carolina. Verrazzano named this new continent "Francesca", after his King. He knew he had not reached China, as he described it as "a new land which had not been seen before by any man, either ancient or modern".

== The Codex ==
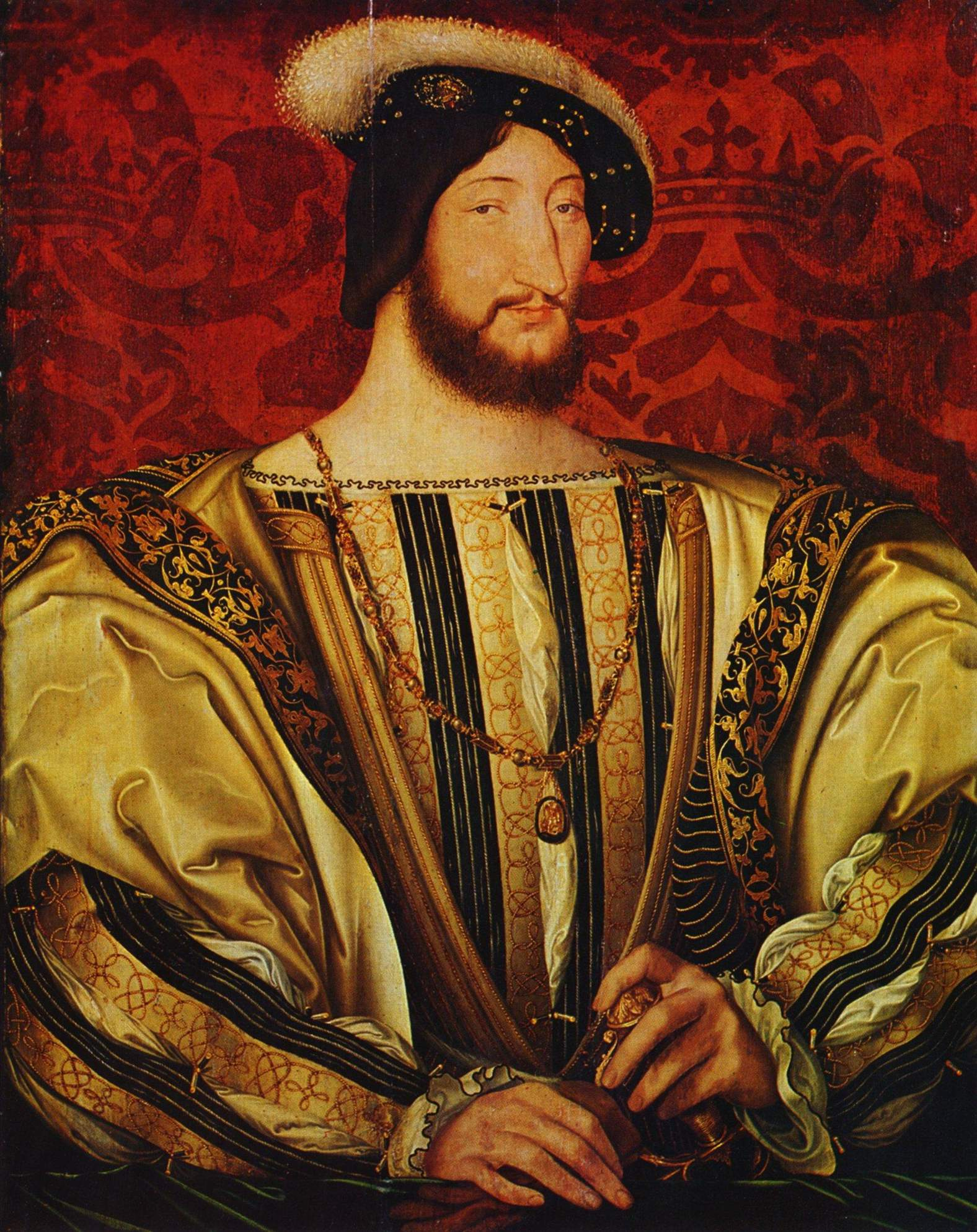
Portrait of Verrazzano's patron, Francis I of France (1494–1547), by Jean Clouet, c. 1530

=== Discovery ===
The Cèllere Codex is a manuscript attributed to Verrazzano held in the library of Count Guido Macci of Cèllere in 1908, after which it is named. It was discovered by Italian scholar Alessandro Bacchiani in 1908, who published a critical edition the following year. (Note: Bacchiani posited that the Codex was written by someone close to Verrazzano, perhaps his brother Gerolamo. The marginalia is sufficiently detailed that it might comprise Verrazzano's personal interjections and opinions, he said, and "even suggests", says Phelps Stokes, "that the document may have been composed of transcripts from Verrazzano's original log or journal".)

It was originally written on 8 July 1524 and addressed to a business associate of Gerolamo, Bonacorso Ruscellay. Written in Verrazzano's native Tuscan Italian, that first draft was translated, multiple times, into French for the King. It is unique among the surviving copies in being annotated by Verrazzano himself. (Note: Verrazzano's handwriting has been almost certainly confirmed by comparing it with another manuscript he is known to have addressed to his colleagues, Sartini of Lyon and Ruscellai in Rome. Further circumstantial evidence is provided by the fact that the author of these annotations used the second person plural; not, as Wroth points out, "the royal or editorial pronoun, but in the sense of "we, the ship's company".) These annotations are considerable, and they both expand on the context of the events the Codex describes and provide detailed minutiae about them. It is likely that many other versions of the letter were written for the convenience of the scribe before translating, although they appear not to have survived. The annotated Codex appears to have been given to either Leonardo Tedaldi or Thomaso Sartini, Lyonese merchants, and then forwarded to a Roman banker, Bonacorso Ruscellai, who was a relative of Verrazzano's. Within thirty years it was in the possession of noted Italian antiquarian Paolo Giovi, and eventually resurfaced hundreds of years later in the Cèllere library.

Bacchiani's version was subsequently translated into French in 1933, and again in 1946. The most recent translation was in 1956. The Director of the Morgan Library, Frederick B. Adams, Jr., decided to definitively publish the Library's Codex, complete with transcription, translation, appendices and footnotes. Adams appointed the Library's consultant, Lawrence C. Wroth to undertake the work, and it was eventually published in 1970. Wroth's book utilised and printed the 1956 translation of the Codex.

The reliance historians of the period have sometimes placed upon it—Seymour I. Schwartz, for example, has described it as holding a "nuclear position" in twentieth-century scholarship—has been criticised in some quarters. One modern Italian scholar, Luca Codignola, has blamed this phenomenon on a dearth of contemporary sources other than the Codex, and has condemned what he identifies as a tendency to take the manuscript "at face value", treating it as "a sort of sixteenth-century encyclopaedia".

Scholars were already aware of two other copies of Verrazzano's letter in existence, although the Codex is generally considered the best quality version; (Note: The other two are the MS Ottobonario 22012 in the Vatican Library, and the Codex Magliabechiano, Miscellanea XIII, 89 (3) at the Library of Florence The Florentine recension has been described as a "poor copy of an atrocious text. The Latin manuscript is full of Latinisms and infiltrations of Tuscan; senseless words often appear; some sentences have no beginning and no end; and meanings are frequently lost sight of". From the Florentine MS a fragmentary copy also exists, labelled the Cimento fragment (due to its being held at the Academy of Cimento). The Vatican MS, on the other hand, is in the opposite condition, having been "over-edited and over-polished, with subsequent loss of meaning".) I. N. P. Stokes, as part of his six-volume The Iconography of Manhattan Island, described the Codex as an "accurate and full embodiment of Verrazzano's famous lost letter" to the King. Further, it was "one of the most important documents dealing with the topography of the North-East Coast" of the United States, particularly Manhattan island, which had been up until Verrazzano's arrival undiscovered.

It has been described as the "most significant" and the "definitive document" of Verrazano's voyage on account of its "semi-autobiographic" nature. The Cèllere Codex was written before Verrazano sent his king, Francis I, an official report, but after he had returned from the New World. Verrazzano devoted about one-third of the Codex to the natives he found on the new continent, especially their appearance, customs and society. Other areas of particular interest were the landscape, including climate and vegetation. In its various forms it is the only primary source historians' possess regarding Verrazzano's 1524 navigation of the north-east, and American historian Lawrence C. Wroth called it "the earliest geographical, topological and ethnological survey" stretching from Newfoundland to Florida. Indeed, the degree to which historians have relied on the Codex as informing them evidentially on subjects as diverse as flora, fauna, navigation, vegetation patterns, aboriginal relations, (Note: For instance, Verrazzano relates how they kidnapped young native boy "as a matter of fact occurrence", as children, when they grew up bilingually, could be useful interpreters.) native food ("very wholesome"), and native boats ("a single log" carrying between 10 and 15 men of around 20 feet (6.1 m) to 30 feet (9.1 m) long).

=== Description ===
All considerations, indeed, are consistent with the assumption that this MS is a clerk's copy (or one of several copies) of the letter as Verrazzano wrote it in his native Italian; and it is quite likely the very one to which Verrazzano appended in his own hand important notes to be incorporated in the translation into French for the King-an idea supported by the fact that many of the notes are such as would be of personal complimentary interest to King Francis.

— William Francis Ganong

All three surviving copies of Verrazzano's letter appear to be based upon three separate originals. The Codex was titled A Discourse upon the Indies when it was first transcribed for public consumption by Giovanni Ramusio, the "official cosmographer of the Venetian Republic". It consists of 12 numbered sheets of Italian paper, with text on both sides, measuring 11.375 inches (28.89 cm) x 8.5 inches (22 cm). It is written in the cursive court hand of the period, probably that of a secretary. It is copiously annotated with marginalia—at least 26 times—in a different, more hurried, hand to the prose. This has left ink blots and erasures over the pages. Historian Bernard Hoffman has described what he sees Verrazzano's text as illustrating about him:

The text itself shows that we are dealing with the work of a man of letters. The humanistic culture of the Renaissance is everywhere in evidence, particularly in the cosmographical appendix, in which Verrazzano's empirical philosophy appears with great clarity.

— Bernard J. Hoffman, 1961

Verrazzano's writing in the Codex has been interpreted in different ways. Two recent scholars have praised Verrazzano's prose. John Allen has called Verrazzano's landscape descriptions as "lyric", while Theodore Cachey described him as viewing French territorial expansion "through the lens of the Renaissance...it was an eclectic courtly language and literature". Margaret Eisendrath, on the other hand, has highlighted the author's "detachment" from his subject. (Note: Or, as she puts it, for Verrazzano, "subject-object distance has become a form of interpersonal disconnection in service of domination".) She particularly notices it in his description of their failed kidnapping of a young woman and the successful kidnap of the boy: "what is most striking about this description", she suggests, "is the way it conveys the natives' terror in the same tone as that in which it praises the material richness of the place".

A photographic facsimile of the original document was created and published in 1916 by Phelps Stokes, and this was accompanied by a translation of the Codex by Edward Hagaman Hall. The Cèllere Codex is now held by the Morgan Library and Museum, in Manhattan, as MS MA 776.

=== Voyage description ===
They were surprised that the climate was, in May, 'somewhat' colder than Rome, the latter being on the same parallel — an observation that was to become all too familiar to northern explorers and settlers.

— Luca Codignola

The Codex states at the very beginning how King Francis' instructions were to "discover new lands" and especially a new route to Cathay. It begins by describing Verrazzano's departure from France with four ships, of which two were lost almost immediately in a storm. The remaining two, La Dauphine and Le Normandie had to turn back to Brittany, where, "after a brief period interfering with Spanish shipping" off the coast, the Dauphine sailed alone to Madeira. Verrazzano left—"in great secrecy"—from Porto Santo, in the far-west of the island, on 17 January 1524. (Note: Cordignola points out, that this was "what Europeans had long considered the western end of the Old World".) Somewhere in the Atlantic he encountered a violent storm which raged for sixteen hours. Verrazzano attributed the ship's survival to divine intervention—and its own seaworthiness. He travelled westwards along the 32nd parallel (approximately 150 miles north of Columbus' route) and eventually—sighting "a new land never before seen by anyone"—landed at Cape Fear. The Codex describes how he sailed 160 miles (260 km) south to Florida in search of a harbour. Finding none, he returned to Cape Fear and disembarked, making their first steps upon the new continent. A few days later the Dauphine sailed again, this time north-easterly—always within sight of the coastline—passing North Carolina and Georgia. This area Verrazzano named Selva di Lauri and Campo di Cedri, or the Forest of Laurels and Field of Cedars. (Note: Although it is generally impossible to state exactly where Verrazzano's names now relate to, recent scholarship has noted that "laurel and cedar still grow along the Georgia and South Carolina coasts".) The French next passed Virginia, Maryland, Delaware, New Jersey—"on a sea characterised by enormous waves"—where he recorded seeing Navesink Highlands, which he called "little mountain by the sea". They next came to New York (which he named Nova Gallia, Latin for New France) and Rhode Island coastlands. Here he "temporarily set aside his cautious practice of always dropping anchor off-shore in open waters" and sailed straight into what was probably Narragansett Bay. Here he noted its good defensive position and the potential it possessed for coastal fortifications. (Note: As indeed occurred over 300 years later when the forts by then built at the mouth of Verrazzano's bay played a major role in the Battle of Rhode Island.) He described Staten Island and Brooklyn as "two small but prominent hills...[either side of] a very wide river". The Dauphine then tracked the coast of New England, where in Casco Bay, Maine, they first met natives who were by then experienced in trading with Europeans. (Note: Verrazzano described how, although his party did not actually trade with the natives they encountered in Maine, they gave them "little bells, blue crystals, and other trinkets".) the Codex reveals Verrazzano's disapproval of these natives' bad manners, as he saw it, because they were often "exhibiting their bare behinds and laughing immoderately".

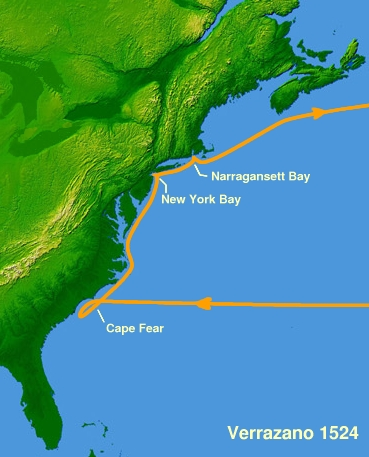
Verrazzano's route in 1524

From there they travelled up to Nova Scotia and Newfoundland (which the Codex calls "Bacalaia"). The Dauphine had returned to Dieppe by early July 1524. However, Codignola notes that although most places can be generally identified, the narrative of the journey "is vague at best", and there are some areas, such as Chesapeake Bay and the Bay of Fundy, which, it has been asserted, he could not have missed, yet go unmentioned altogether. Chesapeake Bay, it has been noted, is 11 miles (18 km) wide but "inexplicably (considering his quest for a passageway through the Americas) he did not enter". (Note: It would, comments Schwartz, be over another 75 years before Chesapeake bay would be discovered and serve as the entry point for the Jamestown colony, in another failed attempt to discover a west-east passage in 1607.) If, however, Verrazzano did indeed miss sighting these places, it may indicate that his attention to the land generally was distracted, possibly by increasingly poor weather conditions; Verrazzano gave "the opposing weather" as a reason for not landing on an island slightly later in the voyage.

Verrazzano navigated the mouth of the Delaware River and named it the "Vandoma"; he did not, Phelps Stokes noted, name the Hudson River, merely describing it as "a very great river". Martha's Vineyard he termed "Aloysia". The Codex is also the only version of Verrazzano's letter to contain a reference to the—"false sea" (imaginary)—Isthmus of Verrazzano, which is unmentioned on any other contemporary maps of his voyage. This is described in the Codex as "an isthmus one mile wide and about two hundred miles long" (and which Verrazano annotates as being so long they could "see the eastern sea from the ship"—i.e., the Pacific Ocean), and which they thought stretched "around the tip of India, China and Cathay". (Note: This has been tentatively identified as being around what it is Cape Lookout today, "with its narrow sand barrier separating the Atlantic ocean from the Pamlico and Albermarle Sounds". This so-called isthmus mislead cartographers and sailors for at least the next 100 years, and has been called "one of the most famous errors in early map-making". It has been suggested that Verrazzano's error stemmed from the distance which he was keeping from the shore, which resulted in his being able to see what appeared to be a ridge with water but no land immediately beyond it.) American academic Thomas Suarez has discussed Verrazzano's reaction to discovering the supposed-isthmus as "bizarre": "after claiming to have unearthed the 'holy grail' of navigators, Verrazzano apparently made no attempt to cross the 'isthmus', either on land or through any of the inlets he reported, inlets which one of his longboats would have had little difficulty maneuvering. Nor does Verrazzano appear to have made an attempt to return to his promising isthmus", particularly as it would have been impossible for him to have not seen the gaps from which fresh water flowed, and which, therefore, could have theoretically provided the passage westwards that he was looking for. Travelling approximately 160 miles (260 km) miles northwards, Verrazzano sent a landing party ashore at around what is now Worcester County, Maryland, or Accomac County, Virginia. Due to what he called the "beauty of the trees"—describing the coast as "very green and forested, but without harbours"—he named the country Arcadia. While ashore, the French kidnapped a native boy. Another 300 miles (480 km) miles north brought the Dauphine to Sandy Hook, New Jersey. They soon came to "a wide river between two prominent hills and took a small boat up-river to a densely populated land. At that point, the river widened to a lake". Verrazzano named one of the peaks "Angoleme" (King Francis' had been Count of Angouleme before ascending to the throne in 1515) and the other he named "Santa Margarita", after the king's sister, Margaret of Valois. He named other headlands after members of the French nobility such as the Duc d'Alençon, seigneur de Bonnivet, the Duc de Vendôme and the Comte de St-Pol. Verrazzano and his crew had discovered New York Harbor. They dropped anchor at what is now called The Narrows, after which event the Verrazano–Narrows Bridge was named. The lake he saw was actually Upper New York Bay, but they did not sail far enough up the river for this to become apparent. He described the many New Yorkers they saw as "dressed in birds' feathers of various colours, and they came toward us joyfully uttering loud cries of wonderment". It is likely that Verrazzano would have stayed longer, but a storm blew up in the harbour and after only a day the Dauphine was forced to retreat further out to sea, at which point Verrazzano decided to continue his navigation northwards: "greatly to our regret", wrote Verrazzano, as the region was, he believed "not without things of value".

"These people", wrote Verrazzano of the Rhode Islanders, "are the most beautiful and have the most civil customs we have found on this voyage. They are taller than we are; they are a bronze colour, some tending towards whiteness, others to a tawny colour; the face is clear-cut, the hair is long and black".

— Robert Knecht

Verrazzano continued to Rhode Island, where they stopped at Newport, and then sailed another 450 miles (720 km) miles, which brought them to Cape Cod. This was a particularly dangerous region for explorers, and Schwartz notes the irony in Verrazzano's naming the area after the "intensely disliked papal official", Francesco Armellini. The final leg of the journey took them to Newfoundland, or what he termed "the land which the Britons once found, which lies in 50 degrees" which took him to Cape Breton and Nova Scotia.

== Aftermath ==
The immediate public response to Verrazzano's return to France in 1525 seems to have been that his voyage had been a failure and that the closest he had come to "mineral booty were the sweet potatoes whose colour, it was hoped, might be regarded as proof of copper deposits". Verrazzano probably intended to return to explore the east coast further, but by the time he returned to France the political situation had changed drastically. French fortunes were falling in the Italian wars, and Francis, already 100 miles (160 km) south of Dieppe, in Blois, was personally travelling there to oversee a renewed campaign. Verrazzano despatched a report from Dieppe. Knecht posits that the King may not have found time to read Verrazano's report, or even to meet the navigator in Lyon (where the King had reached by 7 August). (Note: Indeed, he may not even have received it; Samuel Morison has noted how even the report of Verrazzano's illustrious predecessor, Columbus was not guaranteed to arrive without multiple copies being despatched: "It was sent or presented in person by Columbus to the sovereigns at Barcelona, where it doubtless found its way into the ever-perambulating Royal archives, and so was lost or thrown away before one of the frequent moving days. Fortunately, one or more fair copies were made shortly after the journal was received at Barcelona". Likewise, neither of Hernán Cortés' reports of 1519 or 1526 to Emperor Charles V have survived, yet their contents is known because copies were made soon after receipt. Wroth also notes other factors that may have diminished Francis immediate interest in Verrazzano's: on top of the royal household's rapid movement and military preparations, Francis' wife, Queen Claude, died in Blois on 27 July.)

My intention on this voyage was to reach Cathay and the extreme eastern coast of Asia, but I did not expect to find such an obstacle of new land as I have found; and if for some reason I did expect to find it, I estimated there would be some strait to get through to the Eastern Ocean

— Giovanni da Verrazzano, Cèllere Codex, c.1524

Although the King had left Verrazzano a commission to fit out a new expedition (of four ships), no sooner had this been completed then the ships were requisitioned for Francis' war effort. Verrazzano may have attempted to find another patron in either the King of England, or Portugal In the event, he formed a partnership with Admiral Chabot and Jean Ango to travel to the Spice Islands via the Cape of Good Hope, but although his fleet of three ships left France in 1527, the weather was sufficiently poor to force Verrazzano to return to France by that September. He was subsequently instructed by Chabot to seek out "a great river on the coast of Brazil" in another attempt at seeking a passage to the Pacific. This voyage was to be Verrazzano's last; he was killed and eaten somewhere in the Caribbean, and his ships returned to France without him.

== Historical significance ==
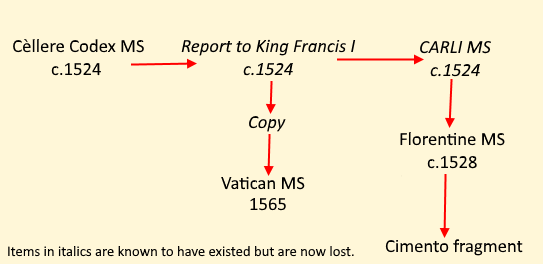
B. J. Hoffman's stemma of Verrazanno texts

Verrazzano was the first and only European navigator to "systematically"—and intentionally—explore the east coast of the New World. The most important aspect of the voyage Verrazzano described in the Codex, to contemporaries, was that he had disproved the knowledge handed down by the ancients, who had taught that the Atlantic touched both Europe and Asia with nothing in between. He did not do this deliberately; Wroth points out that Verrazzano's "credulity of an open passage to Asia grew out of inherited confidence" in early writers, "particularly Aristotle". (Note: By the time Verrazzano sailed, the theory of a joined east-west ocean was well-established. It is illustrated in Henricus Martellus' world map, as well as in various copper globes produced in the late fifteenth century, such as the Parisian Gilt Globe of around 1528. This is a gilded copper globe, and not only draws upon the discoveries of Ferdinand Magellan, but also illustrates the location of Verrazzano's Terra francesca nuper lustrata—"the Land of Francis lately explored".) Verrazzano himself was persuaded otherwise, and reported that the "New World which above I have described is connected together, not adjoining Asia or Africa (which I know to be a certainty)". The Codex is, Verrazzano continued, "the most accurate and the most valuable of all the early coastal voyages that has come down to us". It also led to the creation of what would be the definitive map of the world, Gerolamo's map of 1529 and the Lok Map of 1582. Robertus de Bailly used Gerolamo's map as the basis for his 1530 globe, and all of them included Verrazzano's imaginary isthmus. Verrazzano's voyage, with all its descriptive and cartographical errors, was still important for both explorers and mapmakers, as it effectively filled in a gap between what the Spanish had discovered in the south and what the English had towards Canada. The Codex report, after it was disseminated through the navigational and cartographic communities, "bolstered the growing conviction among the best English and French geographers that North America was a separate continent", and that a solid land mass connected La Florida of the Spanish to Newfoundland in the north. Verrazzano also provided the provenance and justification for French activities in the Americas: until the end of the century, French diplomacy defended the various actions of French sailors—whether corsairs or fishermen—with reference to the 1524 voyage.

Until the Codex was discovered, nineteenth-century historians had no proof that Verrazzano had ever made his voyage in 1524, as no other record of it was found to exist in either French or Italian archives. Until then, there was some doubt among scholars as to whether his voyage had taken place at all. The nineteenth-century antiquarian Buckingham Smith denounced the entire voyage as "a fabrication", and H. C. Murphy "plausibly argued" that not only had Verrazzano never reached America but that the letter of 8 July 1524 was not even his. They believed, instead, that Verrazzano was instead a corsair named Jean Florin ("the Florentine"). This historiographical dispute was known as the "Verrazzano controversy". It was considered at least possible that Verrazzano's letter was a fraud and one which had had the active participation of King Francis. Francis' intention, it was suggested, was to allow him to lay claim to the country without the need to fund an expensive exploration. The American Antiquarian Society, for example, stated at their 1876 AGM that "the time seems not yet to have arrived when this society should attempt a judicial decision upon the claims made in behalf of John Verrazzano to the distinction of being the discoverer of a large portion of the North American coast". In response, The Nation wrote the same year that the controversy could not be over, because there were still "archives to search, documents to compare, statements to verify or impugn", and that suggestions that Verrazzano had not made the voyages as claimed were based solely on assumptions by his critics. The French cartographic scholar Marcel Destombes noted that in the light of modern scholarship, the criticisms of Smith and Murphy—"whose books nobody now reads"—have been discounted and the Codex is seen as just latest and best piece of evidence for Verrazzano's 1524 navigation, for which the evidence was already firm.
