= Jean Fleury =

French naval officer and privateer

Jean Florin
- Born: Normandy, France
- Died: 1527; Toledo, Spain
- Piratical career
- Type: Corsair
- Allegiance: France
- Years active: c. 1521–1527
- Rank: Captain
- Base of operations: Normandy

Jean Fleury (or Florin) (died 1527) was a French naval officer and privateer. He is best known for the capture of two out of the three Spanish galleons carrying the Aztec treasure of Hernán Cortés from Mexico to Spain and one ship from Santo Domingo in 1522. This was one of the earliest recorded acts of piracy against the new Spanish Empire and encouraged the French Corsairs, Dutch Sea Beggars and English Sea Dogs to begin attacking shipping and settlements in the Spanish Main during the next several decades.

== Biography ==
A French corsair and naval officer from Dieppe in Normandy, Fleury served as a pilot under Jean Ango and commanded a small squadron during the Four Years' War. He was involved in longrange naval warfare, operating as far as 2,000 kilometres from his base with only a few hundred men, and was an active privateer during the conflict. In early 1522, three Spanish ships were sighted off the southwest coast of Portugal, somewhere between the Azores and Cape St. Vincent, and Florin ordered his five-ship squadron to attack. The small Spanish fleet, under Captain Quiñones and Alonso de Ávila, was on the last leg of their journey from Havana, Cuba to Seville, Spain carrying a large gold shipment taken from Hernán Cortés's recent conquest of Mexico and was to be presented as a tribute to Charles V. It is unknown whether Florin was aware of the Spaniard's cargo, however he decided to give chase and overtook them within a few hours.

During the same voyage, Fleury assaulted another ship from Santo Domingo which increased the loot to 20,000 gold pesos, pearls, sugar and cowhides.

Although the Spanish responded to the raid by fortifying nearly all their major ports and cities in the Caribbean, it was only a matter of time before the rest of Europe became aware of the treasure Spain was bringing back from the New World. Besides the gold bullion, among the treasures captured by Florin included exotic animals, enameled gold and jade, ornaments, emeralds, pearls, works of art, masks in mosaic of fine stones and other rare items which were presented to Francis I.

The following year, he and Jean Terrian set out on another expedition against Spain with a fleet of eight ships capturing over 30 Portuguese and Spanish vessels by the end of the year. Fleury was eventually captured by the Spanish and, held captive for a time, was tried in Toledo along with two of his officers, Michel Fere and Mezie de Irizar, and hanged as a pirate in 1527 by Charles V.

After the loss of this treasure, all the ships that traveled from America to Europe did so under escort, originating the system known as the Spanish treasure fleet, which would become habitual in the following decades and centuries.
