= Giovanni da Verrazzano =

Florentine explorer of North America for France (1485–1528)

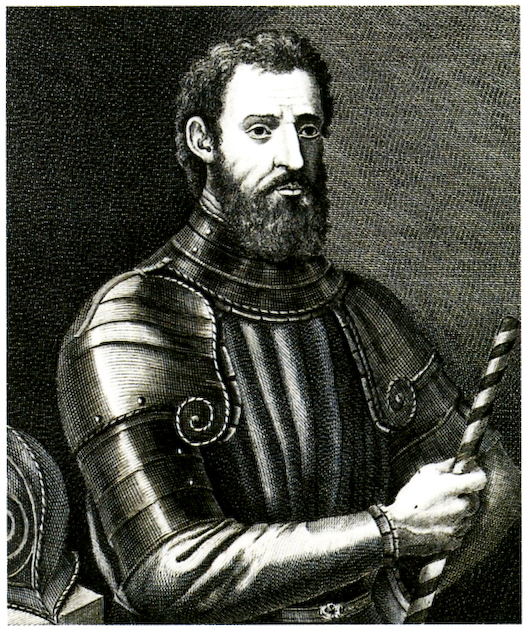
- Engraving by F. Allegrini (1768)
- Born: 1491; Val di Greve, Republic of Florence
- Died: 1528 (aged 36–37); Unclear; possibly Guadeloupe (uncolonized)
- Other names: Janus Verrazanus; Jehan de Verrazane
- Occupation: Explorer
- Parents: Frosino da Verrazzano (father); Lisabetta Daffi (mother)

Signature
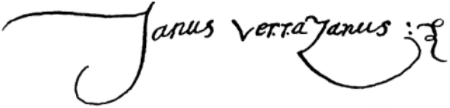

Giovanni da Verrazzano (/ˌvɛrəˈzɑːnoʊ, -ətˈsɑː-/ VERR-ə-ZAH-noh, -ət-SAH-, Italian: [dʒoˈvanni da (v)verratˈtsaːno]; often misspelled Verrazano in English; 1491–1528) was an Italian explorer from the Republic of Florence, best known for his expedition to North America. He led most of his later missions, including the one to America, in the service of King Francis I of France.

He is renowned as the first European to explore the Atlantic coast of North America between Florida and New Brunswick in 1524, including New York Bay and Narragansett Bay.

== Early life ==
Verrazzano was born in Val di Greve (now Greve in Chianti), south of Florence, the capital and main city of the Republic of Florence. Recent archival research indicates he was born on July 20, 1491 to Frosino di Lodovico di Cece da Verrazzano and Lisabetta di Leonardo Daffi. An older hypothesis identified him with a son born in 1485 to Piero Andrea di Bernardo da Verrazzano and Fiammetta Cappelli.

Other theories, now obsolete, postulated that Verrazzano was born in Lyon, France, the son of Alessandro di Bartolommeo da Verrazano and Giovanna Guadagni. As Ronald S. Love stated, "Verrazzano always considered himself to be Florentine," and he was considered a Florentine by his contemporaries as well.

He signed documents employing a Latin version of his name, "Janus Verrazanus", (Note: The Christian name is considered nonstandard, being of another name. The typical Latinization of "John" is "'Jo(h)annes".) and he called himself "Jehan de Verrazane" in his will dated 11 May 1526 in Rouen, France (preserved at the Archives départementales de la Seine-Maritime).

In contrast to his detailed account of his voyages to North America, little is definitively known about his personal life. After 1506, he settled in the port of Dieppe, Kingdom of France, where he began his career as a navigator.

He embarked for the American coast probably in 1508 in the company of captain Thomas Aubert, on the ship La Pensée, equipped by the owner, Jean Ango. He explored the region of Newfoundland, possibly during a fishing trip, and possibly the St. Lawrence River in Canada; on other occasions, he made numerous voyages to the eastern Mediterranean.

== 1522–24 voyage to North America ==
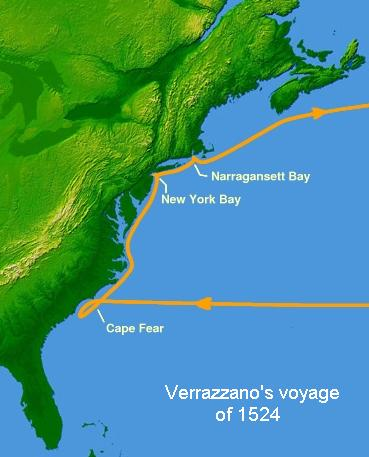
Verrazzano's voyage in 1524

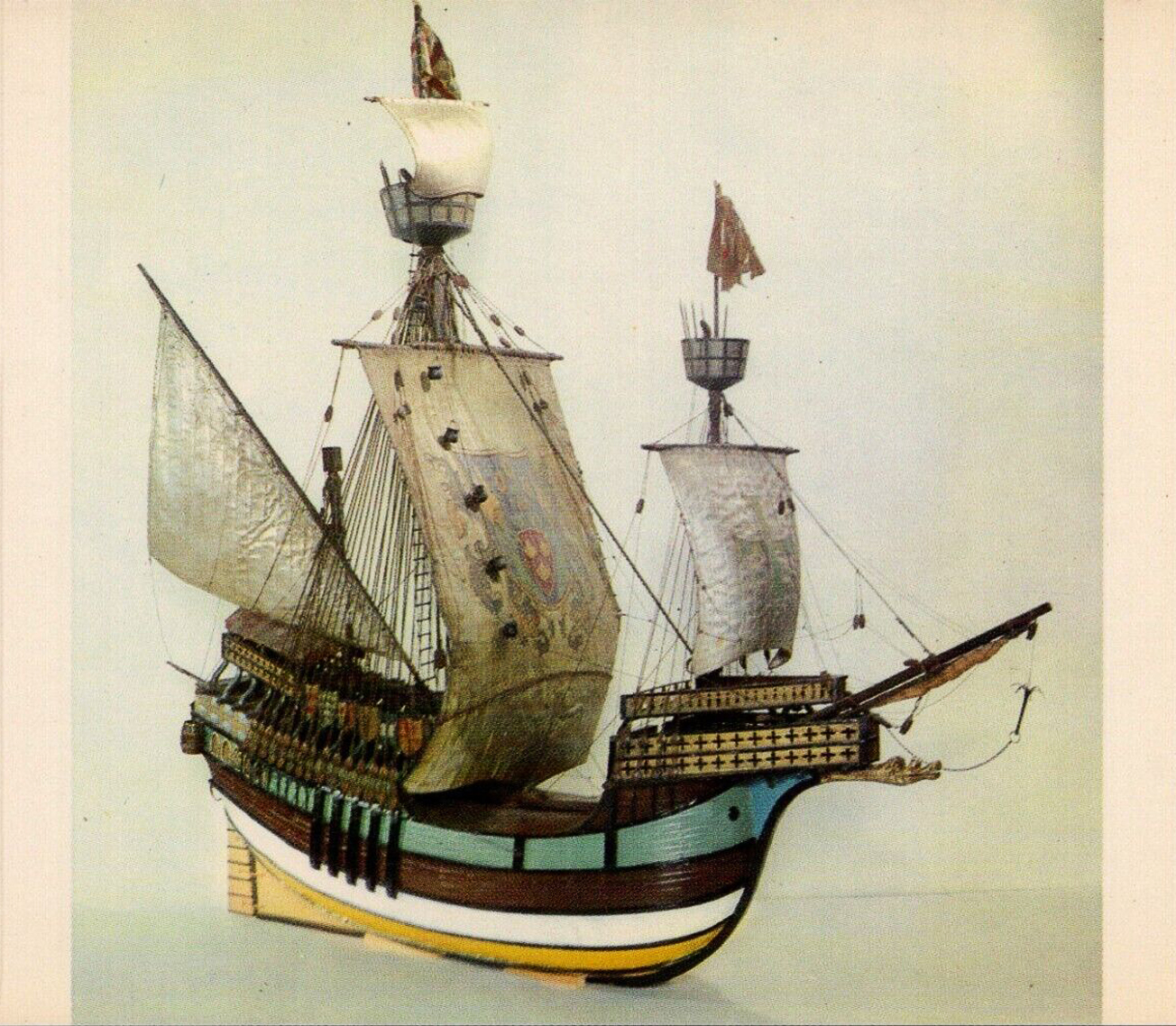
La Dauphine (model) sailed by Verrazzano in 1524

In September 1522, the surviving members of the Magellan expedition returned to Spain, having circumnavigated the globe. Competition in trade was becoming urgent, especially with Portugal.

French merchants and financiers urged King Francis I of France to establish new trade routes. In 1523, the king asked Verrazzano to explore on France's behalf an area between Florida and Newfoundland, intending to find a sea route to the Pacific Ocean. The expedition was funded by a consortium of Florentine merchants based in Lyon and Rouen, including the Gondi, Rucellai, Nasi, and Albizzi families. Over 20,000 écus were raised, with Verrazzano himself contributing as both captain and investor.

Within months, four ships set sail due west for the Grand Banks of Newfoundland, but a violent storm and rough seas caused the loss of two ships. The remaining two damaged ships, La Dauphine and La Normande, were forced to return to Brittany.

Repairs were completed in the final weeks of 1523, and the ships set sail again. This time, the ships headed south toward calmer waters under hostile Spanish and Portuguese control.

After a stop in Madeira, complications forced La Normande back to home port, but Verrazzano's ship La Dauphine departed on January 17, 1524, piloted by Antoine de Conflans, and headed once more for the North American continent.

It neared the area of Cape Fear on March 21, 1524 and, after a short stay, reached the Pamlico Sound lagoon of modern North Carolina. In a letter to Francis I, described by historians as the Cèllere Codex, Verrazzano wrote that he was convinced that the Sound was the beginning of the Pacific Ocean from which access could be gained to China.

Continuing to explore the coast further northwards, Verrazzano and his crew came into contact with Native Americans living on the coast. However, he did not notice the entrances to the Chesapeake Bay or the mouth of the Delaware River.

In New York Bay, he encountered the Lenape in about 30 Lenape canoes and observed what he deemed to be a large lake, really the entrance to the Hudson River. He then sailed along Long Island and entered Narragansett Bay, where he received a delegation of Wampanoag and Narragansett people.

The words "Norman villa" are found on the 1527 map by Visconte Maggiolo identifying the site. The historian Samuel Eliot Morison writes that "this occurs at Angouleme (New York) rather than Refugio (Newport). It was probably intended to compliment one of Verrazzano's noble friends. There are several places called 'Normanville' in Normandy, France. The main one is located near Fécamp and another important one near Évreux, which would naturally be it. West of it, conjecturally on the Delaware or New Jersey coast, is a Longa Villa, which Verrazzano certainly named after François d'Orléans, duc de Longueville." He stayed there for two weeks and then moved northwards.

He discovered Cape Cod Bay, his claim being proved by a map of 1529 that clearly outlined Cape Cod. He named the cape after a general, calling it Pallavicino. He then followed the coast up to modern Maine, southeastern Nova Scotia, and Newfoundland, and he then returned to France by 8 July 1524. Verrazzano named the region that he explored Francesca in honour of the French king, but his brother's map labelled it Nova Gallia (New France).

== Later life and death ==
Coat of arms of Giovanni da Verrazzano

Verrazzano arranged a second voyage, with financial support from Jean Ango and Philippe de Chabot, which departed from Dieppe with four ships early in 1527. One ship was separated from the others in a gale near the Cape Verde Islands. Still, Verrazzano reached the coast of Brazil with two ships and harvested a cargo of brazilwood before returning to Dieppe in September. The third ship returned later, also with a cargo of brazilwood.

The partial success did not find the desired passage to the Pacific Ocean, but it inspired Verrazzano's final voyage, which left Dieppe in early 1528.

There are conflicting accounts of Verrazzano's demise. In one version, during his third voyage to North America in 1528, after he had explored Florida, the Bahamas, and the Lesser Antilles, Verrazzano anchored out to sea and rowed ashore, probably on the island of Guadeloupe. He was allegedly killed and eaten by the native Caribs. The fleet of two or three ships was anchored out of gunshot range, and no one could respond in time.

Some earlier historians hypothesized that Verrazzano was the same person as the corsair Jean Fleury, who was executed for piracy by the Spanish. This theory has been definitively rejected by historians, notably Prospero Peragallo, who demonstrated that the two were distinct individuals. After evaluating the evidence for the various versions of Verrazzano's death, Lawrence C. Wroth concluded that his cannibalization by Caribs may well be true, while the hypothesis that he was hanged as Fleury is highly implausible.

== Legacy ==
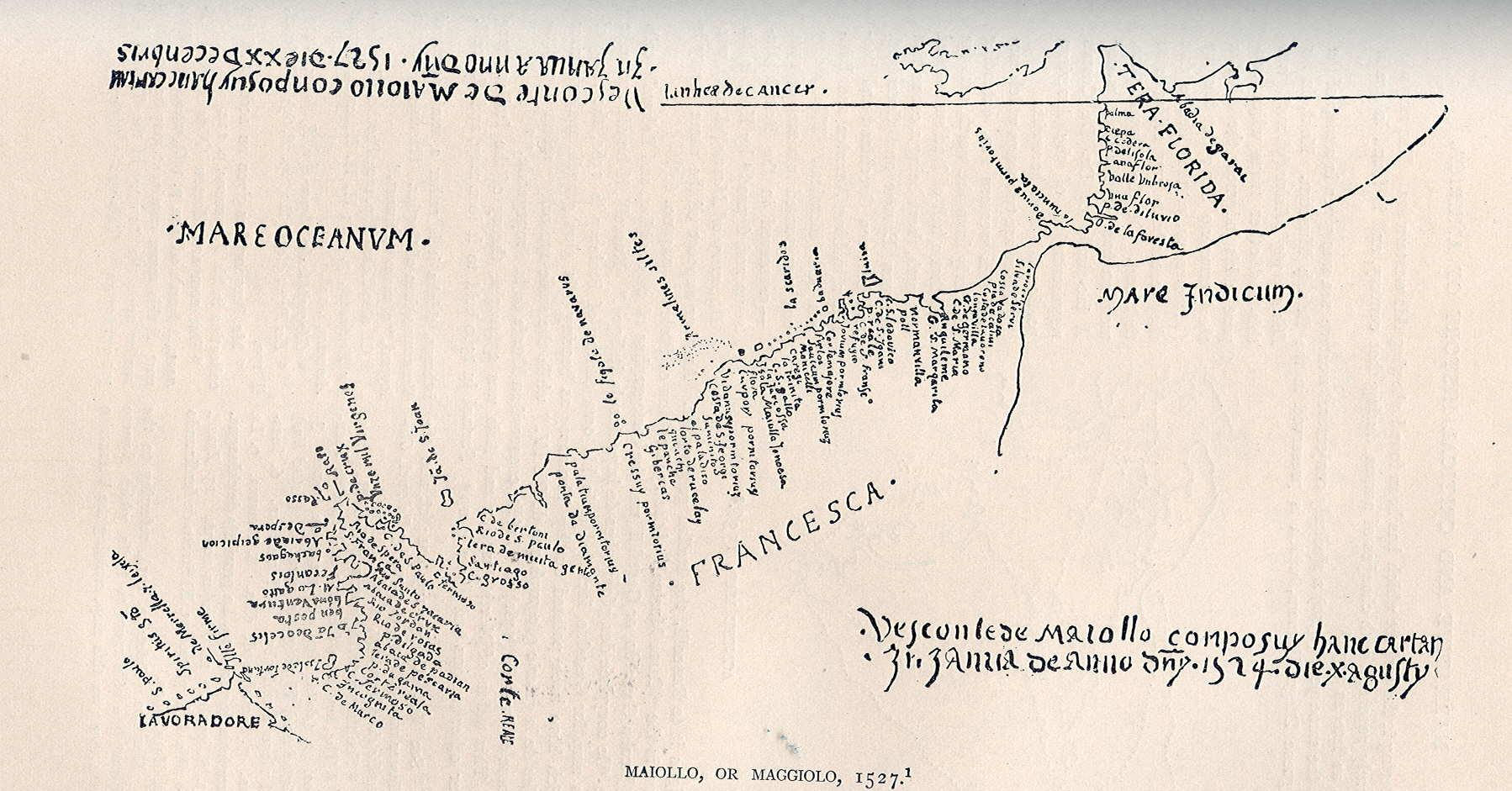
1527 map by Visconte Maggiolo showing the east coast of North America with "Tera Florida" at top right and "Lavoradore" (Labrador) at bottom left. The information supposedly came from Giovanni da Verrazzano's voyage in 1524. (Biblioteca Ambrosiana Milan.)

The geographic information derived from this voyage significantly influenced sixteenth-century cartographers. Despite his discoveries, Verrazzano's reputation did not proliferate as much as other explorers of that era. For example, Verrazzano gave the European name Francesca to the new land that he had seen, in accordance with contemporary practices, after the French king in whose name he sailed. That and other names he bestowed on features he discovered have not survived. He had the misfortune of making significant discoveries shortly after the years (1519 to 1521) that the dramatic Conquest of the Aztec Empire and the first circumnavigation of the world occurred.

In the 19th and early 20th centuries, there was a great debate in the United States about the authenticity of the letters that Verrazzano ostensibly wrote to Francis I to describe the geography, flora, fauna, and native population of the east coast of North America. Others thought that they were authentic, in particular since the discovery of the Cèllere Codex in 1909. This is the most widely held opinion nowadays, particularly after the discovery of a letter signed by Francis I, which referred to Verrazzano's letter.

Verrazzano's reputation was particularly obscure in New York City, where the 1609 voyage of Henry Hudson on behalf of the Dutch Republic came to be regarded as the de facto start of European exploration of New York (Estêvão Gomes's trip of 1524 was likewise forgotten). It was only by a great effort by the Italian-American community in 1909 and then in the 1940s and 1950s that Verrazzano's name and reputation were established as the European discoverer of the harbour, culminating in an initiative to name the newly built Narrows Bridge after him.

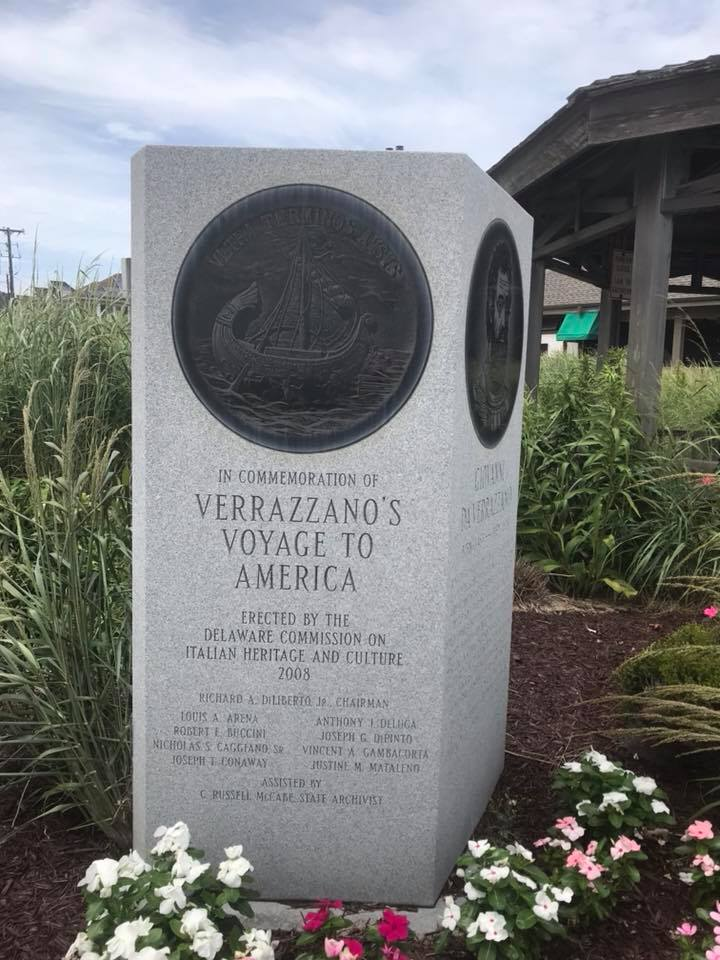
South face of Verrazzano's monument in Rehoboth Beach, Delaware

=== Commemorations ===
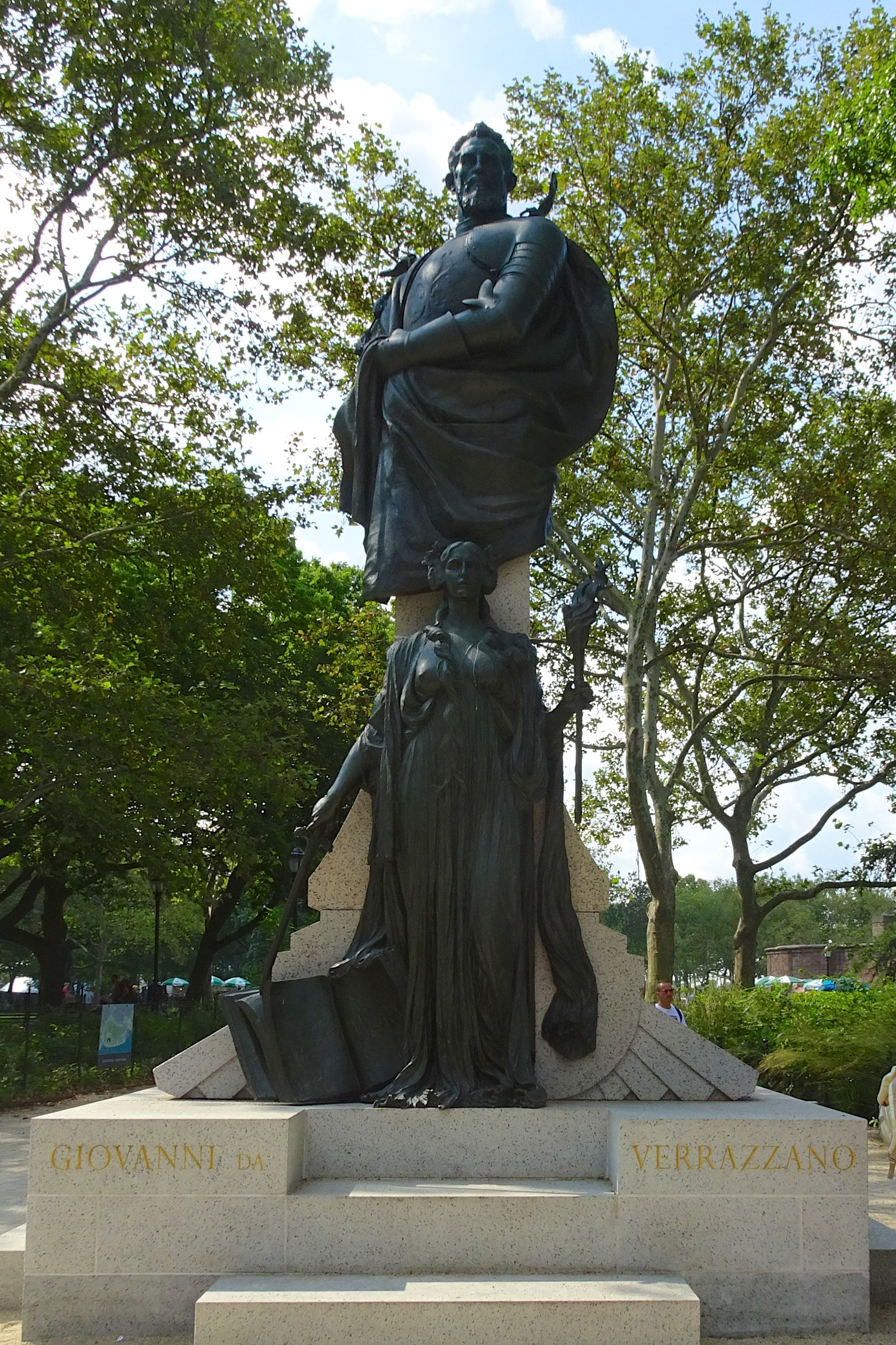
Statue in Battery Park, Manhattan by Ettore Ximenes (1909)

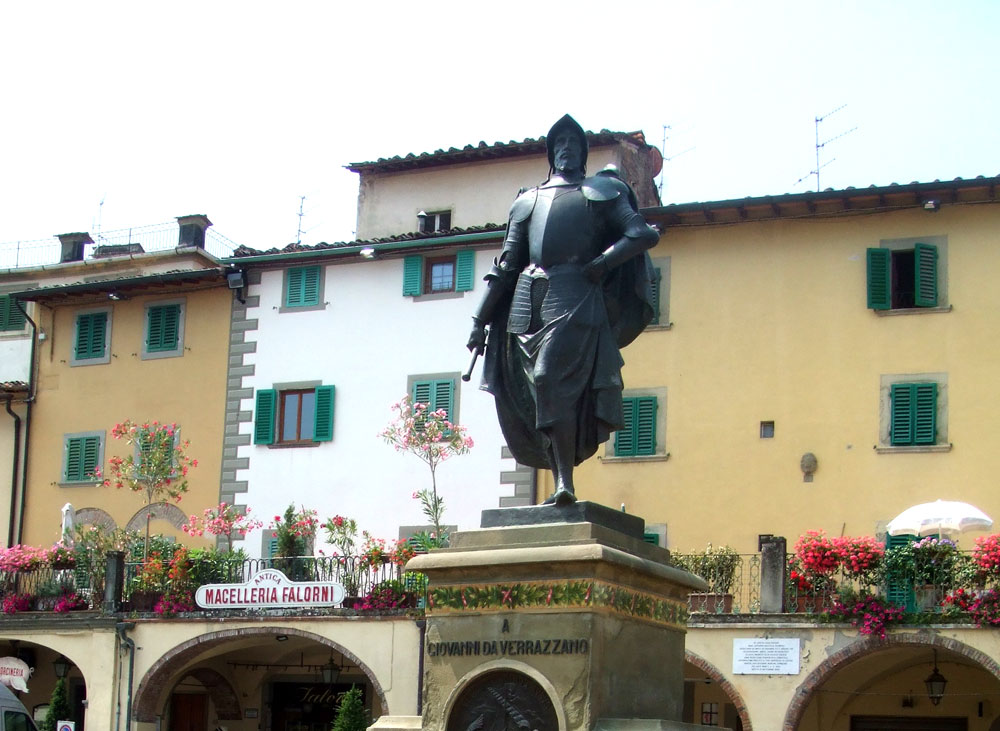
Verrazzano's statue in the town of Greve in Chianti, Italy

- In 1909, during the Hudson-Fulton Celebration, a bronze statue of Verrazzano by Ettore Ximenes was installed in Battery Park in Manhattan.
- There are numerous commemorations of the explorer on Staten Island.
  - The Verrazzano–Narrows Bridge, spanning The Narrows that separate Staten Island from Brooklyn, is perhaps the best known. Until October 2018, it was known as the "Verrazano–Narrows Bridge" with one "z".
  - A Staten Island Ferry boat that served New York from the 1950s to the 1990s was also named for Verrazzano. The ferry was named the "Verrazzano", while the bridge was named "Verrazano".
  - A Little League team on Staten Island is also named for him.
- The Jamestown Verrazzano Bridge in Narragansett Bay, Rhode Island, is named for him, as is Maryland's Verrazano Bridge.
- A vessel of the Regia Marina, a destroyer of the Navigatori class, was named after Verrazzano. She was launched in 1930 and sunk by a British submarine in 1942.
- There is a statue of him in the town of Greve in Chianti, Italy.
- There is a monument commemorating him in Rehoboth Beach, Delaware; it states on its south face:

In Commemoration of
Verrazzano's
Voyage to
America
erected by the
Delaware Commission on
Italian Heritage and Culture
2008

The monument further states on its east face:

A native of Val Di Greve in the Tuscany region of Italy, he studied navigation as a young man and became a master mariner. He was engaged by the King of France to lead a voyage to North America in 1524. The purpose of Verrazzano's journey was to learn more about the continent. Traveling in a small ship known as the Dauphine, he explored coastal areas from the present-day State of North Carolina to Canada, observing the natural abundance of the land and the vibrant culture of its native peoples. His voyage is the earliest documented European exploration of this part of the Atlantic Coast.

This monument rests upon stone from Castello di Verrazzano, the explorer's ancestral home.
