= French corsairs =

French privateers authorized by the French crown

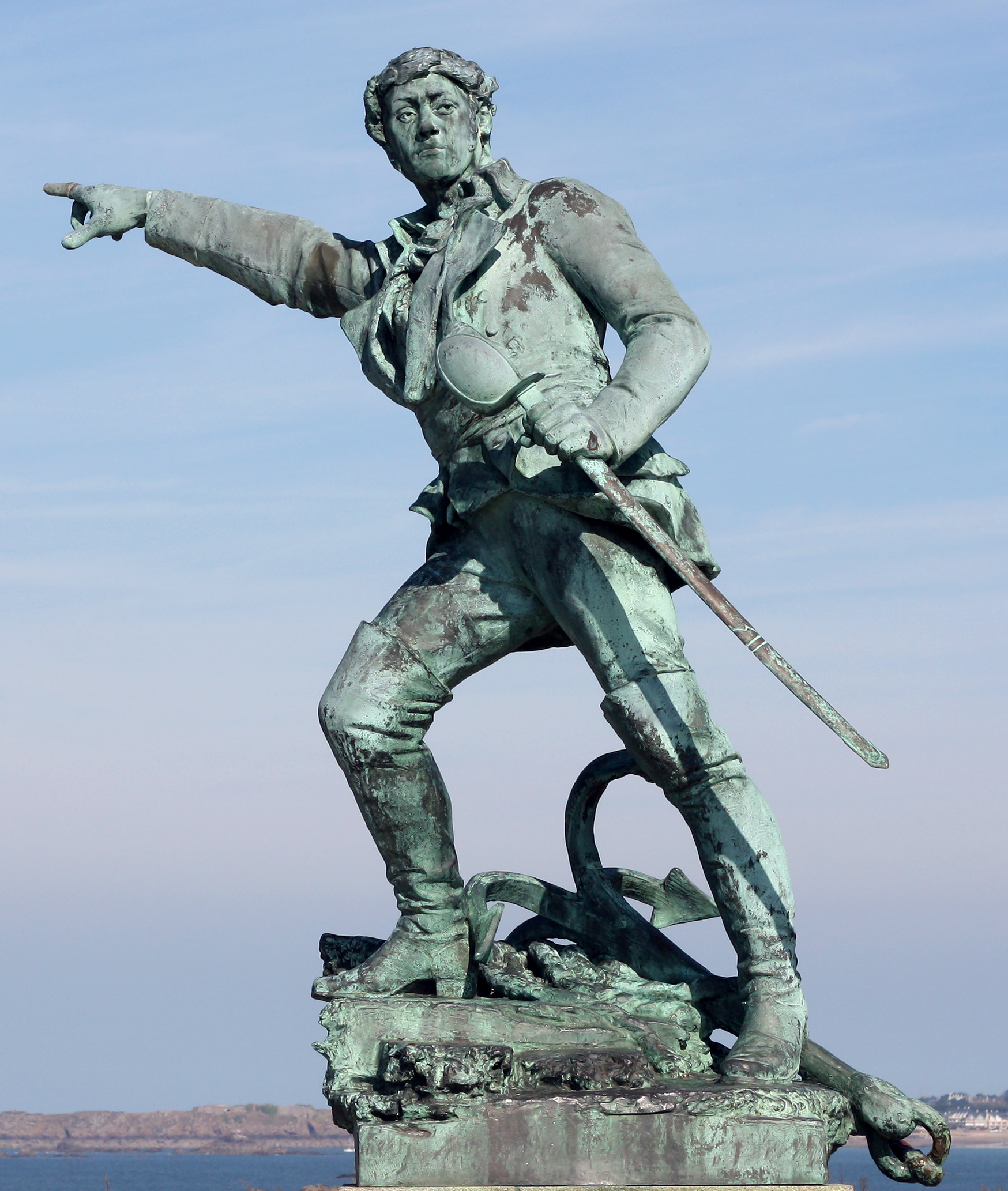
A statue of French corsair Robert Surcouf in Saint-Malo, Brittany

Corsairs (French: corsaire) were privateers, authorised to conduct raids on shipping of a foreign state at war with the Kingdom of France, on behalf of the French crown. Seized vessels and cargo were sold at auction, with the corsair captain entitled to a portion of the proceeds. Although not French Navy personnel, corsairs were considered legitimate combatants in France (and allied nations), provided the commanding officer of the vessel was in possession of a valid letter of marque (lettre de marque or lettre de course, the latter giving corsairs their name), and the officers and crew conducted themselves according to contemporary admiralty law. By acting on behalf of the French Crown, if captured by the enemy, they could in principle claim treatment as prisoners of war, instead of being considered pirates.

Because corsairs gained a swashbuckling reputation, the word "corsair" is also used generically as a more romantic or flamboyant way of referring to privateers, or even to pirates. The Barbary pirates of North Africa as well as the Ottoman Empire were sometimes called "Turkish corsairs".

== Etymology ==
The word "corsair" comes directly from the French phrase lettre de course, the word corsaire borrowed from the Italian corsaro. This derives from the Latin cursus, meaning "course" (as in journey or expedition). The French word corsaire may have originated as a mispronunciation of the Arabic word قُرْصَان qurṣān; the term pirate had been in use in French since the Middle Ages. However, Sayyid Sulaimān Nadvī, an Indian Muslim scholar of Islamic studies, says that "Qarsan ... [may be] the arabicised form of 'Corsair'."

== History ==
French corsairs were privateers who had been issued letters of marque by the Kingdom of France to attack the ships of France's enemies. In France they did not need to fear punishment for piracy—being hanged—as they were granted a licence as combatants, the lettre de marque or lettre de course, a document which legitimised their actions to the French justice system and which they hoped gave them the status of a war prisoner in case they were ever captured. The corsair was ordered to attack only the ships of enemy countries, theoretically respecting those of neutral nations and his own nations. If he did not respect this rule, he was then treated as a pirate and hanged. The corsairs' activities also provided the King with revenue as the licence required them to hand over a part of their booty to the King. In common with privateers of other nationalities, however, they were often considered pirates by their foreign opponents, and might be hanged as pirates if captured by the foreigners they preyed on.

The "corsair" activities started in the Middle Ages, primarily in order to ameliorate economic problems faced by ship owners unwilling to accept war as an obstacle to their trade. Jean de Châtillon, who was a bishop, in 1144 gave the town of Saint-Malo the status of rights of asylum which encouraged all manner of thieves and rogues to move there. Their motto was "Neither Breton, nor French, but from Saint-Malo am I!". Saint-Malo, however, progressed and in 1308 the town was made into a free commune to encourage the commercial activities of craftsmen as well as merchants and ship owners. This did not really work out and later in 1395 the town became a free port. This situation continued until 1688.

Between the early 1500s and 1713, when the signing of the Peace of Utrecht effectively put an end to the French corsair raids in the Caribbean, the guerre de course, as the French called it, took a huge toll on the Spanish treasure fleet's efforts to ship the gold and silver from Peru to Santo Domingo and Havana and then on to Spain. During this period, there was an intense drive to improve, not only the speed of the ships involved in this contest, but also their manoeuvrability and ability to sail into the wind (the close haul). It was a matter of life or death, and immense wealth was at stake. Jean d'Ango, father and son, came to be among the wealthiest and most influential men in France. In addition to those listed below, Giovanni da Verrazzano (namesake of the Verrazano-Narrows Bridge) and Jean Fleury were among the principals in this era. The 1517 travel journal of Antonio de Beatis described the ship of Fra Bernardino, known as the "Great Corsair" (operating against Turkish vessels) in Marseille: "His galleon is massively timbered, new and extremely well-fitted out, especially in point of artillery, carrying as it does twelve cannon, twelve falconets and a hundred arquebuses."

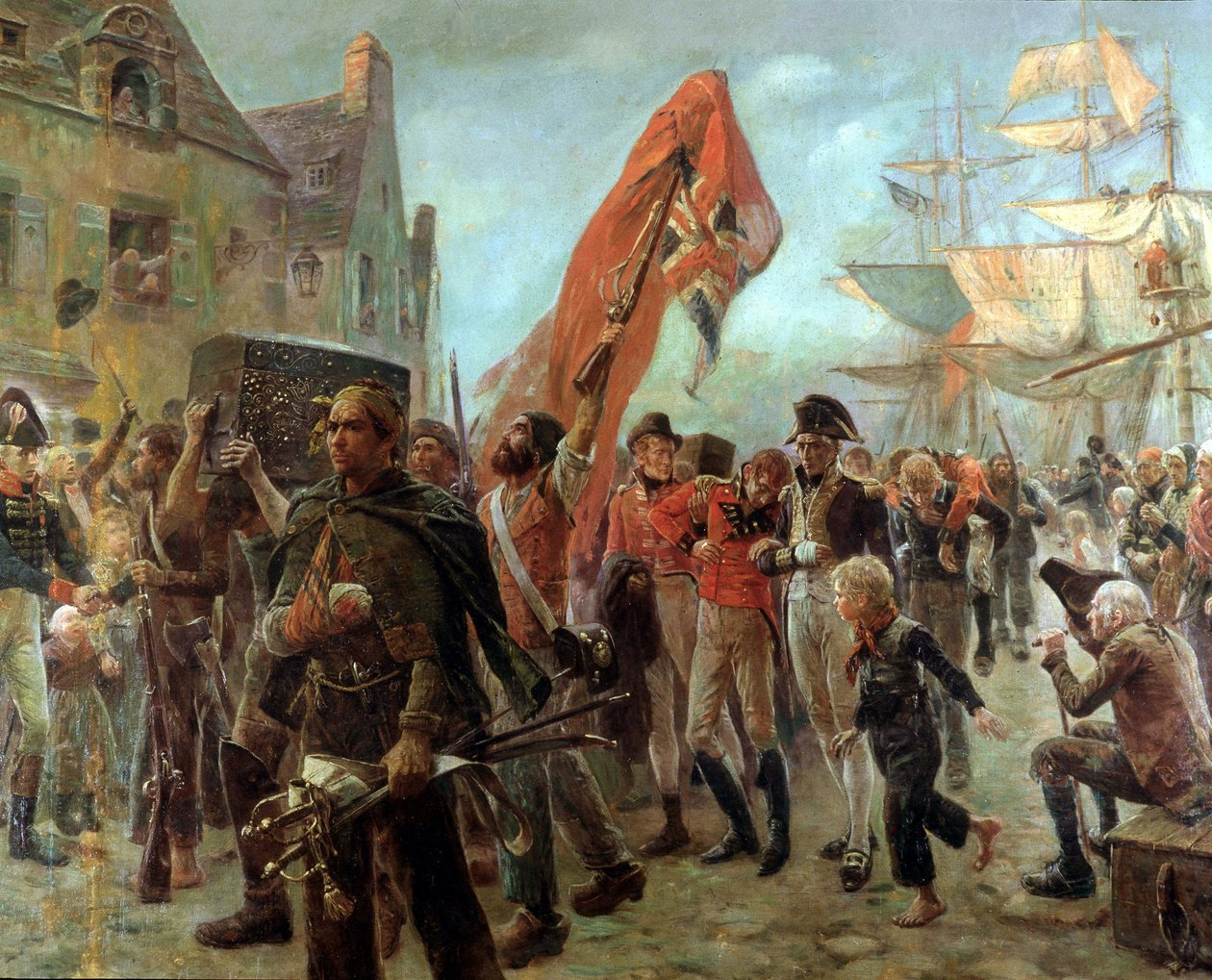
Painting of French corsairs returning to port after capturing a British warship in 1806

The activities of the corsairs were so profitable that the Minister of the Navy used this in his strategy to make money. Moreover, the King used to take one-quarter or even one-third of the booty. The corsairs' activities weakened France's enemies; indeed, English trade losses were very important from 1688 to 1717. In a note based on an examination of Lloyd's List from 1793 to 1800, the anonymous author showed that British shipping losses to captures exceeded those resulting from the perils of the sea.

Losses to capture: 4314; recaptured 705; Net – 3639
Perils of the sea: 2385 plus 652 driven on shore, of which 70 recovered; Net – 2967.

The relationship between the corsairs and the State changed as the power of the State grew. The rules became stricter and State control more and more present. At the end of the 18th century, the "course" started to decline until its legal death in 1856. The "course" disappeared in France with the Empire in 1804, but was officially ended only by the 1814 Treaty of Paris, where every major northern hemisphere nation except Spain, Mexico, and the United States, was present, and the 1815 Congress of Vienna.

== Famous corsairs ==
=== Jean Bart ===
Jean Bart (21 October 1650 – 27 April 1702) was a French naval commander and privateer. He achieved his greatest successes during the Nine Years' War (1688–1697) serving under Admiral Michiel de Ruyter, participating in the Battle of Texel and the Battle of Dogger Bank.

=== René Duguay-Trouin ===
René Duguay-Trouin was born in Saint-Malo in 1673, and the son of a rich ship owner took a fleet of 64 ships and was honoured in 1709 for capturing more than 300 merchant ships and 20 warships. He had a brilliant privateering and naval career and eventually became "Lieutenant-General of the Naval Armies of the King", i.e., admiral, (French:Lieutenant-Général des armées navales du roi), and a Commander in the Order of Saint-Louis. He died peacefully in 1736.

=== Robert Surcouf ===
Robert Surcouf was the last and best-known corsair of the Saint-Malo. Born there in 1773, his father was a ship owner and his mother the daughter of a captain. Ship's boy at 13 and corsair captain at 22 years old, and then—very much against his licence—for several years attacked ships including those of the French East India Company, or Compagnie Française des Indes. During the French Revolution, the convention government disapproved of lettres de course, so Surcouf operated at great personal risk as a pirate against British shipping to India. Surcouf was so successful that he became a popular celebrity in France. After a brief early retirement Surcouf again operated against shipping to the Indies. Surcouf became a ship owner himself and died in Saint-Malo in 1827. There is a statue of him on public display there, and his house is now a small museum.

=== François Aregnaudeau ===
François Aregnaudeau (1774 – c.1813), was a Breton who commanded a number of privateers, most notably Blonde, and Duc de Dantzig. In them he captured numerous prizes. He and Duc de Dantzig disappeared without a trace around the end of 1812. Their disappearance gave rise to an unsubstantiated gruesome ghost ship legend.

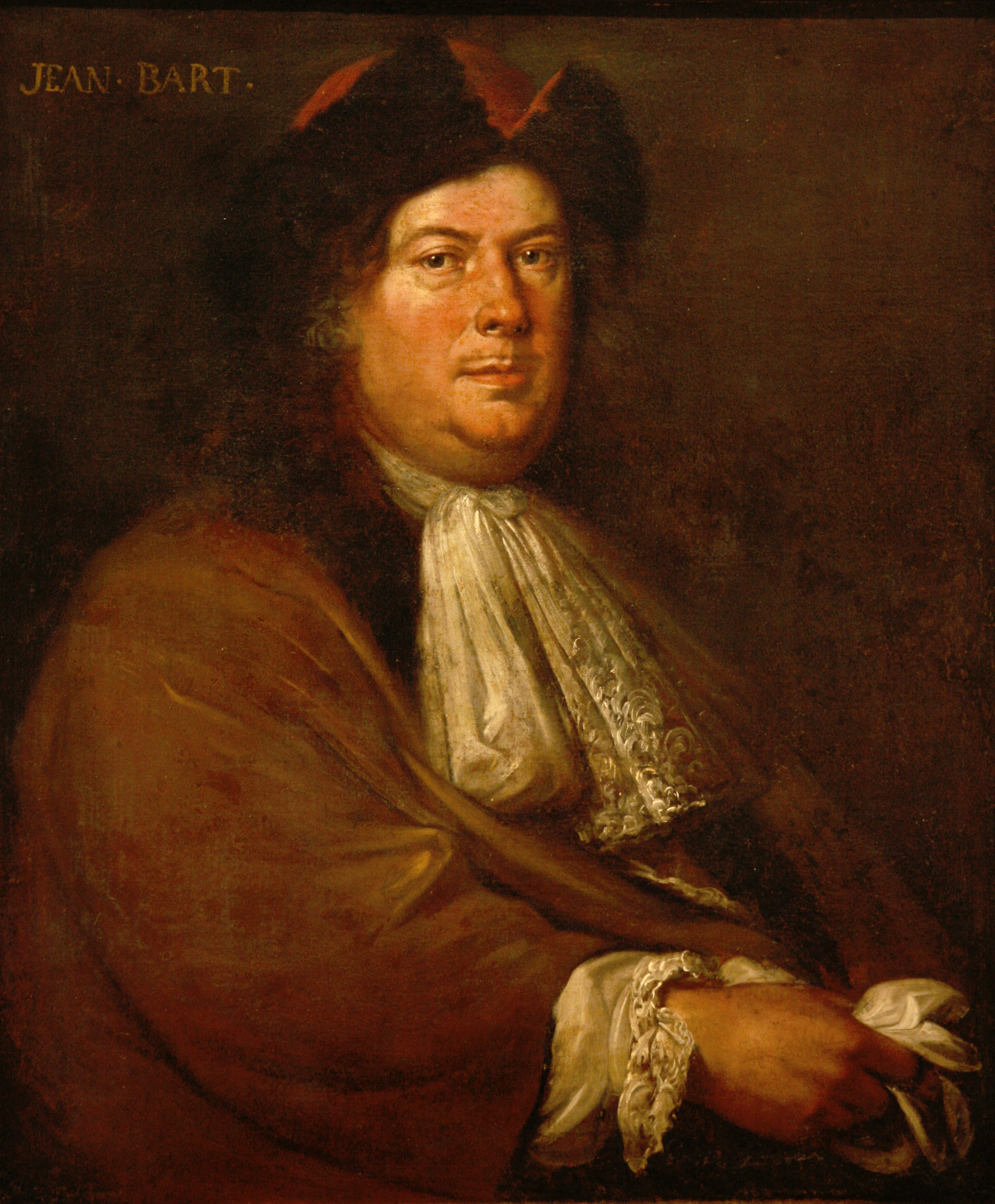
Jean Bart (1650–1702)

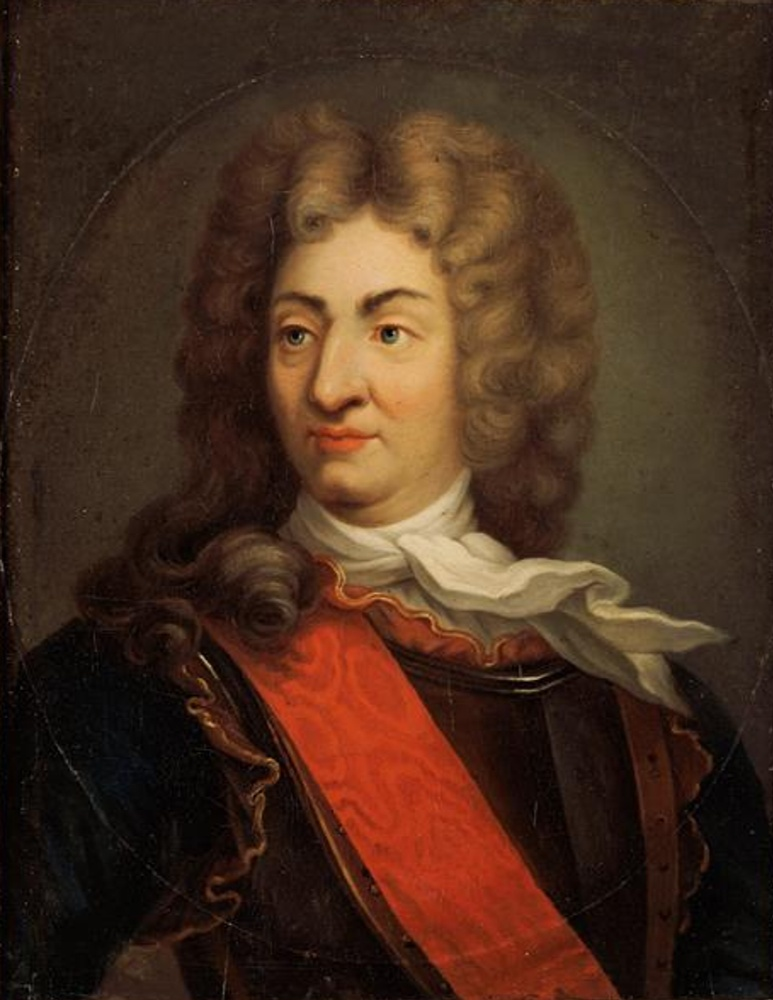
Duguay-Trouin (1673–1736)

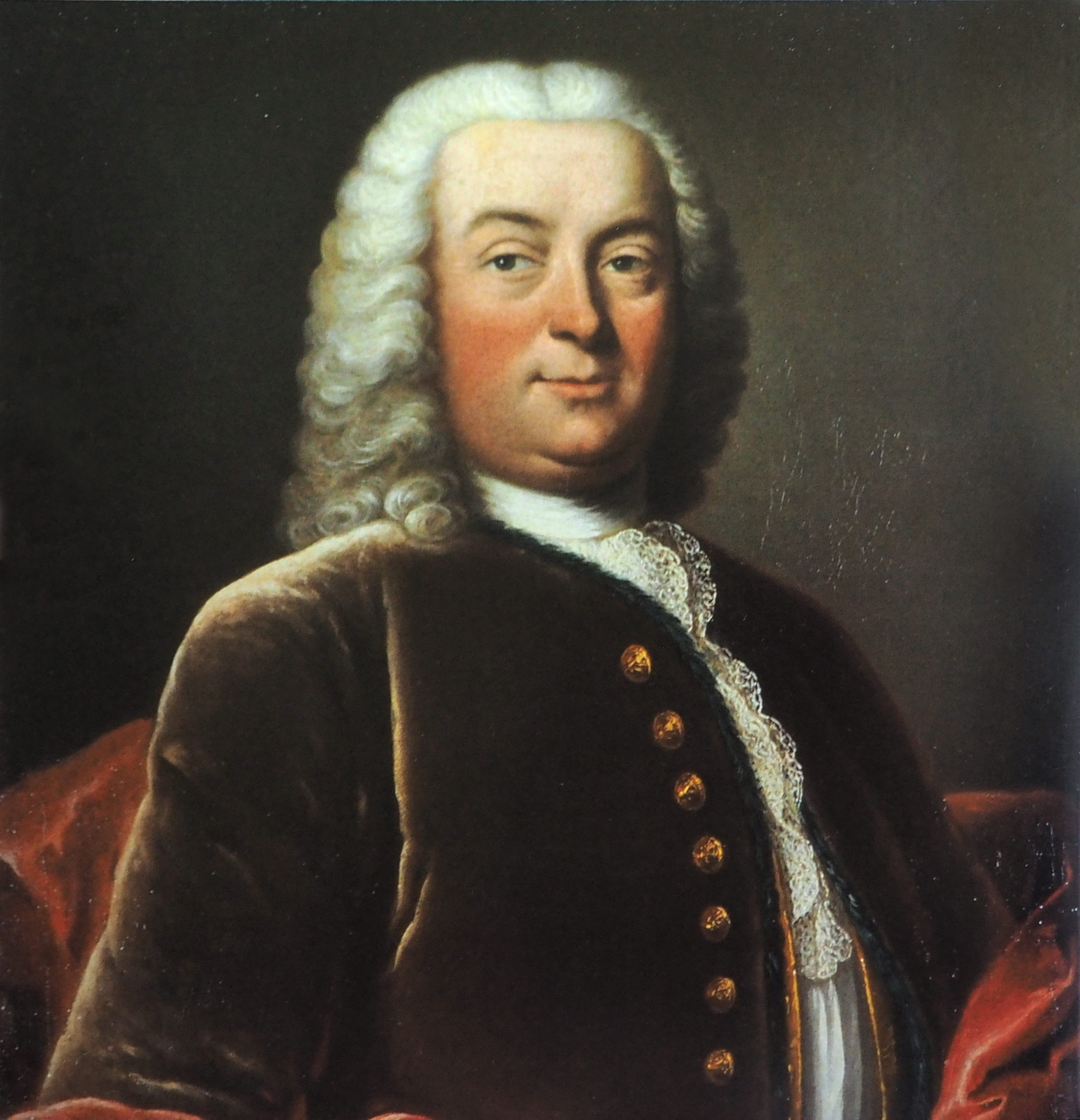
Robert Surcouf (1702–1756)

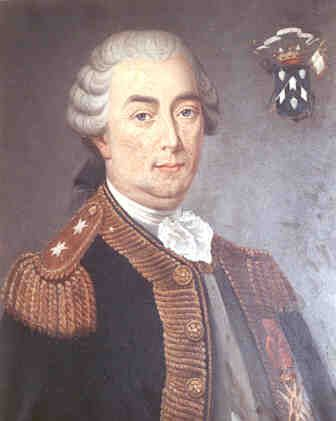
Julien Pépin, seigneur de Belle-Isle (1705–1785)
