= Jean Ango =

16th-century French merchant and pirate

Jean Ango or Jehan Angot
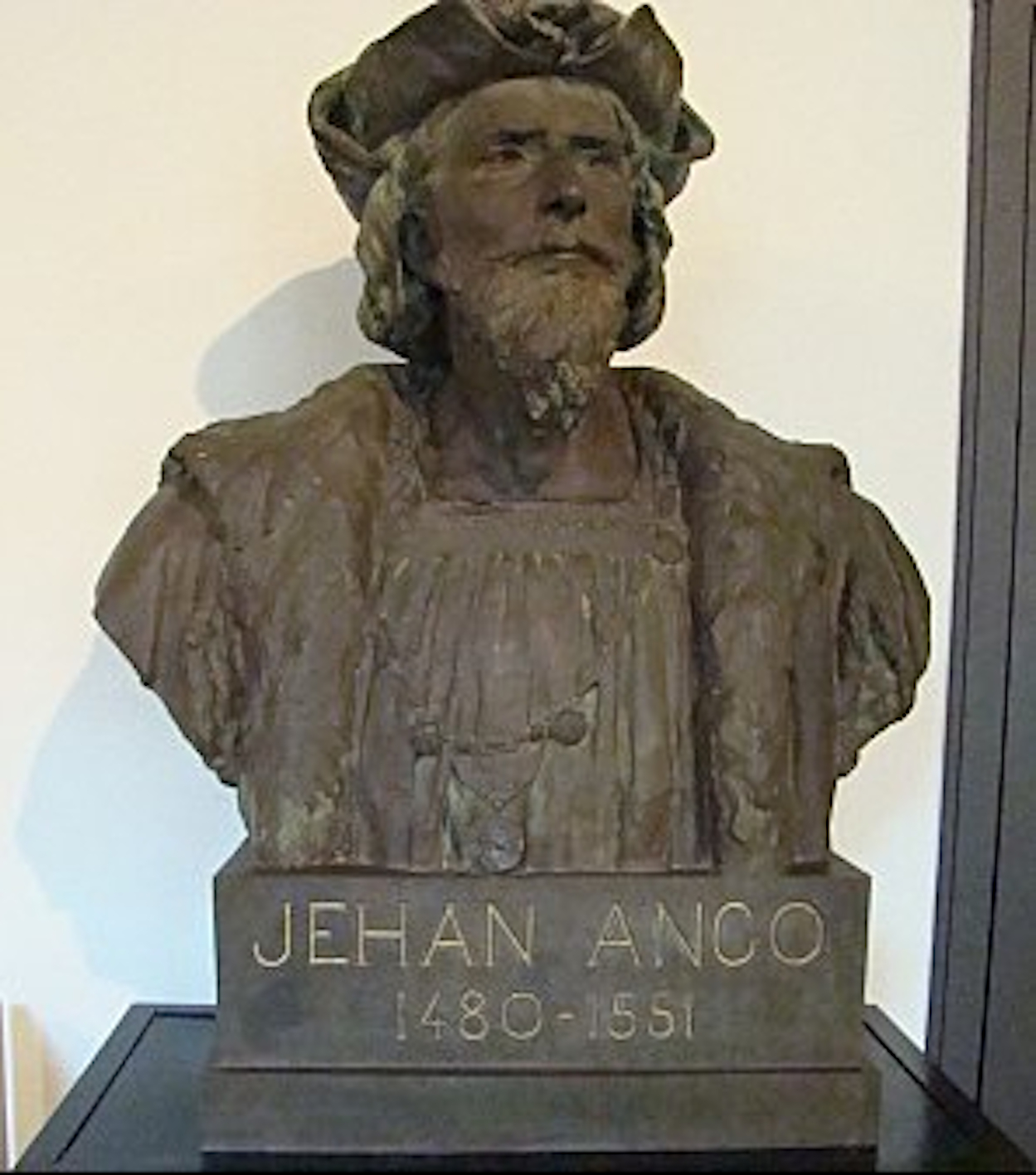
- Born: 1480; Dieppe, Seine-Maritime, Province of Normandy, Kingdom of France
- Died: 1551 (aged 70–71)
- Piratical career
- Type: Privateer
- Allegiance: Kingdom of France
- Years active: 1530s
- Rank: Captain
- Base of operations: Atlantic Ocean
- Later work: Viscount of Dieppe

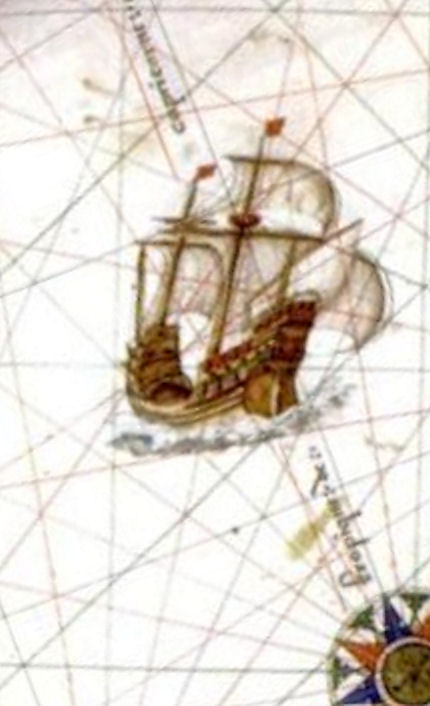
Sailing ship near Java la Grande in Vallard Atlas 1547, Dieppe school.

Jean Ango (an Italianized form of Jehan Angot) (1480–1551) was a Norman shipowner who provided ships to Francis I, King of France, for exploration of the globe. A native of Dieppe, Ango took over his father's import-export business and ventured into the spice trade with Africa and India. He was one of the first French traders to challenge the monopoly of Spain and Portugal, in addition to trading with the eastern Mediterranean, the British Isles, and the Low Countries. He also helped to finance the voyages of Giovanni da Verrazzano and Jacques Cartier.

His father (also named Jean Ango) sent two ships to Newfoundland in an early colonization attempt, including Jehan Denis and Thomas Aubert as captain of the Pensée. Their arrival in 1508 is the second recorded voyage of a French ship to the Grand Banks after the expedition of John Cabot. After his father's death (probably in the final years of the reign of King Louis XII), the younger Jean Ango stopped any personal participation in trading voyages and settled in Dieppe with his inherited fortune.

He eventually controlled a fleet, partially or alone, of 70 ships, including merchant ships and fishing vessels. Although he funded expeditions for trade and exploration, and used his ships (legally) for wartime raids, "he also sponsored voyages whose only purpose was piracy".

Ango was an intimate friend of King Francis I. In 1521 he was styled Viscount of Dieppe, and in 1533, after the king had visited him in his mansion in Normandy, captain of Dieppe. When John III of Portugal confiscated one of his ships which carried plunder from captured vessels, Ango received the French king's permission to respond. Acting under a letter of marque issued on 26 July 1530, he harassed the Portuguese fleet in the Atlantic, and even threatened to block the port of Lisbon.

He lost popularity under King Henry II. He was imprisoned after 1549 for failing to pay taxes on his profits from privateering. In his book La chanson des pilotes, he was the first to describe in writing the use of tobacco.
