= Verrazano =

Giovanni da Verrazzano (or Verrazano; 1491–1528) was an Italian explorer.

Verrazano or Verrazzano may also refer to:

== People ==
- Luigi Ridolfi Vay da Verrazzano (1895–1958), Italian politician, entrepreneur and sporting director

== Buildings ==
- Castle of Verrazzano, Tuscany, Italy
- Verrazano Bridge (disambiguation), several bridges in the United States

== Other uses ==
- Il commissario Verrazzano, a 1978 Italian film
- Italian destroyer Giovanni da Verrazzano, a ship of the Royal Italian Navy in World War II
- Verrazano (horse) (foaled 2010), American race horse
- Verrazzano Open, a short-lived French tennis tournament
