= Chianti (region) =

Wine-producing area of Tuscany, Italy

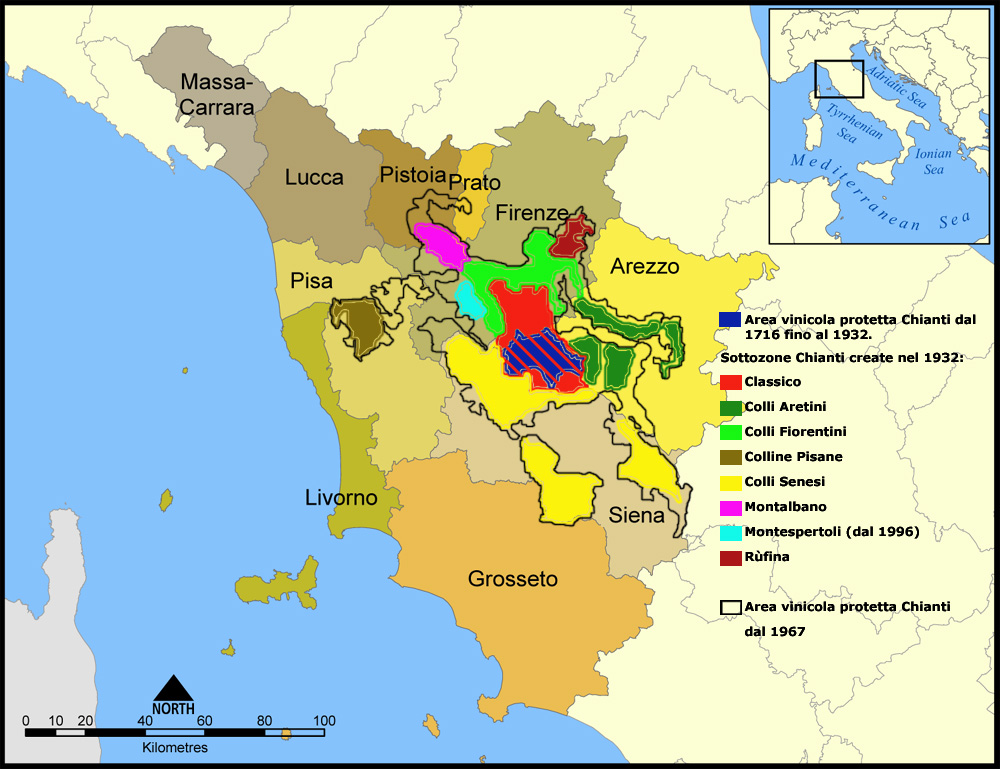
Map of Chianti

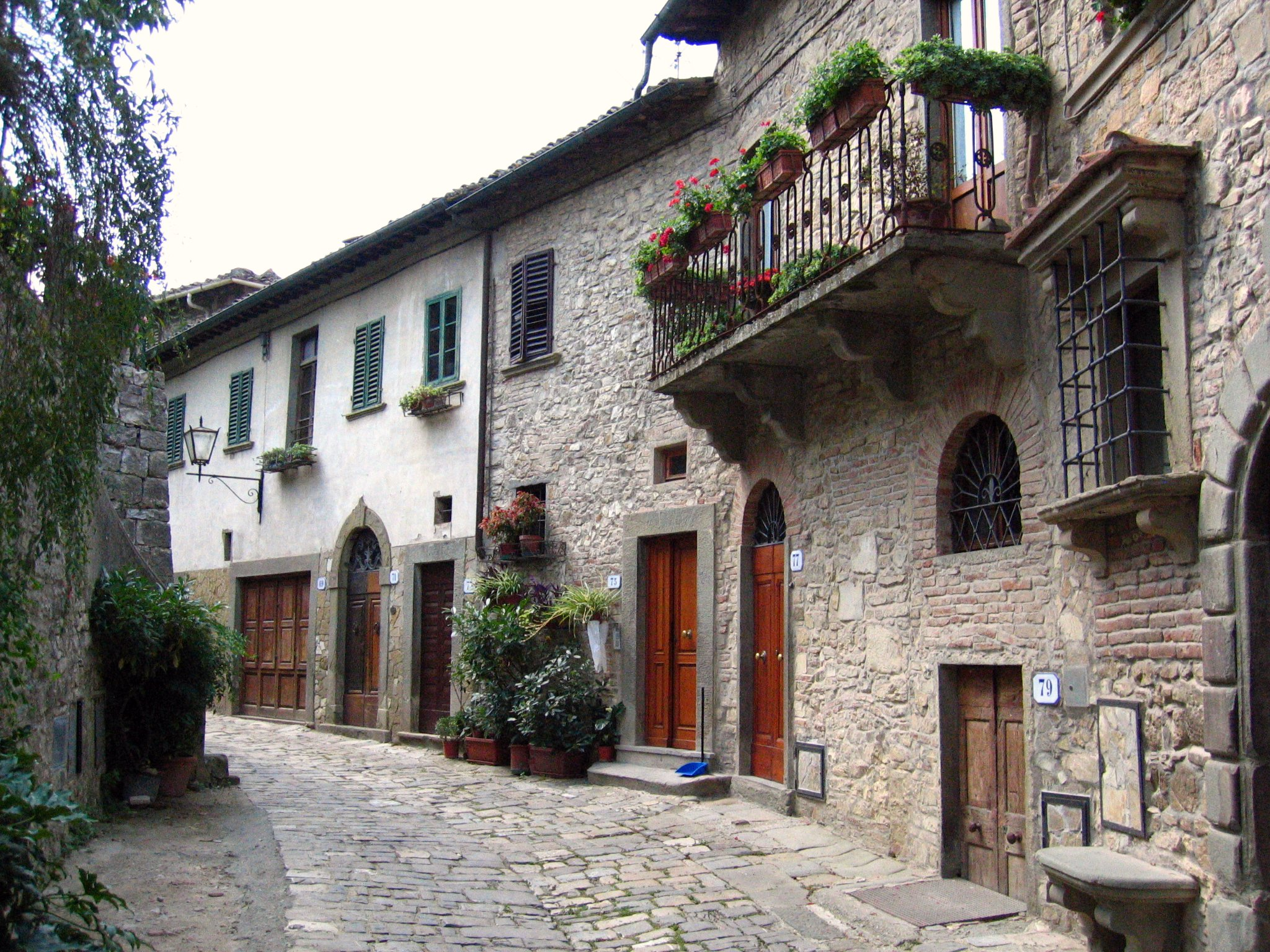
Montefioralle

Chianti (Italian pronunciation: [ˈkjanti]), in Italy also referred to as Monti del Chianti ("Chianti Mountains") or Colline del Chianti ("Chianti Hills"), is a mountainous area of Tuscany in the provinces of Florence, Siena and Arezzo, composed mainly of hills and mountains. It is known for the wine produced in and named for the region, Chianti.

== History ==
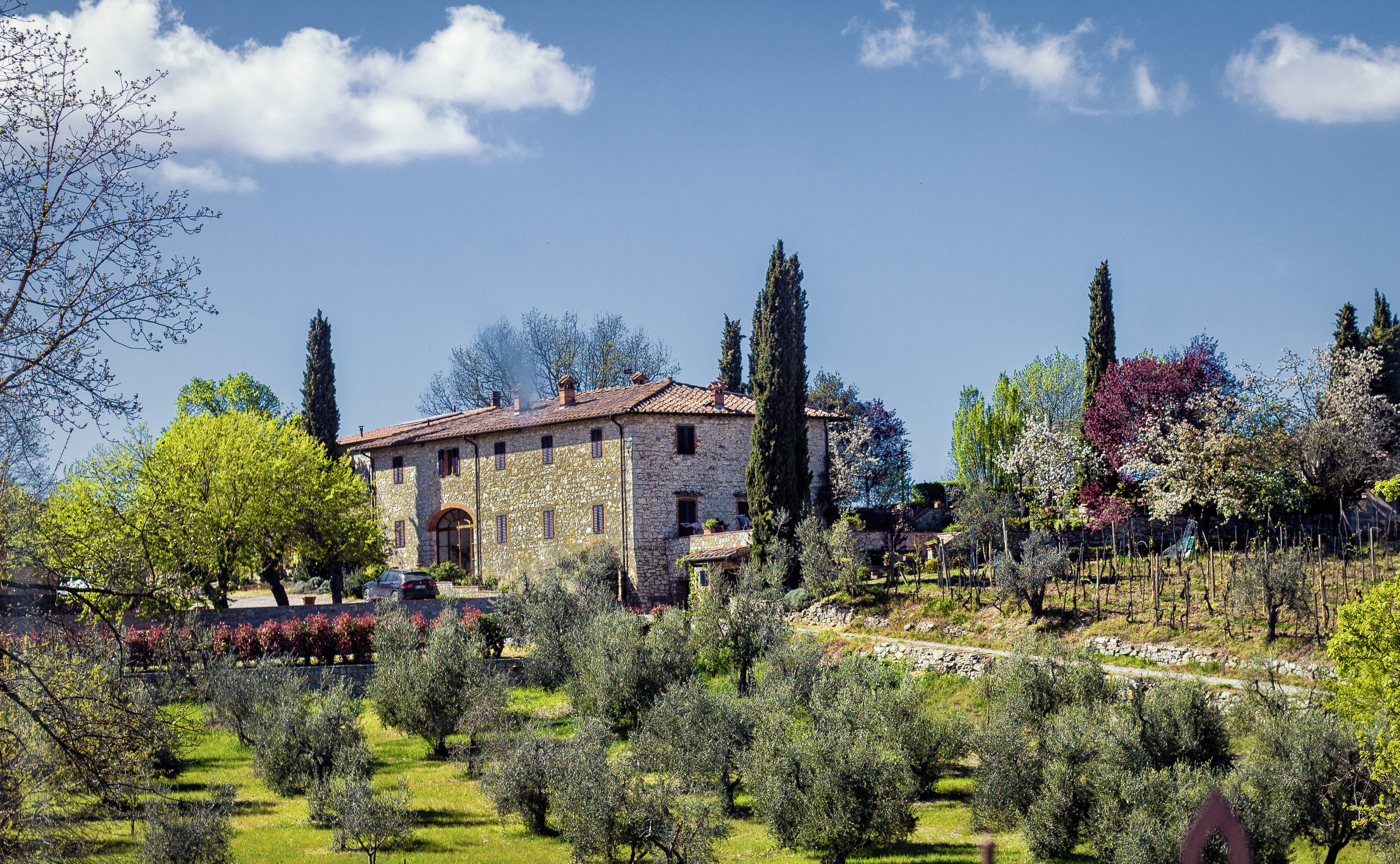
Poggio Amorelli, a typical winery of Chianti region

The territory of Chianti was initially limited, in the thirteenth century, by the municipalities of Gaiole in Chianti, Radda in Chianti and Castellina in Chianti and thus defined the "Chianti League" (Lega di Chianti).

Cosimo III de' Medici, Grand Duke of Tuscany, even decided in 1716 to issue an edict in which he officially recognized the boundaries of the Chianti district, which was the first legal document in the world to define a wine production area.

The villages of Chianti are often characterized by Romanesque churches and fortified medieval castles, signs of the ancient wars between Siena and Florence or as Monteriggioni, a fortified village north of Siena, on the ancient Via Cassia that leads to Florence.

In 1932, the wine designation specified the production limits for Chianti Classico, which is a DOCG (in Italian "Denominazione di Origine Controllata e Garantita", governed by Italian regulations).

== Geography ==
In addition to the cities already mentioned at the origin of this region, the city of Greve in Chianti radically expresses its connection directly in its name or as Impruneta which claims the name Impruneta in Chianti although it is not an official designation.

== Agriculture ==
Like all rural regions of Tuscany, there is no monoculture and there are vineyards, olive trees, cereals and potatoes.

=== Silviculture ===
In the lower hills, there is the exploitation of oak woods, on the higher hills those of chestnut and holm oaks. Everywhere there are cypresses.

=== Viticulture ===
The name of Chianti wine refers to a region strictly located in the provinces of Florence, Siena, Arezzo, Pistoia, Pisa and Prato.

Cities in the region with explicit reference in their names:

- Greve in Chianti and its hamlets: Panzano in Chianti, San Polo in Chianti
- Radda in Chianti
- Gaiole in Chianti
- Castellina in Chianti

== See also ==
- Chiantishire
