= Villa Bordoni =

Villa Bordoni is an Italian villa outside of Greve in Chianti in Tuscany, close to Montefioralle. It has been restored into a country house hotel by David and Catherine Gardner. It is 45 minutes from Florence.

== The history of Villa Bordoni ==
Villa Bordoni is a ‘Patrician Villa’ – the former country residence of the Bordonis, a family of wealthy merchants from the city of Florence. To understand the history of the Villa, one has to understand the history of the Greve Valley and beyond to the cluster of city-states that are known today as Italy.

Florence and Siena were separate countries in the Middle Ages – great rivals, frequently at war with one another. The valley of the river Greve, which gives its name to the nearest town, was of great strategic importance, and all too frequently the battleground of the Florentine and Sienese armies; hence the concentration of castles and fortified villages present in the area. The origins of Villa Bordoni date back to the 11th century, when all that stood there were a stone tower or a keep, with thick walls and arrow slits, attached to a solid dungeon for prisoners of war. Over the centuries a network of fragile alliances brought relative peace to the region, and permitted the structure to evolve into a farmhouse, albeit a fortified one.

During the 17th century, this ‘casa colonica’ was purchased by a wealthy family from Florence, as a form of summer country residence and hunting lodge, and was slowly transformed into a Villa, with its stuccoed façade and Italian garden. During the 18th century, Giuseppe Bordoni made this Villa his permanent home and invested heavily in the vineyards, producing a renowned Chianti Classico since 1782, taking the name of ‘Mezzuola’ – the hamlet which surrounded his residence. At that time, the entire hamlet and several dozen hectares of excellent farmland belonged to the Bordonis.

During the Industrial Revolution, and the ensuing process of urbanisation, the region of Chianti became uninhabited, blighted with poverty, and the sons of many farmers fled the countryside to search for a better life in the cities of Italy and abroad. After the Second World War, the heir to the dwindling family fortune tried her best to defend the family property, but over the years found herself having to sell off parcels of land and entire farmhouses in order to preserve the Villa and the core of the farm. Being married to an artist of dubious talents did not help, as he helped the fortune to dwindle by paying for exhibitions of his work all over Europe.

During the 1980s and 90s the then widowed, heirless, ageing Mrs. Bordoni became gradually more eccentric. A tiny lady, less than 5 feet tall, she dressed in thick tweeds and hunting capes even in midsummer; one could say a Dickensian character. That was not to say that she is not lucid even in her dotage, often managing to ’put one over’ on the local farming folk in her wine and olive oil trading. However, latterly, her eccentricity became too much, as she started to live almost as a tramp in just one room of the villa, with no running water, surrounded by bundles of old newspapers that she refused to throw away, and also by a large collection of stuffed animals (including an alligator) – hunting trophies of her great-grandfather... With only her many cats and at least 20 tortoises for company, but with little human contact, in 1997, with great difficulty and reluctance, she made the painful decision to leave the spartan conditions of Mezzuola behind her, and retire to an old folk's home in her native Florence...
