= Ponte agli Stolli =

- Frazione
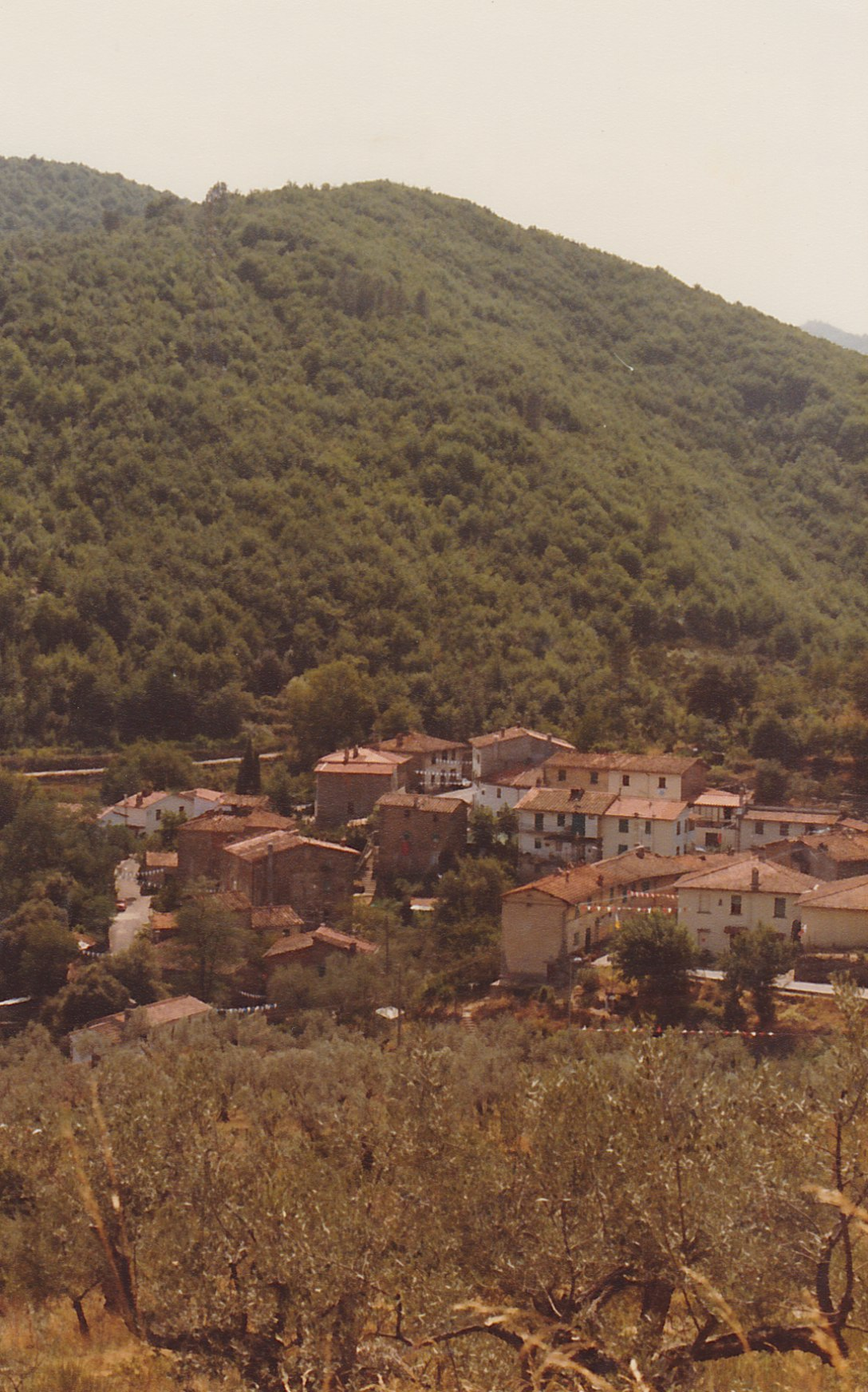
- View of Ponte agli Stolli

- Location within Tuscany Location within Italy
- Coordinates: 43°36′4″N 11°24′42″E
- Country: Italy
- Region: Tuscany
- Province: Metropolitan City of Florence
- Comune: Figline e Incisa Valdarno
- Elevation: 298 m (978 ft)

Population (2011)
  - Total: 177
- Time zone: UTC+1 (CET)
  - Summer (DST): UTC+2 (CEST)
- Postal code: 50063
- Dialing code: 055

Ponte agli Stolli is a hamlet (frazione) in the comune of Figline e Incisa Valdarno in the Metropolitan City of Florence in Tuscany, Italy. As of 2011, it had a population of 177. The hamlet lies to the east of Greve in Chianti and to the west of Figline Valdarno, and, as such, is located on the SP16 Chianti-Valdarno road.
