= Pieve of San Leolino =

Coordinates: 43.5329°N 11.3120°E

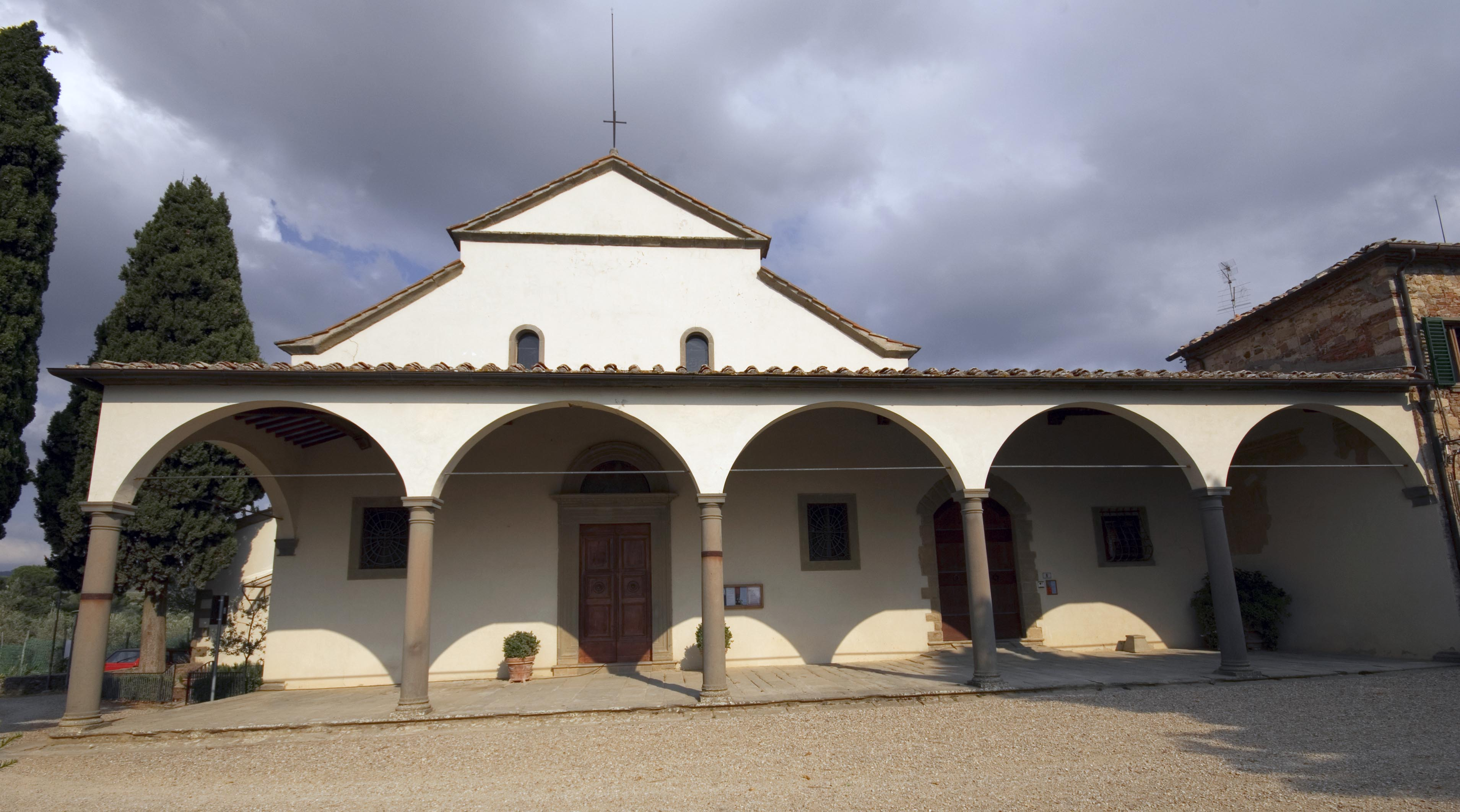
Pieve of San Leolino

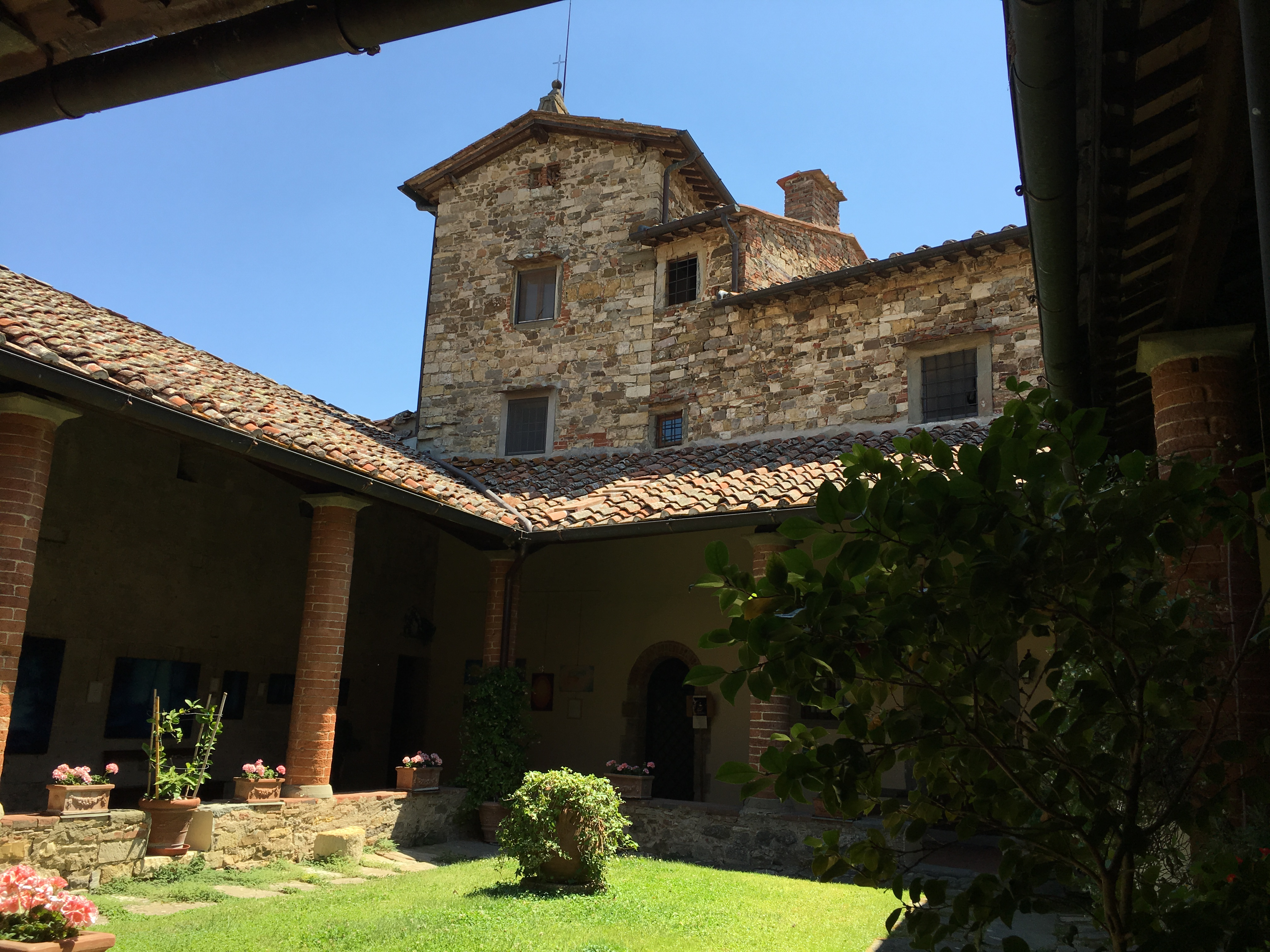
Courtyard of Pieve di San Leolino

The pieve (parish church) of San Leolino is a catholic place of worship near Panzano in Chianti, Greve in Chianti comune, in the province of Florence. It belongs to the diocese of Fiesole.

The earliest known reference to the pieve dates from 982, where it is referred to as San Leolino in Flacciano, in a parchment of the Abbey of Passignano, but two sculptural fragments within the church suggest even older origins.

The current building dates from the twelfth century, as can be deduced from the structure and architectural style. In medieval times the church had great importance. In 1508 the patronage of the church passed to the Hospital of Santa Maria Nuova in Florence.

The church was subject to various restoration and renovation projects throughout its history, however in 1942 restoration was undertaken that returned the church to its original Romanesque appearance.
