= Figline e Incisa Valdarno =

- Comune
- Comune di Figline e Incisa Valdarno
- Coat of arms

- Location within Italy Location within Tuscany
- Coordinates: 43°39′24″N 11°26′59″E
- Country: Italy
- Region: Tuscany
- Province: Florence (FI)
- Frazioni: Burchio, Brollo, Cesto-Gaville, Palazzolo, Poggio alla Croce, Ponte agli Stolli, Porcellino-Restone

Government
  - Mayor: Giulia Mugnai (Democratic Party)

Area
  - Total: 97.9 km^{2} (37.8 sq mi)
- Elevation: 122 m (400 ft)

Population (31 August 2017)
  - Total: 23,376
  - Density: 239/km^{2} (618/sq mi)
- Time zone: UTC+1 (CET)
  - Summer (DST): UTC+2 (CEST)
- Postal code: 50063
- Dialing code: 055
- Website: Official website

Figline e Incisa Valdarno is a comune (municipality) in the Metropolitan City of Florence in the Italian region Tuscany, located about 20 kilometres (12 mi) southeast of Florence.

It has been created on January 1, 2014 with the union of the municipalities of Figline Valdarno and Incisa in Val d'Arno.
