= Poggio alla Croce =

- Frazione
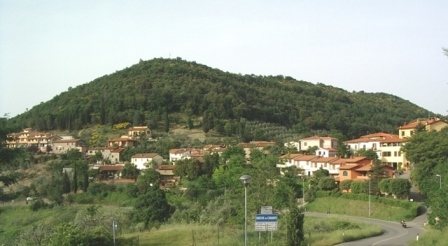
- View of Poggio alla Croce

- Location within Tuscany Location within Italy
- Coordinates: 43.65123°N 11.39432°E
- Country: Italy
- Region: Tuscany
- Province: Metropolitan City of Florence
- Comune: Figline e Incisa Valdarno Greve in Chianti
- Elevation: 1,115 m (3,658 ft)

Population (2015)
  - Total: 177
- Time zone: UTC+1 (CET)
  - Summer (DST): UTC+2 (CEST)
- Postal code: 50063
- Dialing code: 055

Poggio alla Croce is a village (frazione) divided between the comuni of Figline e Incisa Valdarno and Greve in Chianti, in the Metropolitan City of Florence in Tuscany, Italy. It had a population of 67 as of 2015. The village lies to the northwest of Figline Valdarno and to the southeast of Strada in Chianti and is located on the SP56 road.

== Gallery ==
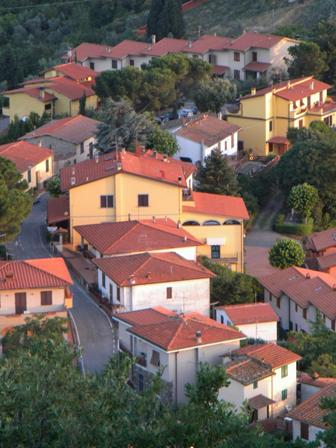
View of residences

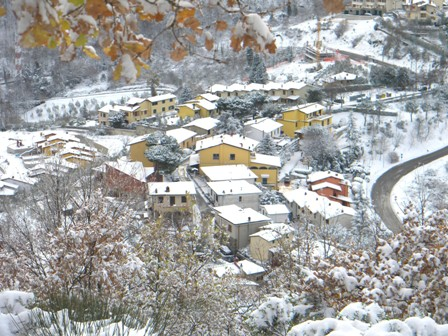
Poggio alla Croce in the snow

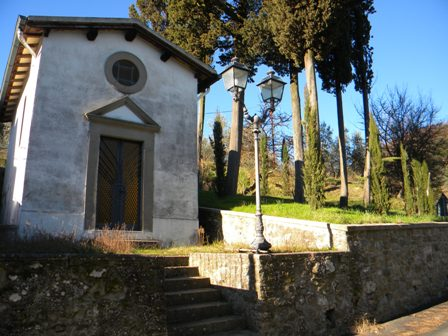
Chapel

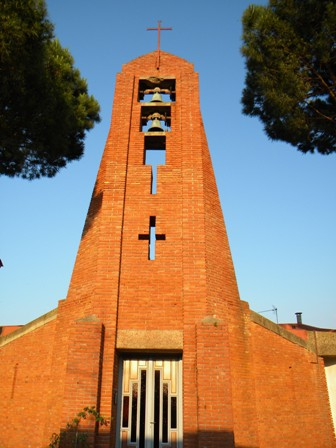
Church
