= Castle of Verrazzano =

Castle in Tuscany, Italy

Coordinates: 43°36′06″N 11°17′04″E

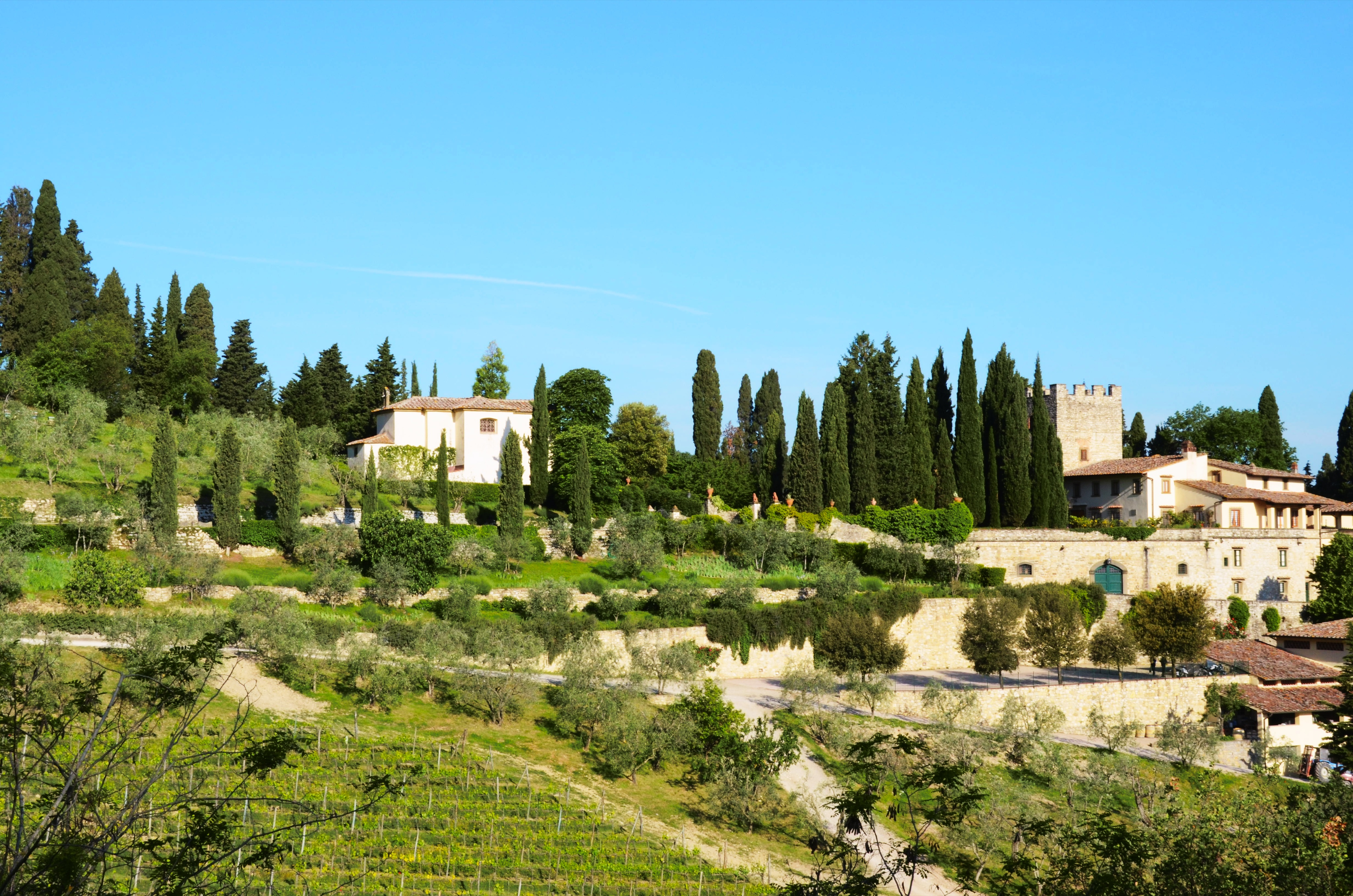
View of the castle

The Castle of Verrazzano (Italian: Castello di Verrazzano) is located about a mile from the center of Greve in Chianti in Tuscany, Italy, and sits on a mountain spur above the River Greve.

The castle dates back to an Etruscan, and then Roman, settlement. The Verrazzano family held the castle for centuries and the navigator Giovanni da Verrazzano is said to have been born there in 1485.

The last Verrazzano died in 1819, and the property passed through various wealthy Florentine families before coming to the Cappellini family in 1958.

A monument in New York City at the Verrazzano–Narrows Bridge, which was named after Giovanni, includes three stones that were carved from the ancient wall of the castle.
