= Verrazano Bridge (disambiguation) =

Verrazzano Bridge or Verrazzano-Narrows Bridge (formerly spelled Verrazano-Narrows) is a suspension bridge between Brooklyn and Staten Island in New York City.

Verrazano Bridge or Verrazzano Bridge may also refer to:

- Jamestown Verrazzano Bridge, a box girder bridge over Narragansett Bay in Rhode Island
- Verrazano Bridge (Maryland), a plate girder bridge connecting Assateague Island in Maryland
