= Montefioralle =

Italian village

Coordinates: 43°34′51″N 11°18′10″E

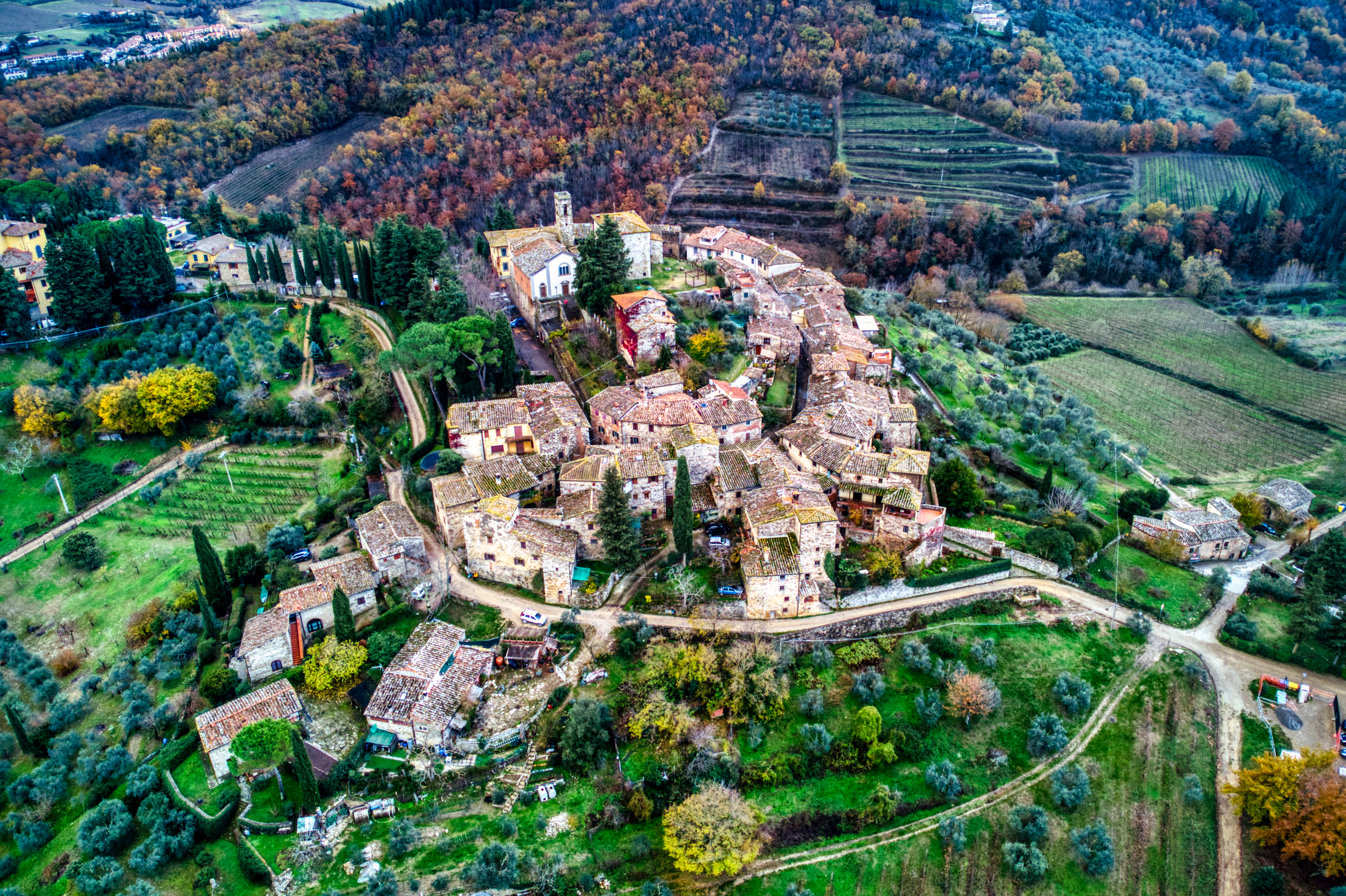
Panoramic view of Montefioralle

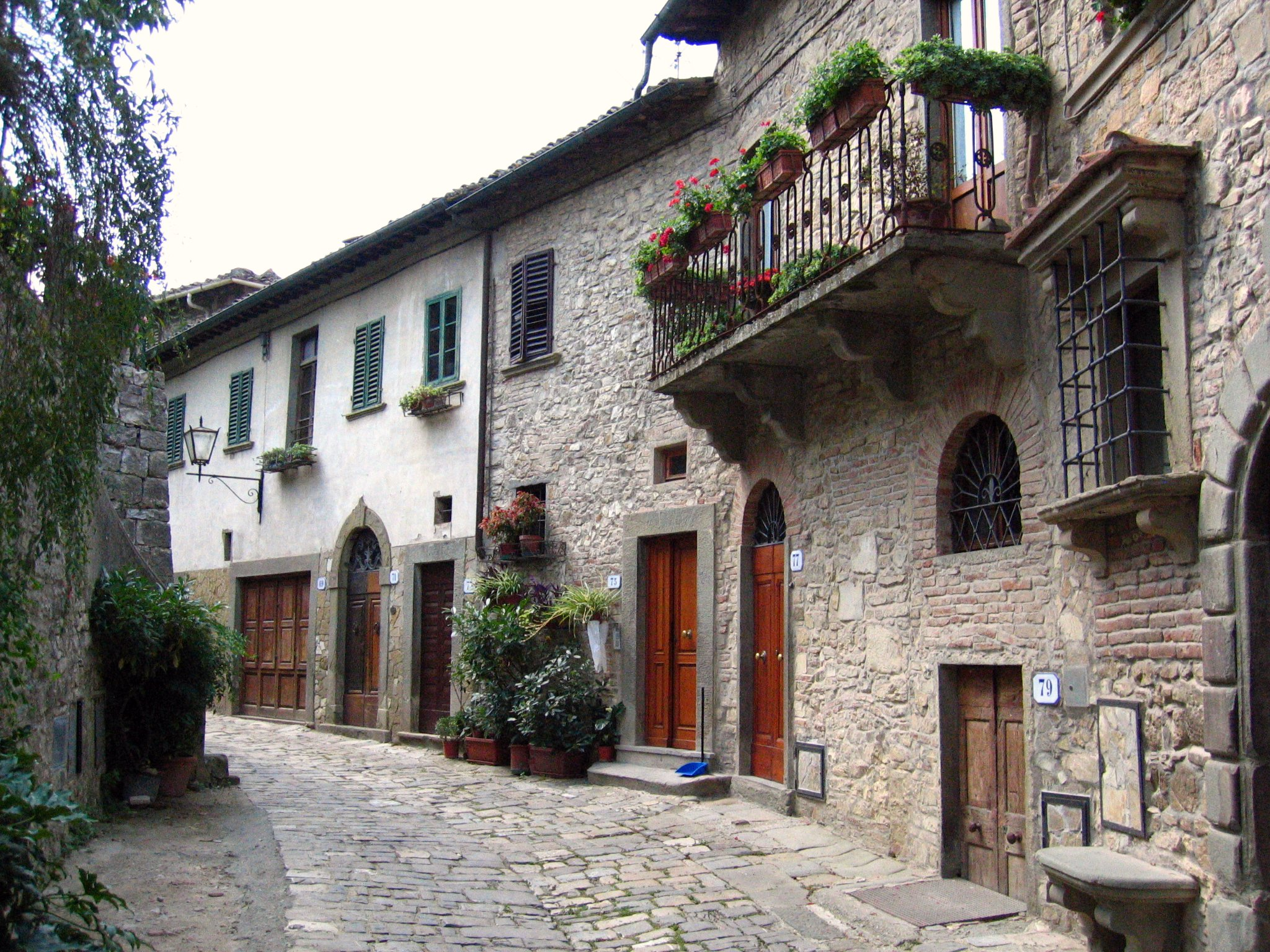
Montefioralle street

Montefioralle is a village in Tuscany, a frazione of the comune of Greve in Chianti. It is sometimes claimed to be the birthplace of Amerigo Vespucci, though in fact it is known that Vespucci was born (on 9 March 1454) in Florence, in the suburb of Peretola. It is one of I Borghi più belli d'Italia ("The most beautiful villages of Italy").

== Geography ==
The village lies about a mile west of Greve.

== History ==
Town and village were an important stronghold during the wars between Florence and Siena. In 1250 it became the headquarters of the League of the Greve Valley. The town was once endowed with two sets of walls. It had an octagonal shape with four gates. With the fall of the Sienese Republic, Montefioralle lost its prior importance and most of its inhabitants moved to Greve in Chianti.

The central church is currently undergoing renovations.

== Notable residents ==
A house in the circular main street of Montefioralle is pointed out as the residence of the last descendant of Amerigo Vespucci. The doorway is identified by the wasp ("vespa") and V of the Vespucci family.

== Gallery ==
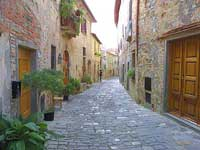
A street of the village

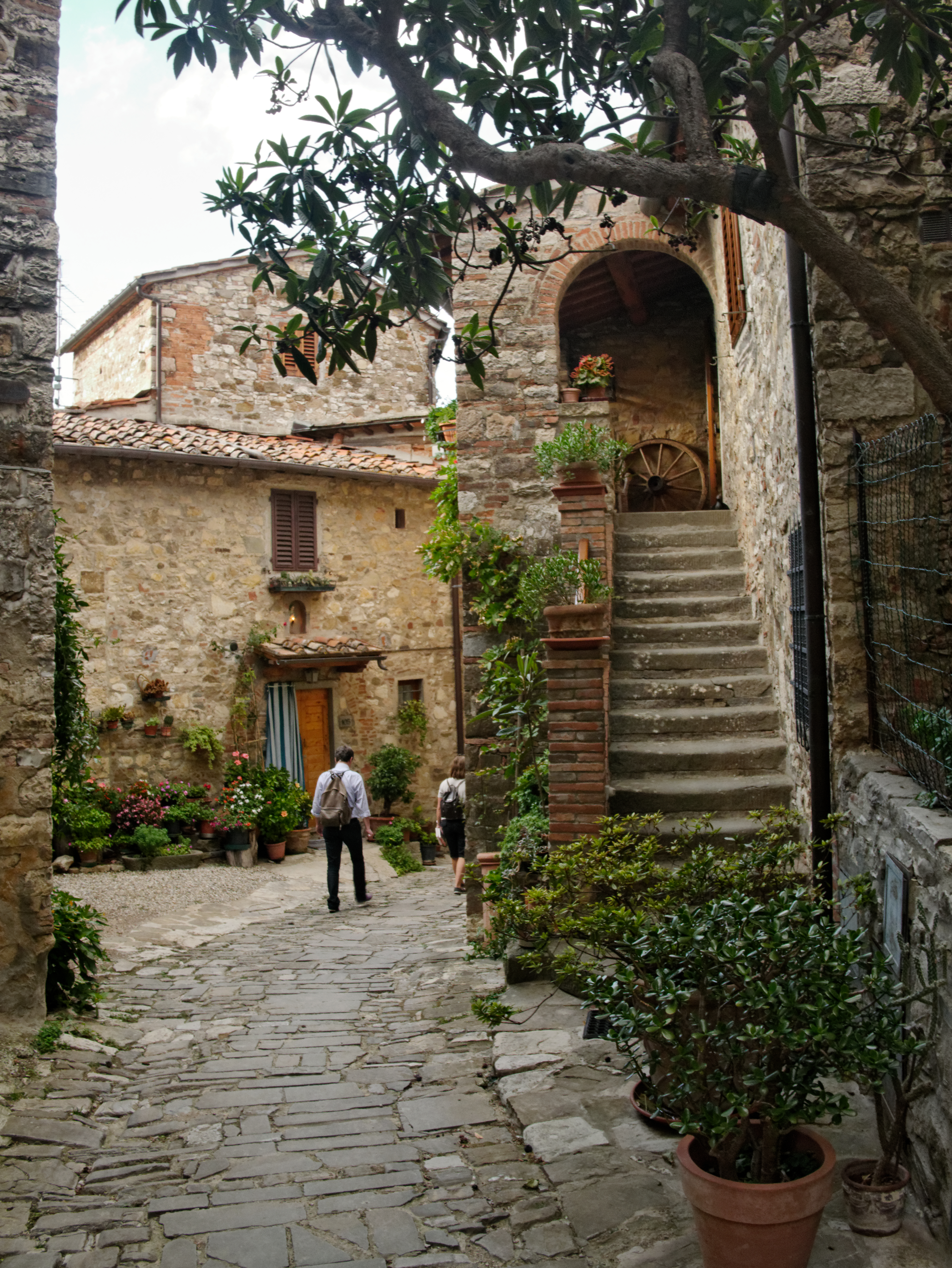
A street of the village

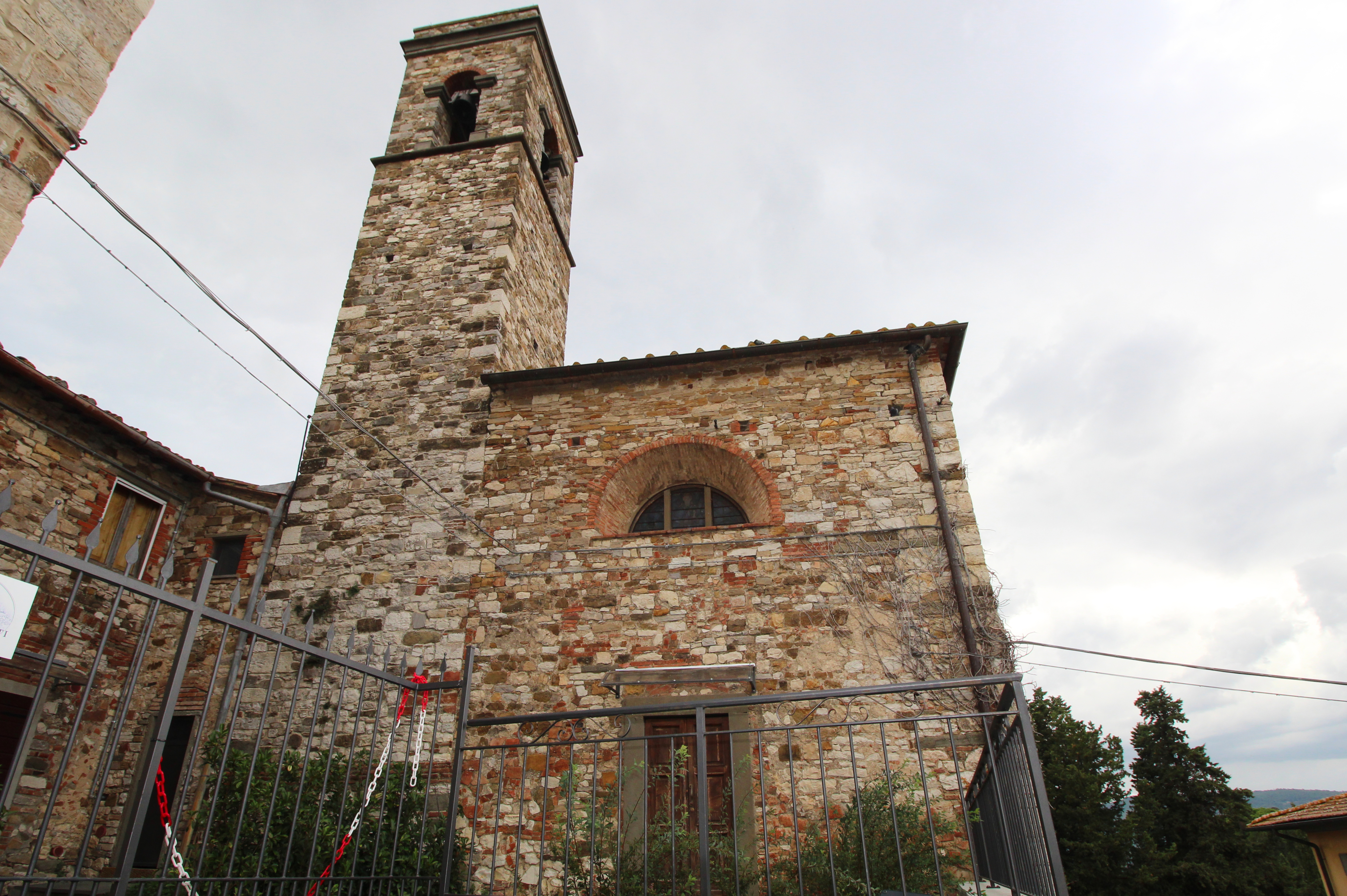
Church of Santo Stefano

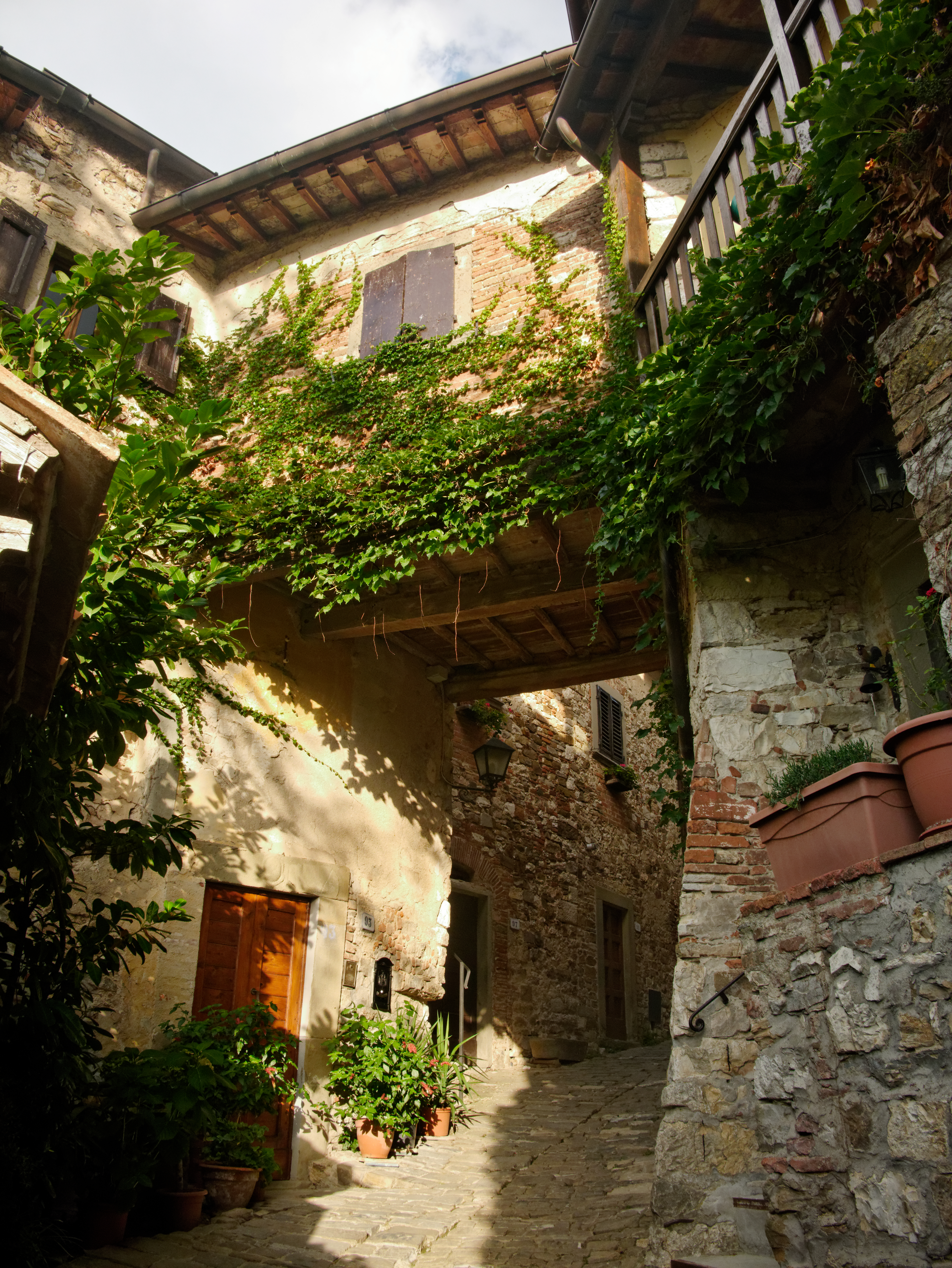
One of the entrances to the village

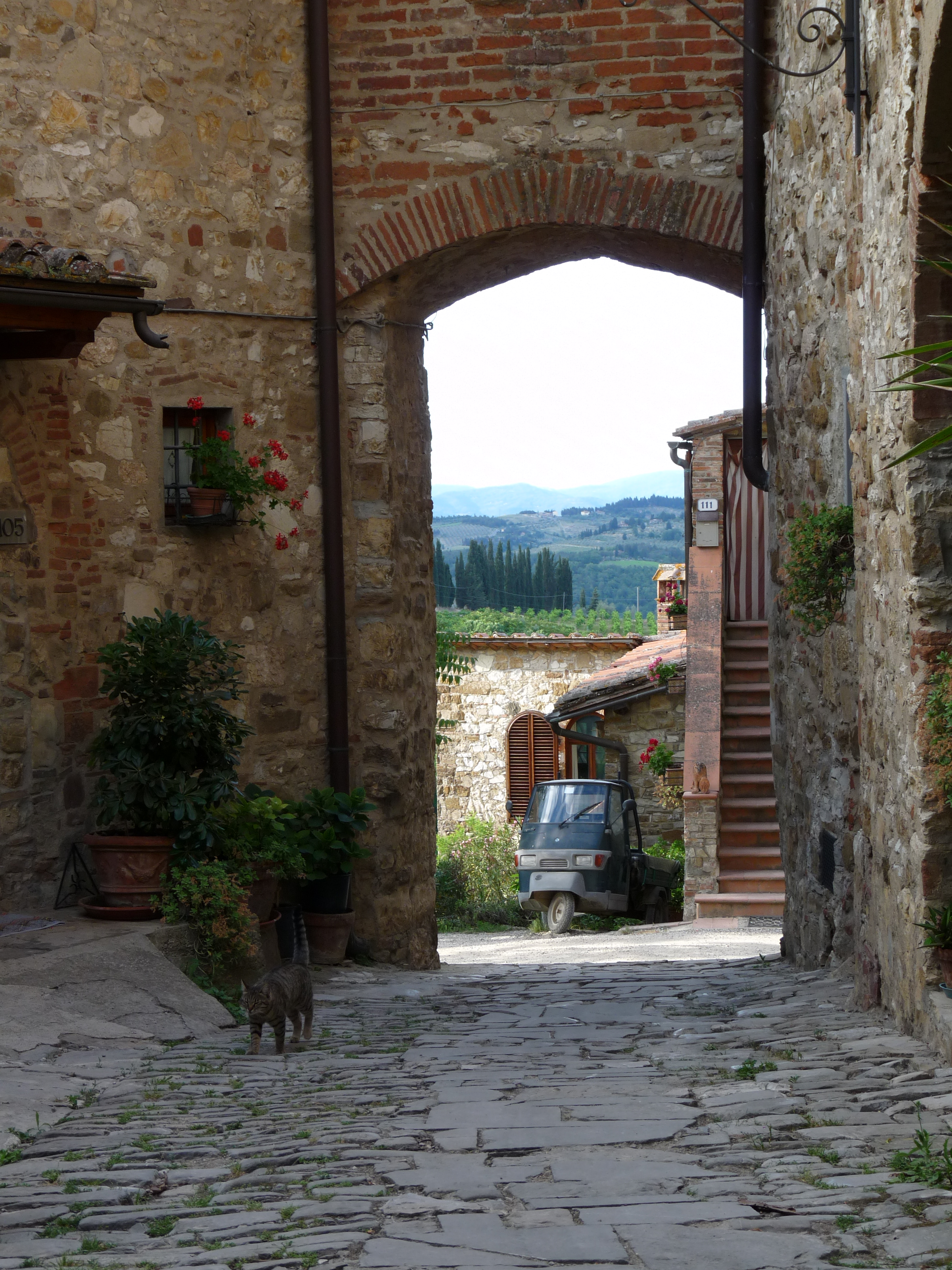
Montefioralle gate
