= Greve in Chianti =

Greve in Chianti Comune di Greve in Chianti
- Comune
- Comune di Greve in Chianti
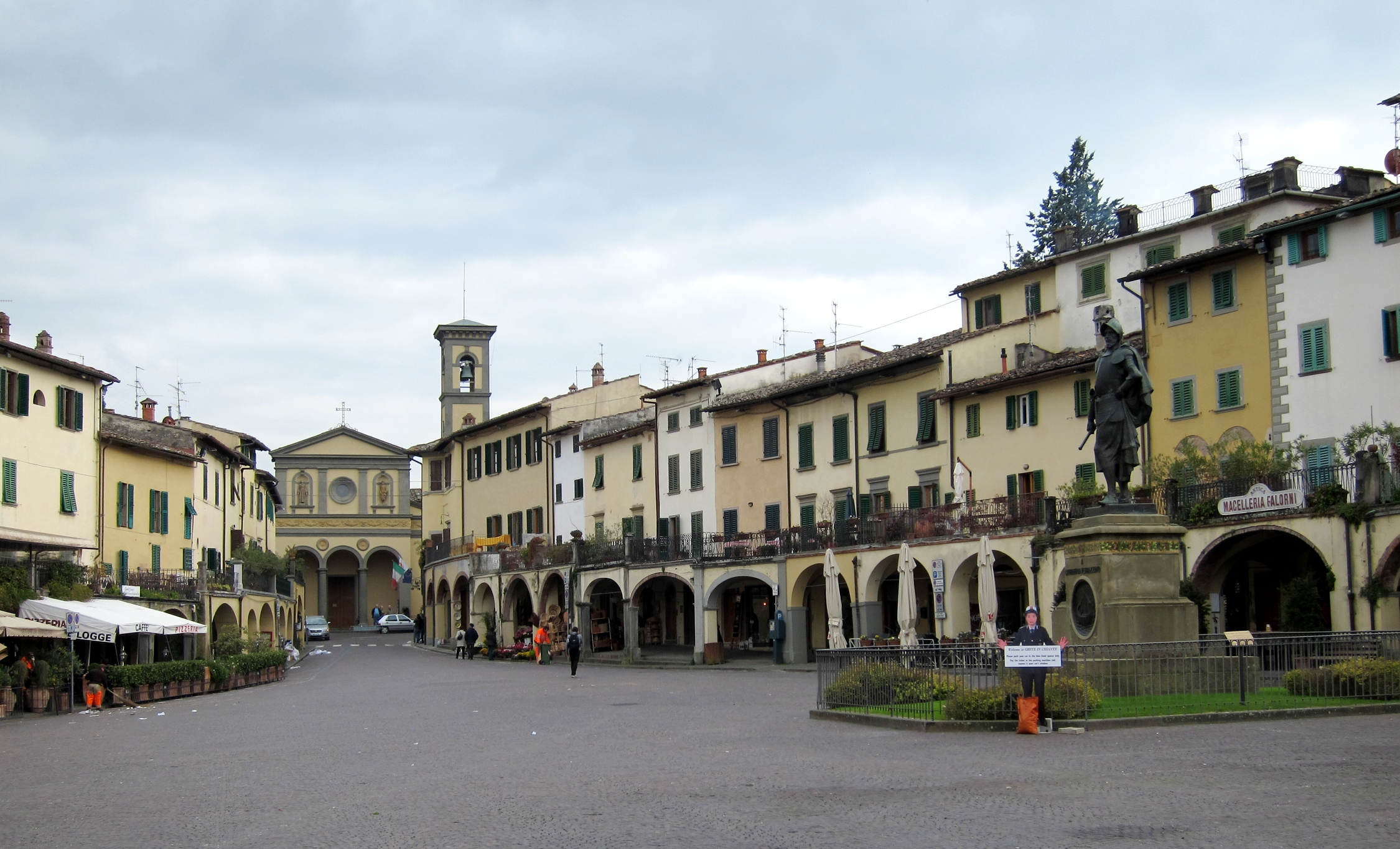

- Coat of arms

- Location within Tuscany Location within Italy
- Coordinates: 43°35′N 11°19′E
- Country: Italy
- Region: Tuscany
- Metropolitan city: Florence (FI)
- Frazioni: Borgo di Dudda, Case di Dudda, Case Poggio, Casole, Castellinuzza, Castello di Cintoia, Chiocchio, Cintoia, Dimezzano, Dudda, Ferrone, Giobbole, Le Bolle, Greti, Il Ferrone, Il Ferruzzi, Il Piano, La Panca, La Presura, La Villa, Lamole, Le Masse, Lucolena in Chianti, Montefioralle, Panzano in Chianti, Passo dei Pecorai, Pescina, Petigliolo, Petriolo, Pieve di Panzano, Poggio alla Croce, Rinforzati, Ruffoli, San Polo in Chianti, Santa Cristina, Solaia, Spedaluzzo, Strada in Chianti, Torsoli

Government
  - Mayor: Paolo Sottani

Area
  - Total: 169.38 km^{2} (65.40 sq mi)
- Elevation: 236 m (774 ft)

Population (31 August 2017)
  - Total: 13,829
  - Density: 81.645/km^{2} (211.46/sq mi)
- Demonym: Grevigiani
- Time zone: UTC+1 (CET)
  - Summer (DST): UTC+2 (CEST)
- Postal code: 50022
- Dialing code: 055
- Website: Official website

Greve in Chianti (the old name was Greve; in 1972 it was renamed Greve in Chianti after the inclusion of that area in the Chianti wine district) is a town and comune (municipality) in the Metropolitan City of Florence, Tuscany, Italy. It is located about 31 kilometres (19 mi) south of Florence and 42 kilometres (26 mi) north of Siena.

Sitting in the Val di Greve, it is named for the small, fast-flowing river that runs through it, is the principal town in the Chianti wine district that stretches south of Florence to just north of Siena. Until recently it has been a quiet, almost bucolic town because it was, and still is, well off the main roads.

Even in ancient days Greve was not isolated because it was well-connected by secondary roads to the Via Volterrana and via Francigena. Nowadays, it is connected to the A1 superstrada between Florence and Rome and the main road between Florence and Siena. The old road network ensured easy access to Florence and to other places such as Figline where its tradesmen and farmers found ready markets for their goods and produce.

Greve in Chianti is a member of Cittaslow.

== History ==
The site of Greve and the surrounding territory has been long settled, probably well before the Etruscans and then the Romans dominated the area. Historical documents of the 11th century refer to an ancient monastic settlement on a nearby hill, which is now called the hill of San Francesco. Before the Franciscans established their monastery in the 15th century, an earlier monastery dedicated to Santo Savi had already been built, and also a small hospital. Larger scale settlement occurred in the 13th and 14th centuries.

Although an independent town for most of its history, Greve ultimately came under Florentine control and remained so until the Grand Duchy of Tuscany was absorbed into the unified Kingdom of Italy in 1861.

== Main sights ==
The Franciscan monastery is still at the heart of the old part of the city, as is the triangular main piazza, where a market has been running more or less continuously for centuries serving the nearby castle communities and hamlets.

The piazza is fronted by numerous medieval aged buildings, including the 11th century Chiesa Santa Croce which was rebuilt in 1325 after being burned to the ground, along with the rest of the town, by the Duke of Lucca, Castruccio Castracani. After further renovation, the church, which houses paintings of the school of Fra Angelico, now features a neo-classical façade. In the piazza there is also a monument to navigator Giovanni da Verrazzano, who was possibly born nearby, however more recent scholarly work places his birth at Lyon, France.

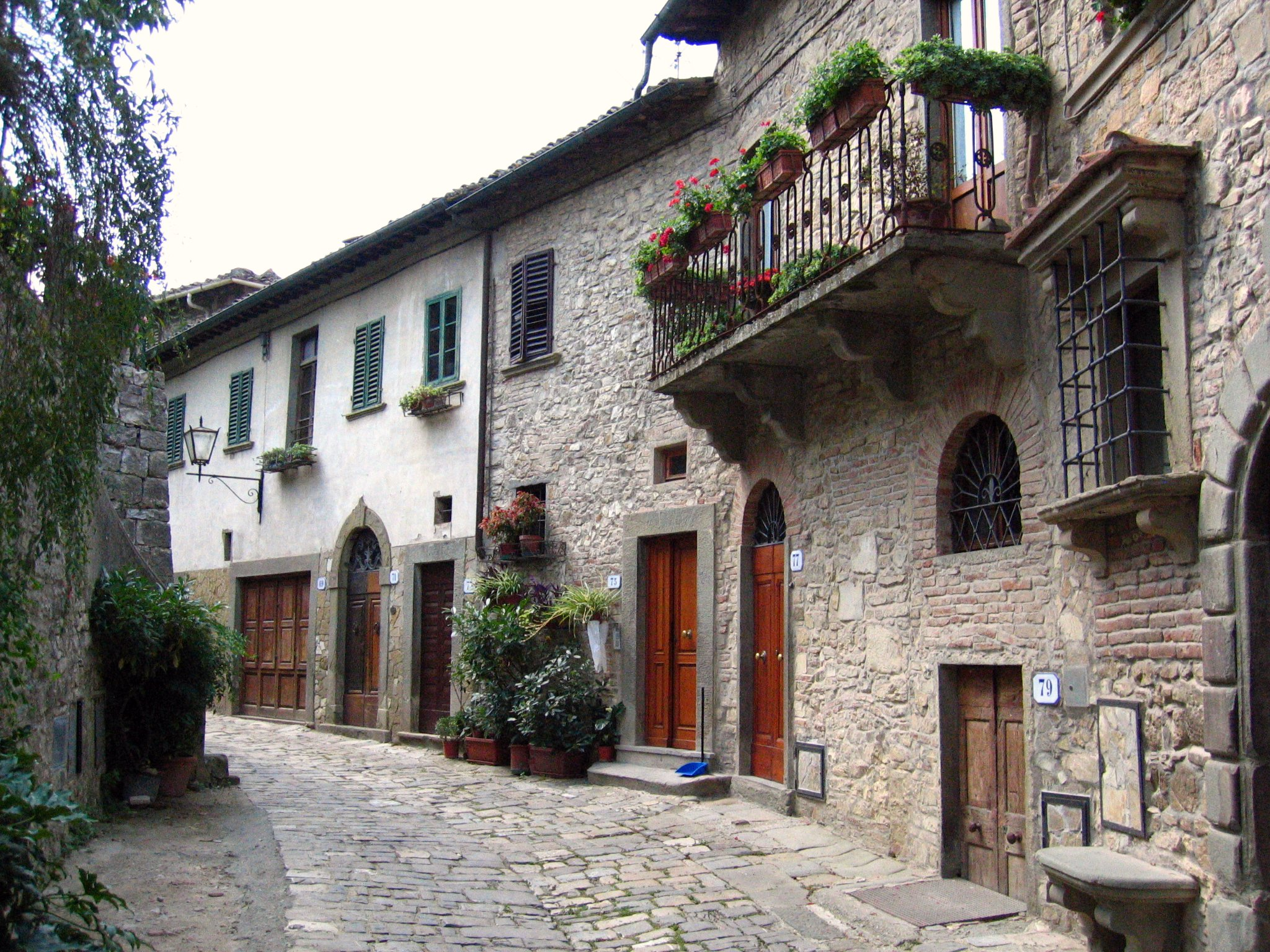
Montefioralle

In the frazione of Montefioralle is the church of Santo Stefano, with a late 13th-century Madonna with Child and a 15th-century Trinity and Saints. Also in the hamlet is a house which, according to the tradition, belonged to explorer Amerigo Vespucci. In the nearby is a Romanesque Pieve with narthexed façade and two mullioned windows.

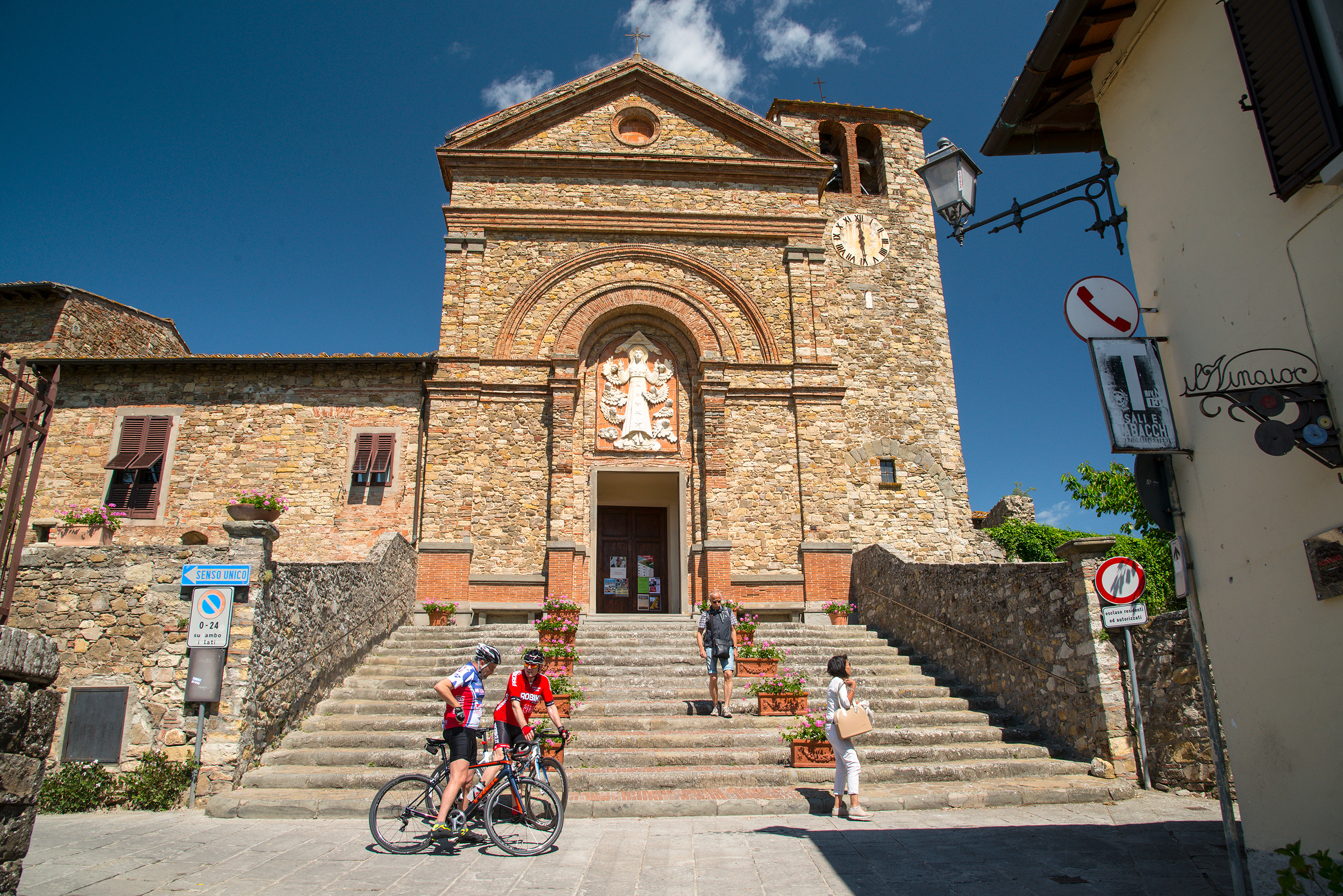
Church Santa Maria Castello in Panzano

At 2 kilometres (1 mile) from the centre of Greve is the castle of Verrazzano, sitting on a 348 metres (1,142 feet) high hill. Built probably by the Lombards, it was a possession of the explorer's family, and in the 17th century was turned into a villa. Of the 13th-century manor a tower remains.

In the neighbourhood of the frazione of Panzano is the Pieve of San Leolino, known from the 10th century. The interior houses a 13th-century panel by Meliore di Jacopo, a 15th-century polyptych by the so-called Master of Panzano, as well as works by Raffaellino del Garbo and Giovanni della Robbia.

== Wine production ==
With the enlargement of the Chianti wine district in 1932, Greve suddenly found itself in a noble wine area. The Chianti region supports a variety of agricultural activities, most especially the growing of the grapes that go into the world-famous Chianti and "Super Tuscan" wines. Olive oil production is another staple of the local economy. Extra virgin Tuscan olive oil is highly prized for its delicate flavor, as opposed to the stronger, thicker olive oils of the south. Truffle harvesting is a distinguishing feature of local food production. Both black and white truffles are hunted in Chianti. The region is also noted for its meat. The Cinta Senese pig is unique to this region and produces pork of superior quality. Wild game is a common feature on local menus, including rabbit, pigeon, venison, and, especially, cinghiale (wild boar). Greve is home to one of Italy's oldest and most renowned butcher shops, the Macelleria Falorni.

Due largely to this intense agricultural activity, and the wine and food production industries that have been built on top of it, since early medieval times, Greve evolved as the principal market town at the center of an (increasingly) densely populated area with an abundance of villages, parish churches, villas and castles. The latter were built mostly by the rich merchants and noble classes of Florence who enjoyed the country life, and developed their estates to earn additional income and also to supply their in-town tables.

The town of Greve has long been a destination for tourists and travellers. The flow of tourism and the acquisition of homes by Italian and international buyers are closely linked with the local viticulture and wine-making industries.

== Annual wine festival ==
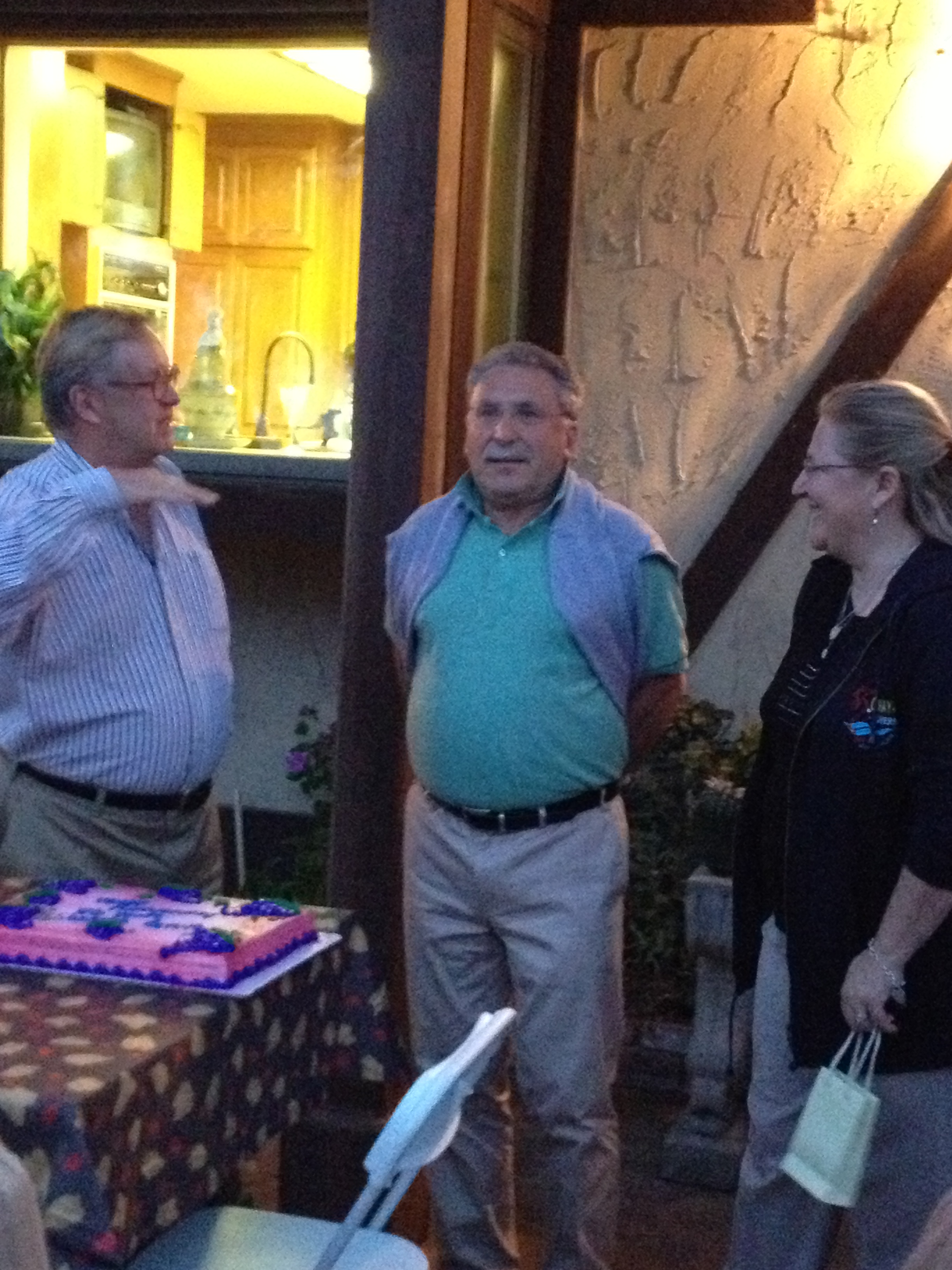
Mayor of Greve in Chianti visiting their sister city, Sonoma, California, in 2013

Chianti Classico wine festival - every year on second weekend of September and the preceding Thursday and Friday, 5 - 8th Sept 2013. On Thursday, the festival starts at about 5 pm, and on Saturday and Sunday at about 11 am and the stands close at about 8 pm. Local merchants display their products, and wine tasting is offered for free. The visitor must purchase a glass, (20€ for the 2025 festival) then go to the displays. Olive oil is also available for tasting, served on fresh sliced Italian bread. Local cheeses are also available.

== International relations ==
Greve in Chianti is twinned with:

- Greve, Denmark, since 1966
- (United States) Sonoma, USA, since 1983
- Veitshöchheim, Germany, since 1994
- Farsia, Western Sahara
- Auxerre, France, since 1988
- Brtonigla, Croatia, since 1999
- Jasenice, Croatia
- Haapsalu, Estonia, since 2004

== See also ==
- History of Chianti
- Villa Bordoni
- Chianti tramway
- Castle of Verrazzano
