= San Salvatore Abbey, Vaiano =

Church located in Italy

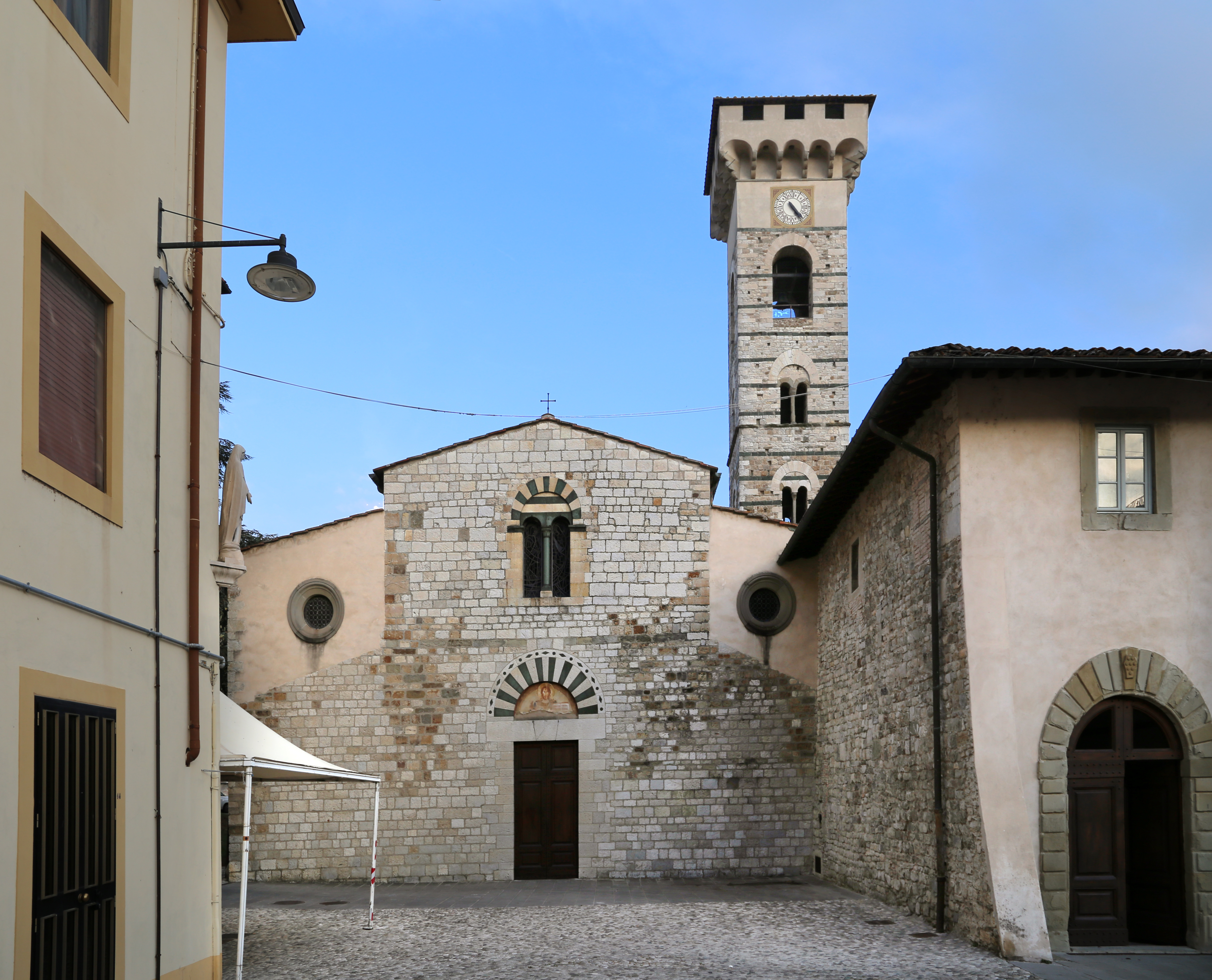

The Badia San Salvatore (also called Abbazia San Salvatore) is a Romanesque-style, Roman Catholic church with and adjacent Renaissance style abbey located on Via Monsignor G Gori #10 in the town of Vaiano in the Province of Prato, region of Tuscany, Italy.

== History ==
A monastery at the site was erected between the 9th and 10th century, under the administration of the Benedictine abbey of Monte Cassino. Archeological excavations found ancient Lombard tombs underneath the church, suggesting a prior religious structure. After the abbey was occupied by the Vallombrosian order monks in 1075, the structure was reconstructed. In 1808, the monastery was suppressed by the Napoleonic rule, and the church relegated to pastoral care until 1925.

The campanile, which stands 40 metres high, was erected in 1258. The interior includes an altarpiece depicting an Enthroned Madonna and Child with a young St John the Baptist, St Andrew Apostle, and St Lawrence (1586) and a Crucifixion (circa 1580) by Giovanni Maria Butteri.

An altarpiece depicting the Virgin and Child appear to St Francis was painted by Orazio Fidani. The wooden choir stalls in the apse of the church, as well as a large oak cabinet in the sacristy, were carved in the 17th-18th centuries.

The abbey's museum is found in the convent, built around a renaissance era courtyard. In this space are various rooms including the main hall (sala capitolare), the camarlingheria (room of the treasurer), the refectory, and the abbot's residence. The abbey was once associated with the poet Agnolo Firenzuola.

In the abbey museum are also an altarpiece depicting a Madonna of the Rosary (1594) by Vincenzo Dori; a copy of the Madonna of St Jerome by Correggio; and a Jesus says Farewell to his mother Mary by Giacinto Gimignani, moved here from Sofignano. There is also a 1236 baptismal fountain and ciborium, one from the studio of Antonio del Rossellino.
