= Villa Pazzi al Parugiano =

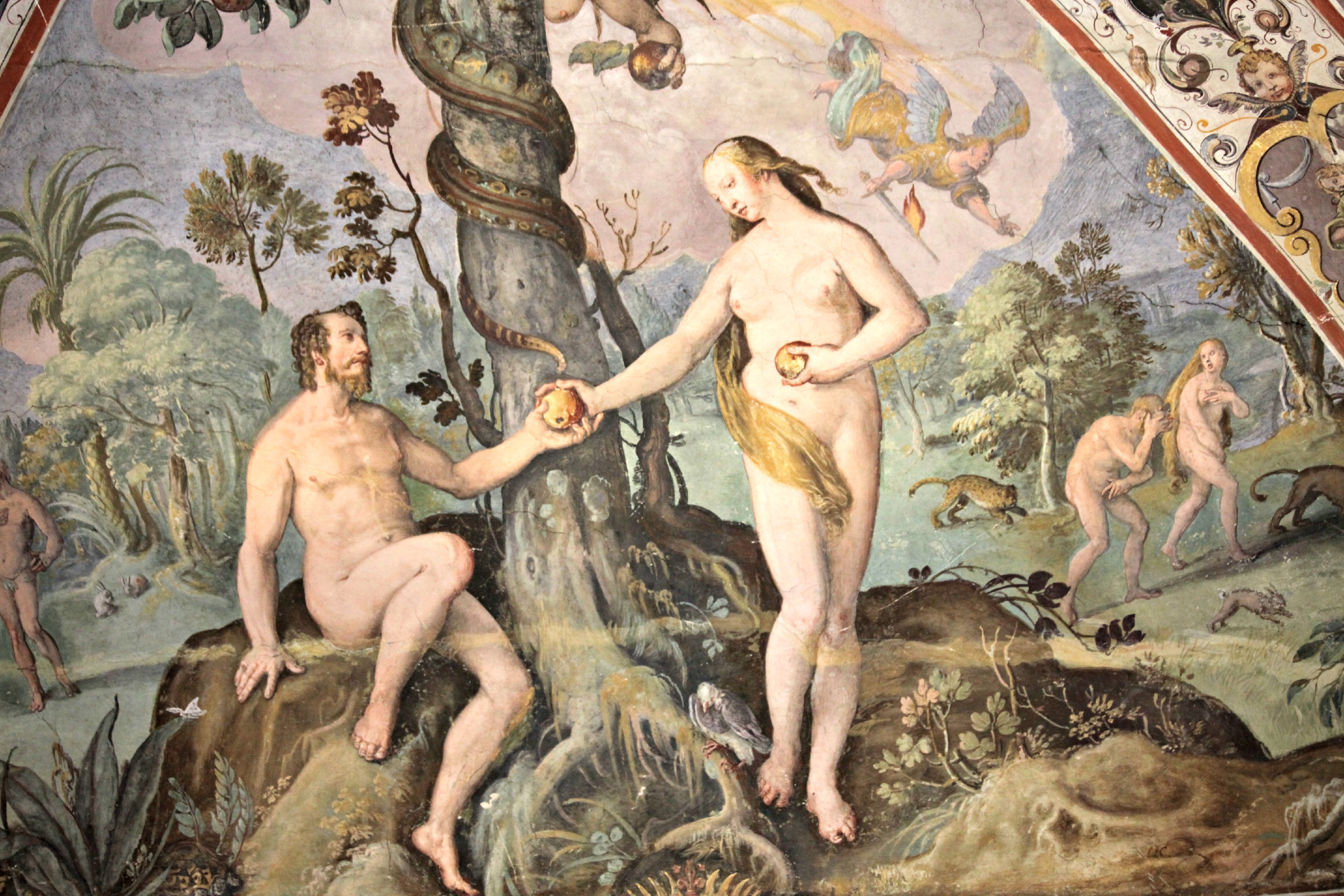
Original sin by Stradanus in the chapel, c. 1586

The Villa Pazzi al Parugiano is a Renaissance style, rural aristocratic palace located in the rural neighborhood or frazione of Bagnolo, located within the town limits of Montemurlo, province of Prato, region of Tuscany, Italy. The word Parugiano appears to be dialect for Paludano or Pantano, meaning swampy. The villa is now privately owned and rented out for cultural functions and celebrations.

The villa and the properties that are linked to it once belonged to the Pazzi family, which retained ownership until 1935 despite their affiliation with the attempted coup against the Medici. The property was purchased by the architect Adolfo Coppede. The former room of Saint Mary Magdalene de' Pazzi was converted into a chapel, and frescoed by the Flemish painter Stradanus between 1585 and 1587.
