= Meroni =

Meroni is an Italian surname. Notable people with the surname include:

- Andrea Meroni (born 1997), Italian football player
- Gigi Meroni (1943–1967), Italian football player
- Stefano Meroni (born 1982), Italian para-cyclist
- Teresa Meroni (1885–1951), Italian trade unionist
