= Villa del Barone =

Historic building in Montemurlo, province of Prato, Italy

Coordinates: 43.9343°N 11.0672°E

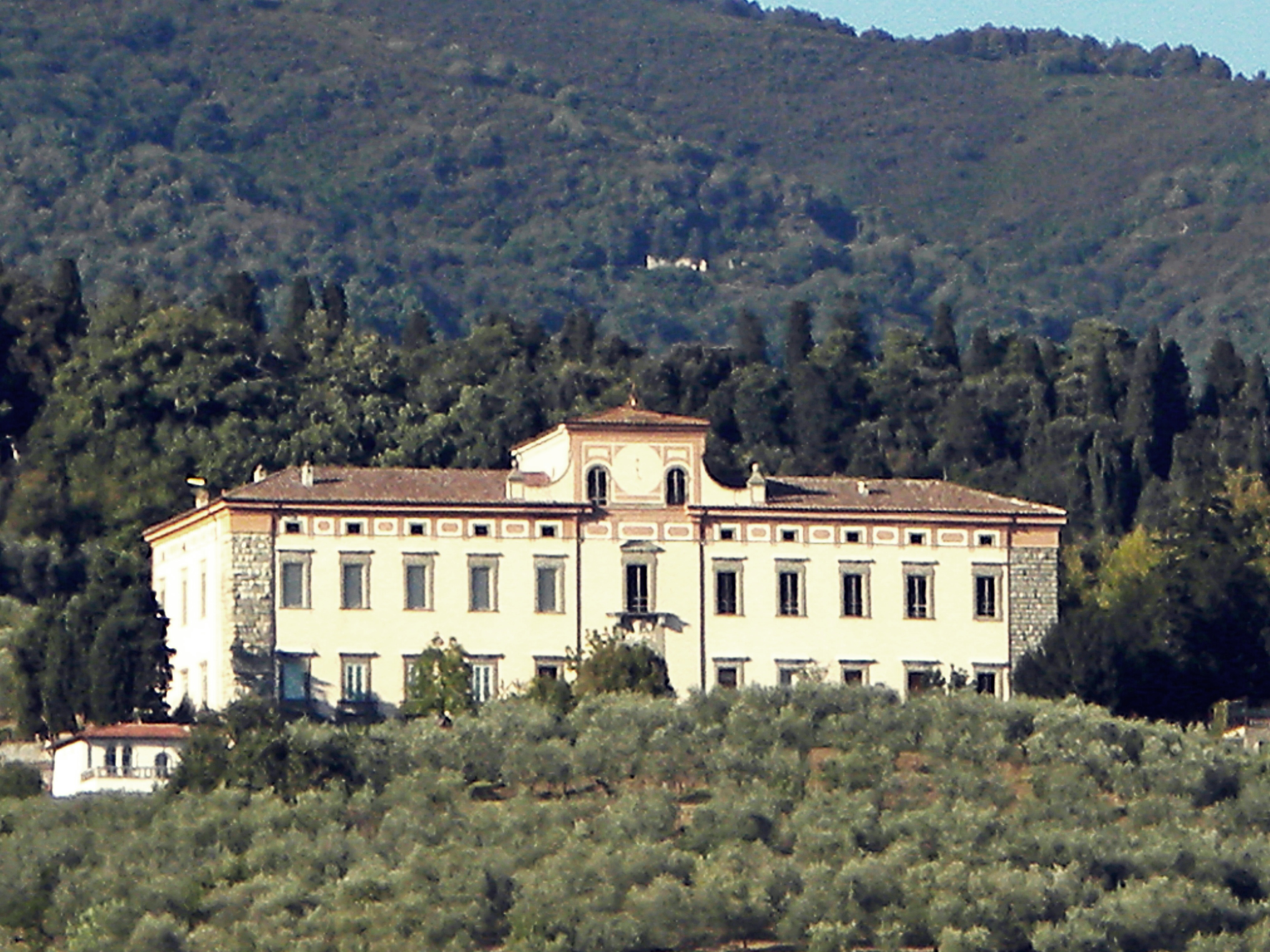

The Villa del Barone is a Renaissance style, rural aristocratic palace located in the rural neighborhood or frazione of Bagnolo di Sopra, located within the town limits of Montemurlo, province of Prato, region of Tuscany, Italy. The villa and the properties associated once belonged to the Tempi family, by the 16th century, it belonged to Baccio Valori, from whom it was confiscated by Cosimo de' Medici. Cosimo granted it to the Rossi family. Later belonged to Vettori family.
