= Massimo Logli =

Italian politician and etrepreneur (born 1956)

President of the Province of Prato
- In office 14 June 2004 – 23 June 2009
- Preceded by: Daniele Mannocci
- Succeeded by: Lamberto Nazzareno Gestri

Personal details
- Born: 10 September 1956 (age 70) Prato, Province of Florence, Italy
- Party: Christian Democracy; Italian People's Party; The Daisy
- Profession: Entrepreneur

Massimo Logli (born 10 September 1956) is an Italian politician and entrepreneur who served as president of the Province of Prato from 2004 to 2009.

He founded a self-named company specialising in systems and accessories for the installation and assembly of glass walls in 1989. In 2018, the company was acquired by Saint-Gobain, with Logli remaining as its managing director and general manager.

Logli began his political career in Prato in 1980 as a district councillor for the Christian Democracy. He later joined the Italian People's Party and served as a provincial councillor and as a member of the provincial executive from 1995 to 2004. In the 2004 provincial election, he was elected president of the Province of Prato with 55.1% of the vote as the candidate of a centre-left coalition.
