= Ilaria Bugetti =

Italian politician (born 1973)

Mayor of Prato
- In office 13 June 2024 – 11 July 2025
- Preceded by: Matteo Biffoni
- Succeeded by: Matteo Biffoni

Member of the Regional Council of Tuscany
- In office 17 June 2015 – 25 June 2024

Mayor of Cantagallo
- In office 14 June 2004 – 26 May 2014
- Preceded by: Riccardo Turchi
- Succeeded by: Guglielmo Bongiorno

Personal details
- Born: 9 November 1973 (age 52) Prato, Italy
- Party: Democrats of the Left; Democratic Party
- Education: University of Florence

Ilaria Bugetti (born 9 November 1973) is an Italian politician who served as a member of the Regional Council of Tuscany (2015–2024) and mayor of Prato (2024–2025).

== Life and career ==
Bugetti graduated in political sciences from the Cesare Alfieri Institute of the University of Florence. She joined the Democrats of the Left at its founding, being elected in 1999 as a municipal councilor of Cantagallo, a municipality of which she later served as mayor from 2004 to 2014.

In 2010, she was elected secretary of the Prato provincial section of the Democratic Party, a role she held until the end of 2013.

In the 2015 Tuscan regional election, Bugetti was elected as a member of the Regional Council of Tuscany with the Democratic Party, and was subsequently re-elected in the 2020 election.

In 2024, Bugetti became the official candidate of the center-left coalition for the position of mayor of Prato, supported by the Democratic Party, the Five Star Movement, Green and Left Alliance, and More Europe, as well as other civic lists. She won at the first round with 52.22% of the votes. On 13 June 2024, she was sworn in as mayor of Prato; she is the first woman to hold this position.

On 20 June 2025, following investigations into her for corruption by the Florence Public Prosecutor's Office, Bugetti announced her intention to resign from the office of mayor. Her resignation became effective on 10 July 2025.

Political offices
Preceded by Matteo Biffoni	Mayor of Prato; 2024–2025	Succeeded by Matteo Biffoni
