= Matteo Biffoni =

Italian politician

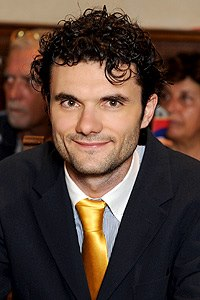

Mayor of Prato
- Incumbent
- Assumed office 29 May 2026
- Preceded by: Ilaria Bugetti
- In office 28 May 2014 – 13 June 2024
- Preceded by: Roberto Cenni
- Succeeded by: Ilaria Bugetti

Member of the Regional Council of Tuscany
- In office 29 October 2025 – 23 June 2026
- Constituency: Prato

President of the Province of Prato
- In office 12 October 2014 – 31 October 2018
- Preceded by: Lamberto Nazzareno Gestri
- Succeeded by: Francesco Puggelli

Member of the Chamber of Deputies
- In office 15 March 2013 – 9 July 2014
- Constituency: Tuscany

Personal details
- Born: 19 May 1974 (age 52) Prato, Tuscany, Italy
- Party: DS (2004-2007); PD (since 2007)
- Education: University of Florence
- Profession: Lawyer

Matteo Biffoni (born 19 May 1974) is an Italian politician, member of the Democratic Party.

In 2013, Biffoni was elected to the Chamber of Deputies. He served as president of the Province of Prato from 2014 to 2018 and has served as mayor of Prato from May 2014 to 2019 for the first term, and from 2019 to 2024 for the second term.

In 2025, Biffoni was elected to the Regional Council of Tuscany. In May 2026, he was elected mayor of Prato for the third time.

== Biography ==
In the 2004 local elections, he ran for a seat on the Prato City Council as part of the Democrats of the Left (DS) slate in support of center-left mayoral candidate Marco Romagnoli, and was elected to the city council.

In 2007, he supported the dissolution of the DS, as ratified by that year’s party convention, and its merger into the Democratic Party (Italy) (PD), where he became a member of the Provincial Assembly and the Provincial Executive Committee, and was re-elected as a city councilor in the 2009 local elections.

In 2012, he supported the candidacy of Florence Mayor Matteo Renzi in the center-left primary elections of “Italia. Bene Comune.”

== See also ==
- 2014 Italian local elections
- 2019 Italian local elections
- 2026 Italian local elections
- List of mayors of Prato

Political offices
Preceded by Roberto Cenni	Mayor of Prato; 2014-2024	Succeeded by Ilaria Bugetti
Preceded by Lamberto Nazzareno Gestri	President of the Province of Prato; 2014-2016	Succeeded by Francesco Puggelli
Preceded by Ilaria Bugetti	Mayor of Prato since 2026	Incumbent
