= Francesco Puggelli =

Italian politician (born 1982)

President of the Province of Prato
- In office 31 October 2018 – 26 November 2022
- Preceded by: Matteo Biffoni
- Succeeded by: Simone Calamai

Mayor of Poggio a Caiano
- In office 11 June 2018 – 16 May 2023
- Preceded by: Marco Martini
- Succeeded by: Riccardo Palandri

Personal details
- Born: 11 October 1982 (age 43) Florence, Italy
- Party: Democratic Party
- Education: University of Florence
- Occupation: Physician

Francesco Puggelli (born 11 October 1982) is an Italian physician and politician who served as president of the Province of Prato from 2018 to 2022.

== Life and career ==
Born in Florence in 1982, Puggelli graduated in medicine from the University of Florence in 2008 and began working as a physician at the Meyer Children's Hospital in 2015.

In 2003, he was elected to the municipal council of Poggio a Caiano, in the province of Prato, as a centre-left candidate. He was re-elected in 2008 and, from 2013, served as assessor and deputy mayor. In June 2018, he was elected mayor of Poggio a Caiano.

In October 2018, Puggelli was elected president of the Province of Prato with the Democratic Party.

In 2023, Puggelli lost his bid for re-election as mayor of Poggio a Caiano to centre-right candidate Riccardo Palandri, who won with 50.74% of the vote against Puggelli's 49.26%. Puggelli was nevertheless elected to the municipal council as leader of the opposition, but later resigned his seat in June 2025.

Since June 2025, Puggelli has served as director of San Luca Hospital in Lucca.
