= Daniele Mannocci =

Italian politician

President of the Province of Prato
- In office 8 May 1995 – 14 June 2004
- Preceded by: Office established
- Succeeded by: Massimo Logli

Personal details
- Born: 14 November 1957 (age 68) Prato, Province of Florence, Italy
- Party: Independent (centre-left)

Daniele Mannocci (born 14 November 1957) is an Italian politician who served as the first president of the Province of Prato from 1995 to 2004.

== Life and career ==
Born in Prato in 1957, Mannocci worked as an official for the local savings bank Cassa di Risparmio di Prato and served for ten years as secretary of the Prato branch of the Italian Confederation of Workers' Trade Unions (CISL).

At the 1995 provincial elections, the first held for the newly established Province of Prato, he was a candidate for president, supported by the civic list "Progetto Democratico" (which included the Democratic Party of the Left), the Italian People's Party, and the Pact of the Democrats. After obtaining 48% of the vote in the first round, Mannocci won the runoff with 68.2% against 31.8% for the centre-right candidate Goffredo Borchi.

Mannocci was re-elected at the 1999 provincial elections, winning in the first round with 50.8% of the vote.

In 2004 he was elected to the Prato City Council for The Daisy and served as president of the City Council until June 2009.
