= Lamberto Nazzareno Gestri =

Italian politician (born 1942)

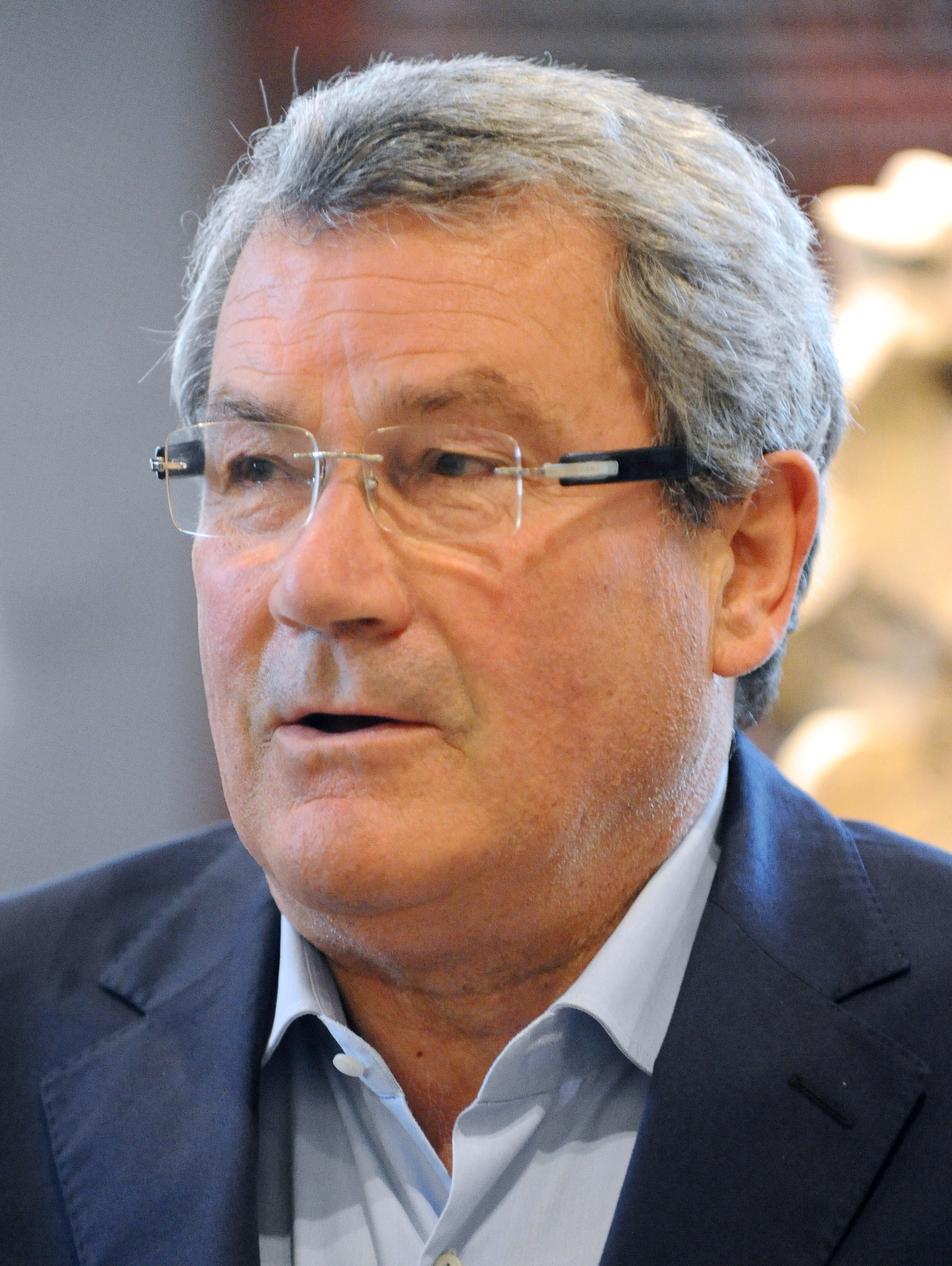
- Gestri in 2013

President of the Province of Prato
- In office 23 June 2009 – 12 October 2014
- Preceded by: Massimo Logli
- Succeeded by: Matteo Biffoni

Personal details
- Born: 15 February 1942 (age 84) Prato, Province of Florence, Kingdom of Italy
- Party: Christian Democracy; Italian People's Party; The Daisy; Democratic Party
- Education: University of Florence
- Profession: Civil engineer

Lamberto Nazzareno Gestri (born 15 February 1942) is an Italian politician and civil engineer who served as president of the Province of Prato from 2009 to 2014.

== Life and career ==
Gestri worked as a civil engineer. He also served as vice-president of Consiag and as a member of the board of directors of Estra, an energy and public services company.

Gestri began his political career in the Christian Democracy, serving as a city councillor in Prato and provincial secretary of the party from 1979 to 1988. In 1994, he joined the Italian People's Party, and later the Daisy, becoming its provincial coordinator. He became a member of the Democratic Party in 2007.

In the 2009 provincial election, Gestri was elected president of the Province of Prato after defeating Cristina Attucci in the runoff, receiving 50.85% of the vote to Attucci's 49.15%. He was supported by a centre-left coalition comprising the Democratic Party, Italy of Values, Left Ecology Freedom and the Party of Italian Communists. He served until October 2014.
