= Simone Calamai =

Italian politician (born 1979)

President of the Province of Prato
- Incumbent
- Assumed office 26 November 2022
- Preceded by: Francesco Puggelli

Mayor of Montemurlo
- Incumbent
- Assumed office 29 May 2019
- Preceded by: Mauro Lorenzini

Personal details
- Born: 22 December 1979 (age 46) Prato, Tuscany, Italy
- Party: Democratic Party

Simone Calamai (born 22 December 1979) is an Italian politician serving as president of the Province of Prato since 2022. He has also served as mayor of Montemurlo since 2019.

Calamai was elected to the Montemurlo municipal council in 2004 with the Democrats of the Left and served as an assessor from 2009 and deputy mayor from 2014. He was elected mayor of Montemurlo for the Democratic Party in 2019 with 59.9% of the vote and was re-elected in 2024.

In November 2022, Calamai was elected president of the Province of Prato.
