= Roberto Cenni =

Italian politician

Mayor of Prato
- In office 24 June 2009 – 28 May 2014
- Preceded by: Marco Romagnoli
- Succeeded by: Matteo Biffoni

Personal details
- Born: 14 September 1972 (age 53) Prato, Tuscany, Italy
- Party: The People of Freedom (2009-2013); Forza Italia (since 2013)
- Profession: entrepreneur

Roberto Cenni (born 14 September 1972 in Prato) is an Italian politician.

He is a member of the centre-right party Forza Italia and served as Mayor of Prato from June 2009 to May 2014.

== See also ==
- 2009 Italian local elections
- List of mayors of Prato

Political offices
Preceded by Marco Romagnoli	Mayor of Prato; 2009–2014	Succeeded by Matteo Biffoni
