= Goffredo Lohengrin Landini =

Italian politician (1927–2002)

Mayor of Prato
- In office 1975–1985
- Preceded by: Giorgio Vestri
- Succeeded by: Alessandro Lucarini

Member of the Regional Council of Tuscany
- In office 22 May 1985 – 21 March 1990

Personal details
- Born: 15 June 1927 Prato, Province of Florence, Kingdom of Italy
- Died: 21 December 2002 (aged 75) Prato, Tuscany, Italy
- Party: Italian Communist Party
- Occupation: Civil servant

Goffredo Lohengrin Landini (15 June 1927 – 21 December 2002) was an Italian politician who served as mayor of Prato from 1975 to 1985 and as a member of the Regional Council of Tuscany from 1985 to 1990.

== Life and career ==
Born in Prato, Landini worked as a civil servant and joined the Italian Communist Party (PCI) in 1944. He was first elected to the Prato City Council in 1951 and later served as municipal assessor before becoming mayor of the city in 1975.

As mayor, Landini promoted Prato's industrial expansion and cultural development, supporting projects such as the industrial districts, the future freight village, Prato Expo, and the Luca Ronconi's Theatre Laboratory. He also promoted the preservation of Prato's historical heritage, commissioning French historian Fernand Braudel to oversee the preparation of the multi-volume History of Prato (Prato, storia di una città).

From 1970 to 1975, he was secretary of the PCI federation of Prato. During his tenure as mayor, he also served as regional president of the National Association of Italian Municipalities (ANCI) from 1975 to 1983 and was a member of its national executive bureau.

In 1985, he was elected to the Regional Council of Tuscany as a PCI candidate in the Florence constituency. He was elected with 8,015 preference votes. During his term, he served on the Land Use and Territorial Planning Committee.

He died in Prato on 21 December 2002, aged 75.

In 2017, a square in Prato was named after Landini in recognition of his service as mayor.
