= Montemurlo =

- Comune
- Comune di Montemurlo
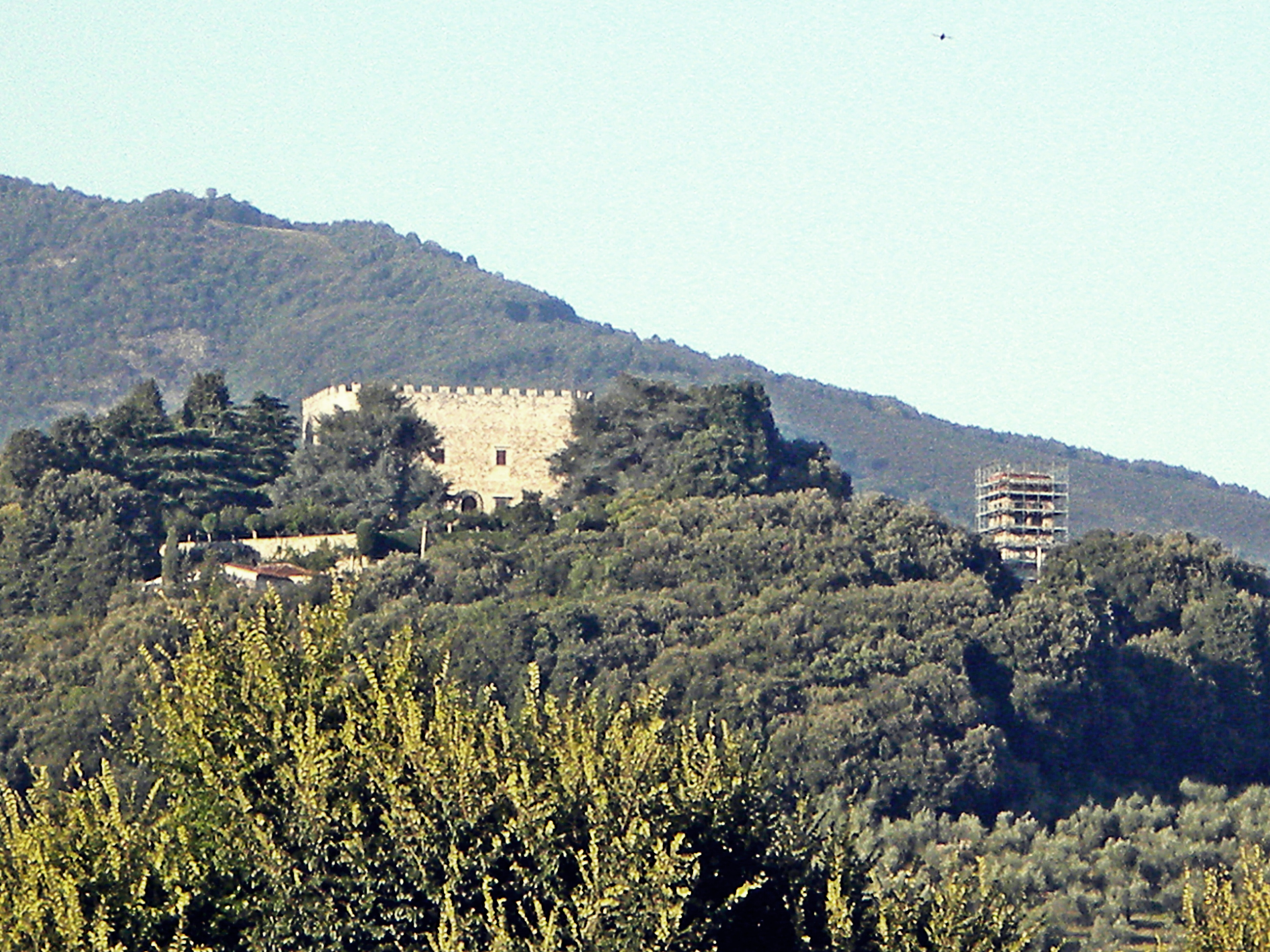
- The Montemurlo fortress

- Location within Italy Location within Tuscany
- Coordinates: 43°56′N 11°2′E
- Country: Italy
- Region: Tuscany
- Province: Prato (PO)
- Frazioni: Albiano, Bagnolo, Fornacelle, Oste, Bagnolo di Sopra, Campi Solari, Javello, Borgo Forte, Freccioni, Guzzano, La Gualchiera, Popolesco, Santorezzo

Government
  - Mayor: Simone Calamai

Area
  - Total: 30.77 km^{2} (11.88 sq mi)
- Elevation: 73 m (240 ft)

Population (2025)
  - Total: 19,059
  - Density: 619.4/km^{2} (1,604/sq mi)
- Demonym: Montemurlesi
- Time zone: UTC+1 (CET)
  - Summer (DST): UTC+2 (CEST)
- Postal code: 59013
- Dialing code: 0574
- Website: Official website

Montemurlo (Italian pronunciation: [monteˈmurlo]) is a comune (municipality) in the Province of Prato in the Italian region Tuscany, located about 25 kilometres (16 mi) northwest of Florence and about 8 kilometres (5 mi) northwest of Prato. It has 19,059 inhabitants.

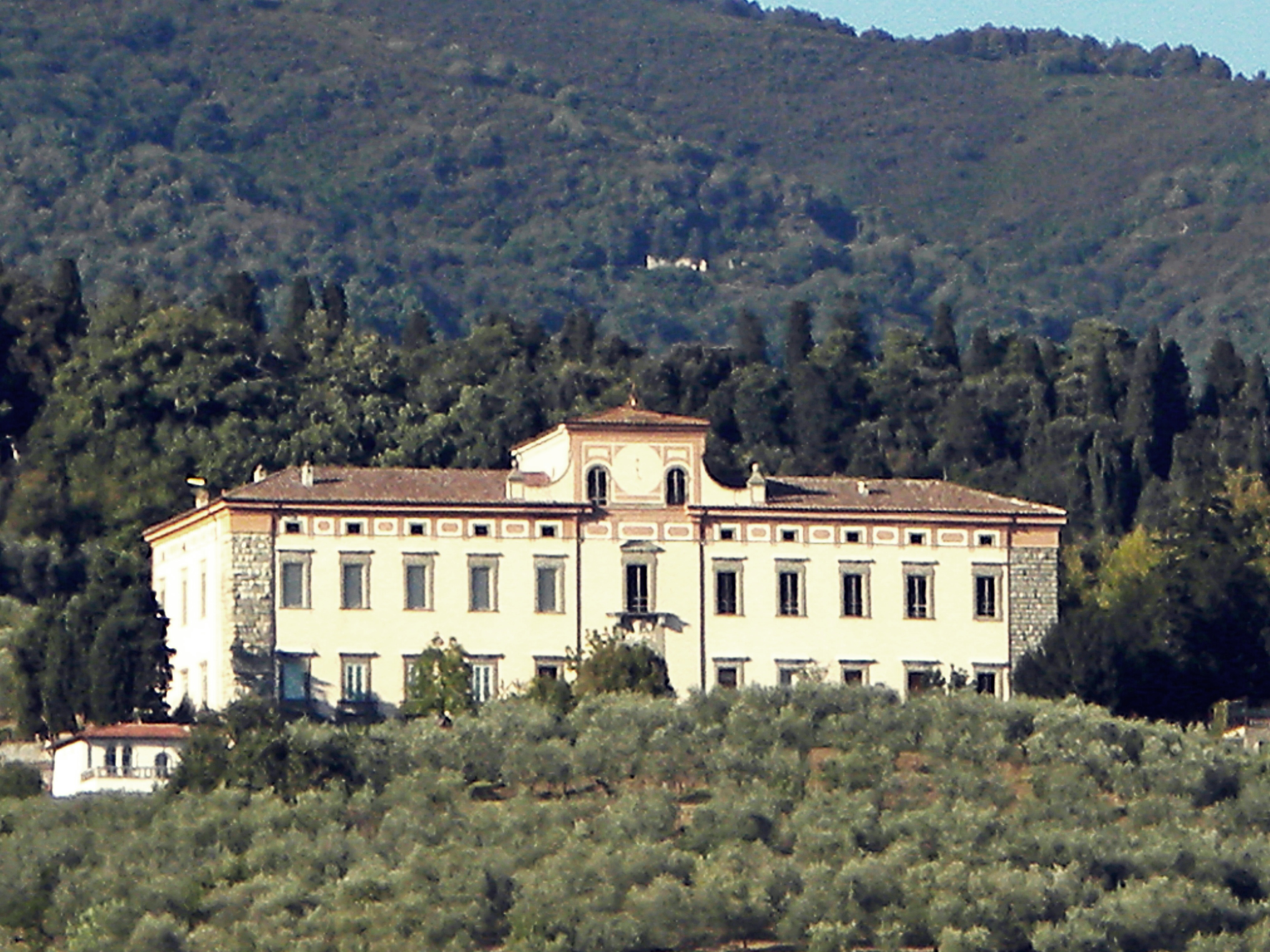
Villa del Barone in Bagnolo di Sopra.

Montemurlo borders the following municipalities: Agliana, Cantagallo, Montale, Prato, Vaiano.

== Demographics ==
Historical population

Year	Pop.	±%
1861	2,442	—
1871	2,781	+13.9%
1881	2,773	−0.3%
1901	3,294	+18.8%
1911	3,380	+2.6%
1921	3,397	+0.5%
1931	3,370	−0.8%
1936	3,358	−0.4%

Year	Pop.	±%
1951	3,405	+1.4%
1961	4,403	+29.3%
1971	9,698	+120.3%
1981	15,632	+61.2%
1991	17,164	+9.8%
2001	17,502	+2.0%
2011	17,908	+2.3%
2021	19,100	+6.7%

Source: ISTAT

== Sights ==
=== Churches ===
- Chapel at Javello farm
- Chapel at the fortress in Montemurlo
- Chapel at Villa del Barone in Bagnolo di Sopra
- Chapel at Villa Giamari in Fornacelle
- Parish Church of San Giovanni Battista Decollato at Montemurlo castle
- Sacred Heart of Jesus in Montemurlo
- San Pietro in Albiano
- Santa Maria Maddalena de' Pazzi in Bagnolo
- Holy Mary Mother of the Church in Oste
- Holy Mary Mother of God in Fornacelle

=== Villas ===
- Old Village Riva di Bagnolo in Bagnolo di Sopra
- Casone dei Valori in Montemurlo castle
- Javello farm
- Palarciano farm in Montemurlo
- The Fortress in Montemurlo castle
- Villa del Barone
- Villa Bresci in Bagnoli di Sopra
- Villa in Campi Solari
- Villa di Galceto in Bagnolo
- Villa di Popolesco in Popolesco
- Villa Gherardini in Montemurlo
- Villa Giamari in Fornacelle
- Villa Melchi in Borgo Forte
- Villa Pazzi al Parugiano
- Villa Strozzi in Bagnolo

== Sport ==
- A.S.D. Jolly Montemurlo
