= List of mayors of Prato =

Mayor of Prato
- Sindaco di Prato

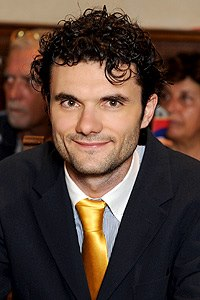
- Incumbent; Matteo Biffoni (PD) since 29 May 2026
- Appointer: Popular election
- Term length: 5 years, renewable once
- Formation: 1865
- Website: Official website

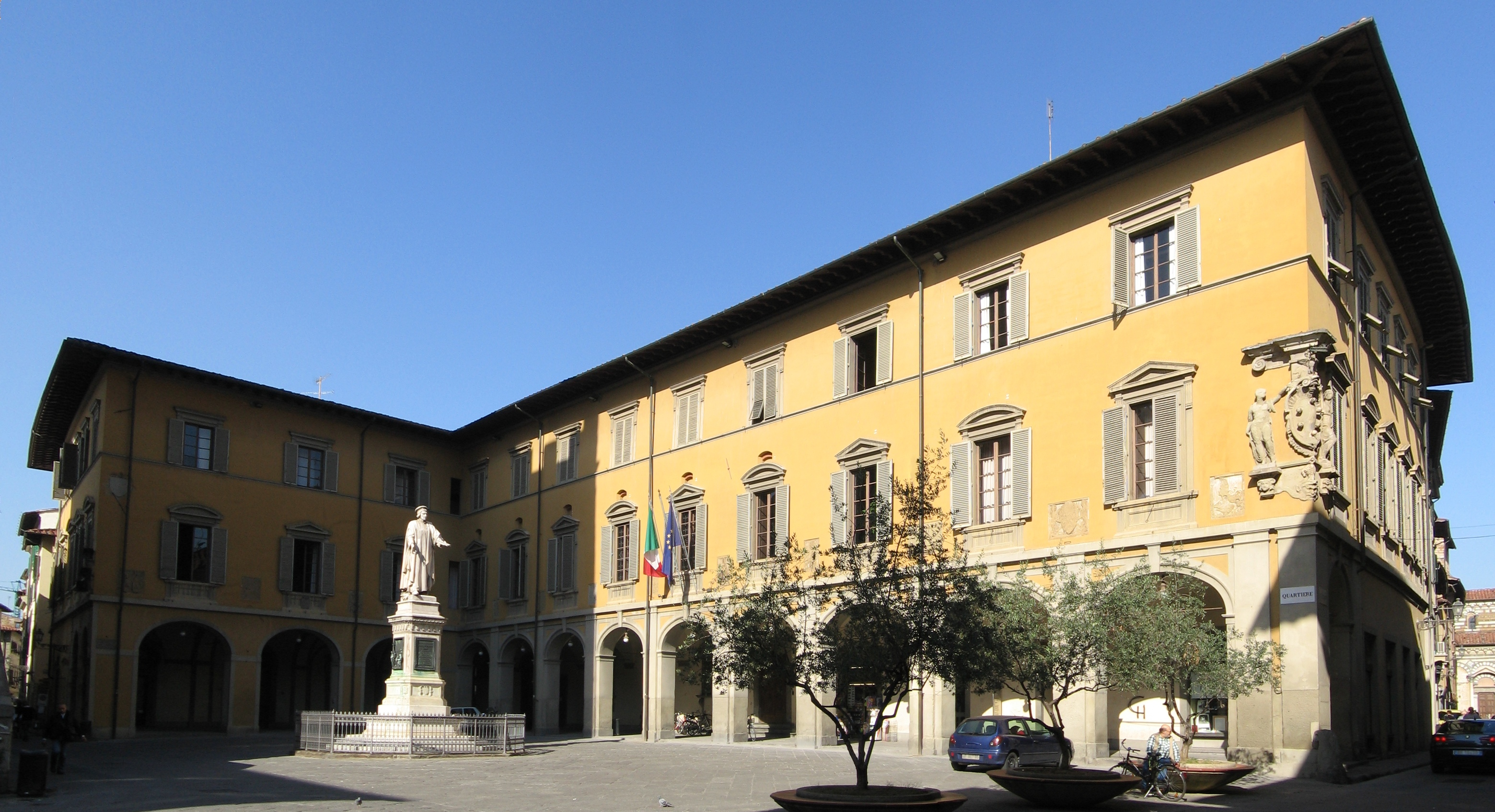
Prato's City Hall.

The mayor of Prato is an elected politician who, along with the Prato's city council, is accountable for the strategic government of Prato in Tuscany, Italy.

The current mayor is Matteo Biffoni (PD), who took office on 29 May 2026.

== Overview ==
According to the Italian Constitution, the mayor of Prato is member of the city council.

The mayor is elected by the population of Prato, who also elect the members of the city council, controlling the mayor's policy guidelines and is able to enforce his resignation by a motion of no confidence. The mayor is entitled to appoint and release the members of his government.

Since 1995 the mayor is elected directly by Prato's electorate: in all mayoral elections in Italy in cities with a population higher than 15,000 the voters express a direct choice for the mayor or an indirect choice voting for the party of the candidate's coalition. If no candidate receives at least 50% of votes, the top two candidates go to a second round after two weeks. The election of the city council is based on a direct choice for the candidate with a preference vote: the candidate with the majority of the preferences is elected. The number of the seats for each party is determined proportionally.

== Italian Republic (since 1946) ==
=== City Council election (1946–1995) ===
From 1946 to 1995, the mayor of Prato was elected by the city council.

	Mayor	Term start	Term end	Party
1	Alfredo Menichetti	1946	1948	PCI
2	Roberto Giovannini	1948	1965	PCI
3	Giorgio Vestri	1965	1975	PCI
4	Goffredo Lohengrin Landini	1975	1985	PCI
5	Alessandro Lucarini	1985	2 June 1989	PCI
6	Claudio Martini	2 June 1989	24 April 1995	PCI

=== Direct election (since 1995) ===
Since 1995, under provisions of new local administration law, the mayor of Prato is chosen by direct election, originally every four, than every five years.

	Mayor	Term start	Term end	Party	Coalition	Election
7	Fabrizio Mattei	24 April 1995	14 June 1999	PDS; DS	PDS • PPI • Dem • FdV	1995
7	Fabrizio Mattei	14 June 1999	14 June 2004	PDS; DS	DS • PPI • PdCI • Dem	1999
8	Marco Romagnoli	14 June 2004	24 June 2009	DS; PD	DS • DL • PdCI • IdV • FdV	2004
9	Roberto Cenni	24 June 2009	28 May 2014	PdL	PdL • LN • UDC	2009
10	Matteo Biffoni	28 May 2014	11 June 2019	PD	PD	2014
10	Matteo Biffoni	11 June 2019	13 June 2024	PD	PD	2019
11	Ilaria Bugetti	13 June 2024	11 July 2025 (Note: Resigned.)	PD	PD • AVS • M5S	2024
Special Prefectural Commissioner tenure (11 July 2025 – 29 May 2026)
(10)	Matteo Biffoni	29 May 2026	Incumbent	PD	PD • AVS • IV	2026

== See also ==
- Timeline of Prato

== Bibliography ==
- Fasano Guarini, Elena (1997). Prato, storia di una città. Prato: Comune di Prato.
