= Roberto Giovannini =

Italian politician (1918–1995)

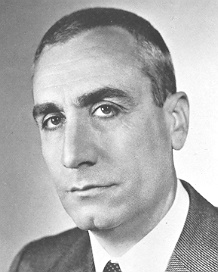

Mayor of Prato
- In office 1948–1965
- Preceded by: Alfredo Menichetti
- Succeeded by: Giorgio Vestri

Member of the Chamber of Deputies
- In office 9 July 1968 – 4 July 1976

Personal details
- Born: 8 July 1918 Prato, Province of Florence, Kingdom of Italy
- Died: 14 November 1995 (aged 77)
- Party: Italian Communist Party

Roberto Giovannini (8 July 1918 – 14 November 1995) was an Italian politician who served as mayor of Prato (1948–1965) and as a member of the Chamber of Deputies (1968–1976).
