= Vaiano =

- Comune
- Comune di Vaiano
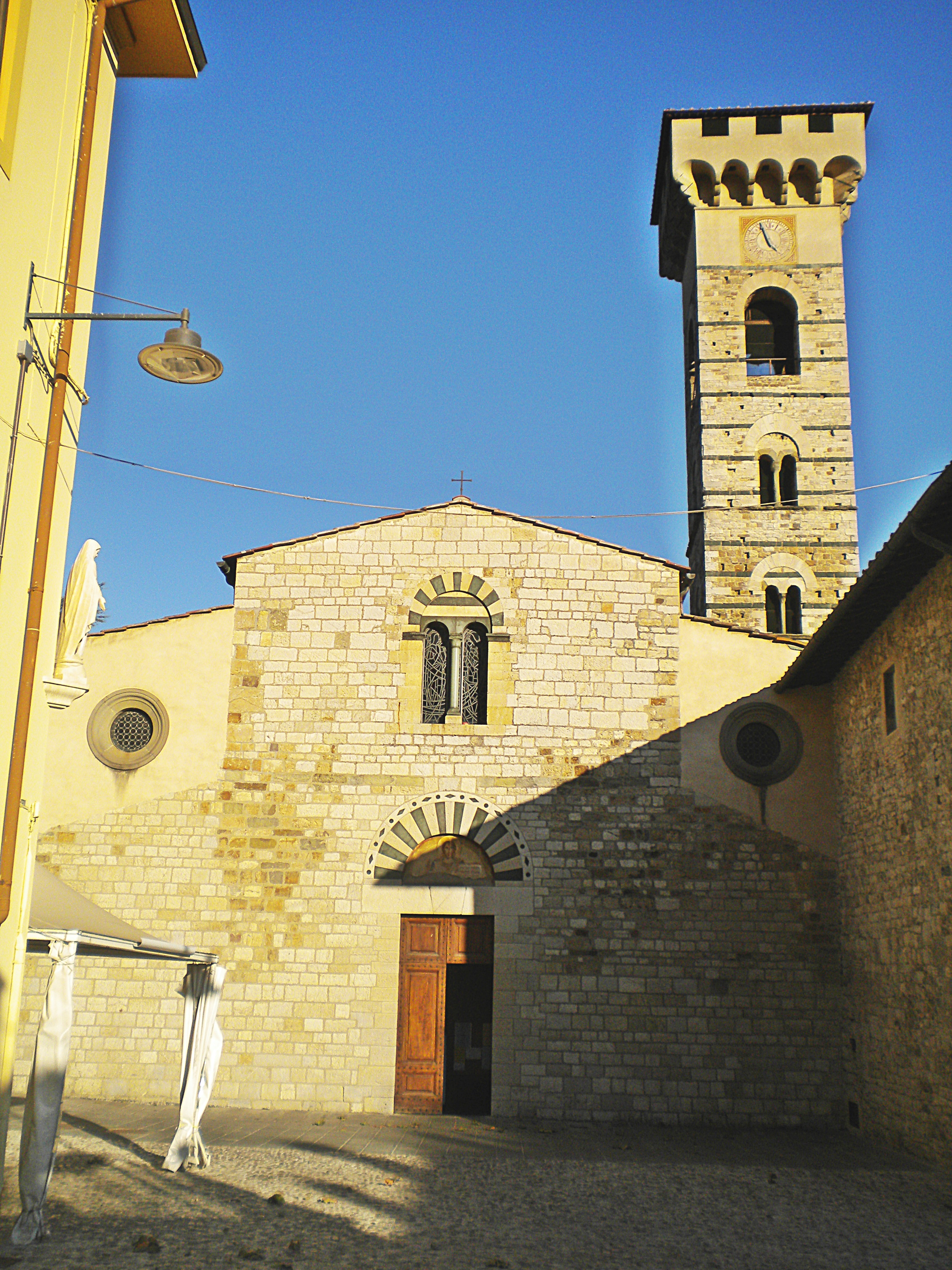
- San salvatore Abbey-Facade in Vaiano

- Location within Italy Location within Tuscany
- Coordinates: 43°58′N 11°7′E
- Country: Italy
- Region: Tuscany
- Province: Province of Prato (PO)
- Frazioni: Fabio, Faltugnano, Gamberame, La Briglia, La Cartaia, La Foresta, La Tignamica, Le Fornaci, Meretto, Parmigno, Popigliano, Savignano, San Leonardo in Collina, Schignano and Sofignano.

Area
  - Total: 34.11 km^{2} (13.17 sq mi)
- Elevation: 150 m (490 ft)

Population (2025)
  - Total: 9,912
  - Density: 290.6/km^{2} (752.6/sq mi)
- Demonym: Vaianesi
- Time zone: UTC+1 (CET)
  - Summer (DST): UTC+2 (CEST)
- Postal code: 59021
- Dialing code: 0574
- Website: Official website

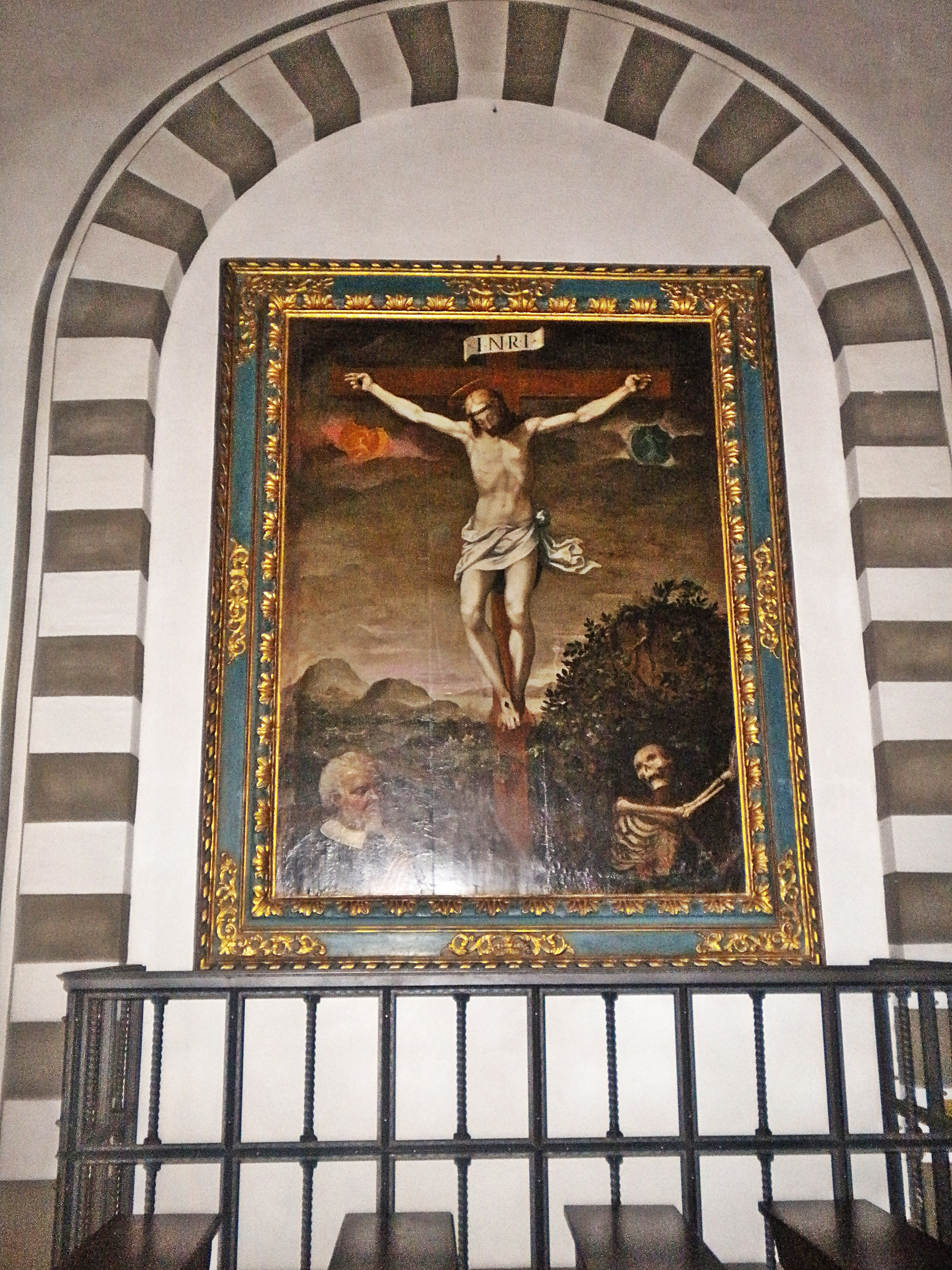
San salvatore Abbey-Cricifix in Vaiano

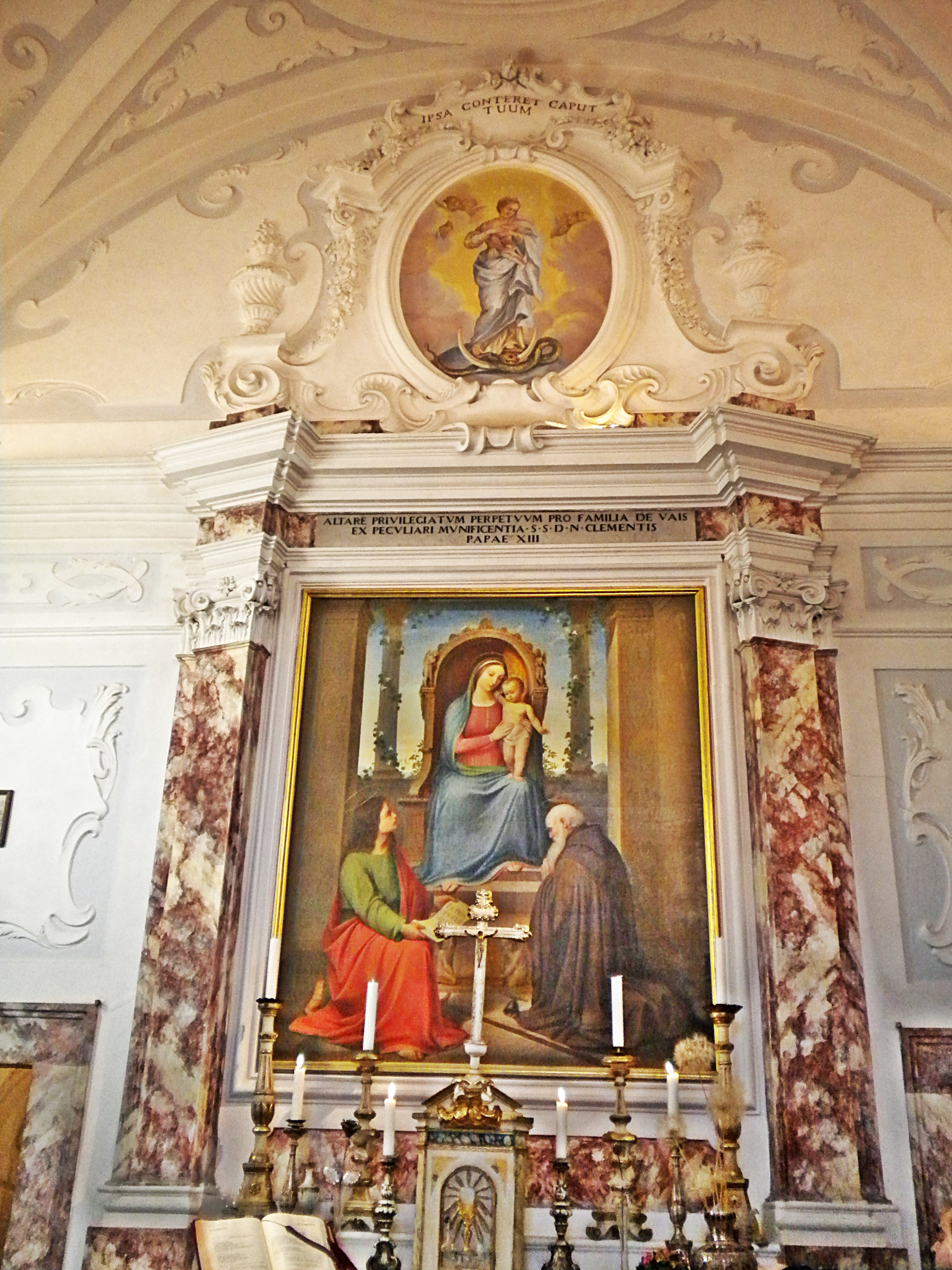
Antonio Marini, The Madonna with child between Saint Joseph and Saint Anthon from Padua-Oratory of Saint Anthon at Villa Vai (Il Mulinaccio)

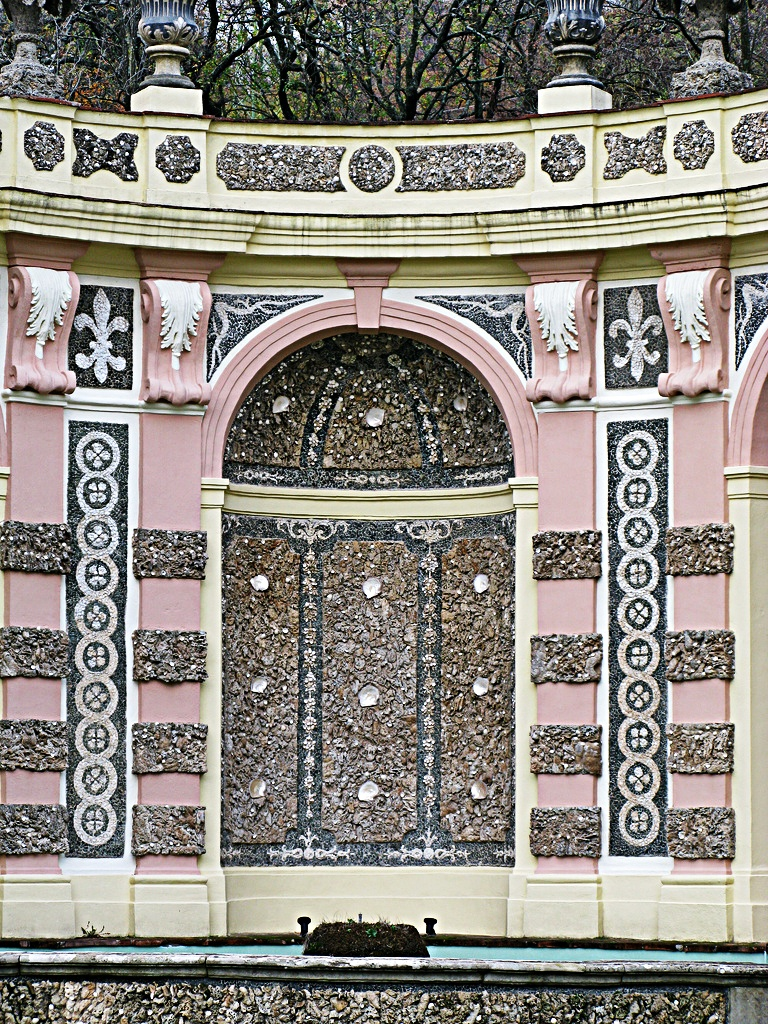
Ninfeus at Villa Vai (Il Mulinaccio)

Vaiano is a comune (municipality) in the Province of Prato in the region of Tuscany in Italy. It is located about 25 kilometres (16 mi) northwest of Florence and about 10 kilometres (6 mi) north of Prato. It has 9,912 inhabitants.

== Geography ==
The municipality of Vaiano contains the frazioni (subdivisions, mainly villages and hamlets) Fabio, Faltugnano, Gamberame, La Briglia, La Cartaia, La Foresta, La Tignamica, Le Fornaci, Meretto, Parmigno, Popigliano, Savignano, San Leonardo in Collina, Schignano and Sofignano.

Vaiano borders the following municipalities: Barberino di Mugello, Calenzano, Cantagallo, Montemurlo, Prato.

== Demographics ==
Historical population

| Year | Pop. | ±% |
|---|---|---|
| 1861 | 2,588 | — |
| 1871 | 2,922 | +12.9% |
| 1881 | 3,085 | +5.6% |
| 1901 | 6,414 | +107.9% |
| 1911 | 5,008 | −21.9% |
| 1921 | 5,298 | +5.8% |
| 1931 | 5,805 | +9.6% |
| 1936 | 5,844 | +0.7% |

| Year | Pop. | ±% |
|---|---|---|
| 1951 | 6,281 | +7.5% |
| 1961 | 6,883 | +9.6% |
| 1971 | 7,115 | +3.4% |
| 1981 | 7,947 | +11.7% |
| 1991 | 8,848 | +11.3% |
| 2001 | 9,051 | +2.3% |
| 2011 | 9,821 | +8.5% |
| 2021 | 9,943 | +1.2% |

Source: ISTAT

== Architecture ==
=== Churches ===
- San Salvatore Abbey, Vaiano in Vaiano
- Chapel at the old cemetery in Vaiano
- San Leonardo in Gamberame
- San Leonardo in San leonardo in Collina
- Chapel at the Fattoria delle Mura in Sofignano
- Chapel at Villa Buonamici in San Gaudenzio
- Saint Anthon oratory at Villa Vai Il Mulinaccio
- San Pier Giuliano oratory in La Cartaia
- Ex Church of San Leonardo in Case
- San Martino in Fabio
- San Martino in Schignano
- San Miniato in La Briglia
- San Miniato in Popigliano
- Santi Andrea e Donato in Savignano
- Santi Giusto e Clemente in Faltugnano
- Santi Vito e Modesto in Sofignano
- Santo Stefano in Parmigno

=== Villas ===
- Villa vai al Mulinaccio
- Villa del Bello
- Villa Hall or Villa Strozzi in Meretto
- Villa Buonamici in San Gaudenzio
- Villa Buonamici in Savignano
- Villa Fabbri Fattoria delle Mura in Sofignano

== Feasts ==
- Carnival in Vaiano February
- Feast of the dust in Sofignano may
- More events during the year in Villa Vai

== Notable people ==
- Teresa Meroni (1885 – 1951), worker, trade unionist, and socialist

== Gallery ==
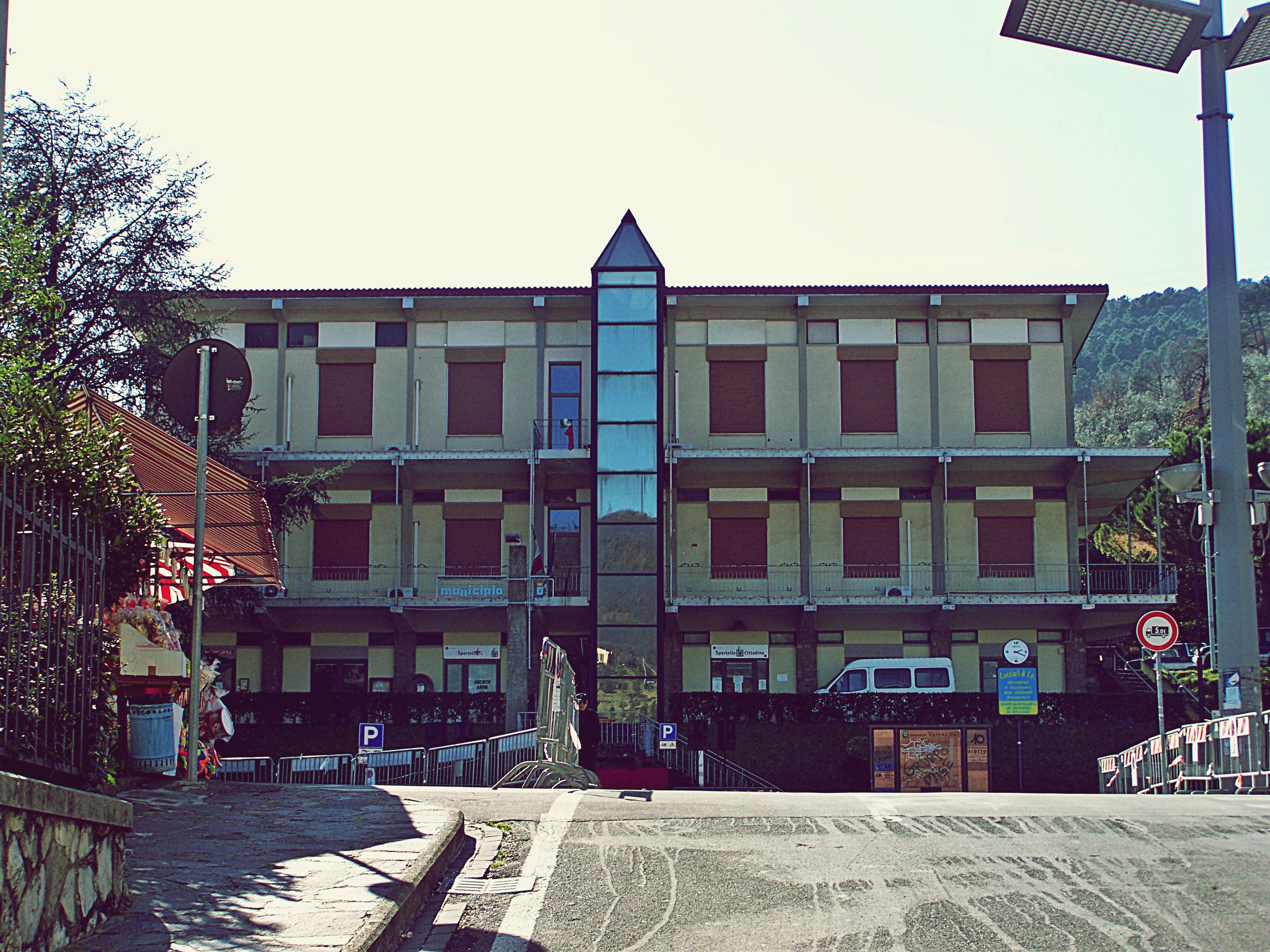
Town hall in Vaiano

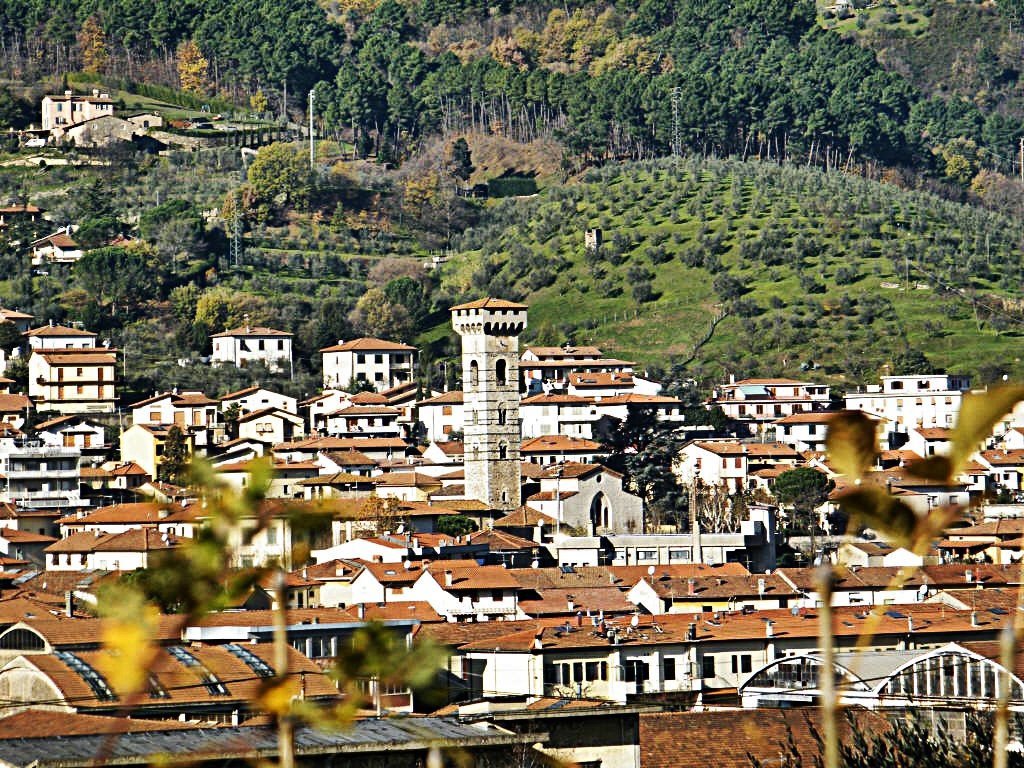
Vaiano view

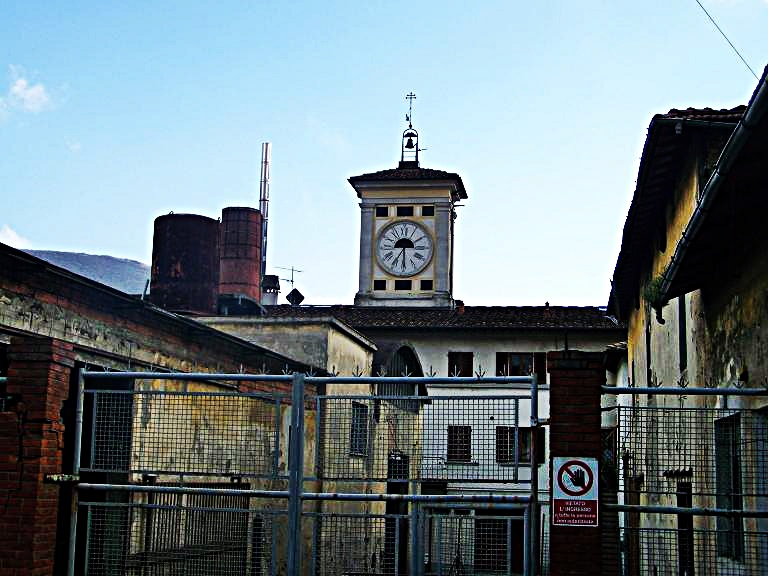
Forti manifactury in La Briglia

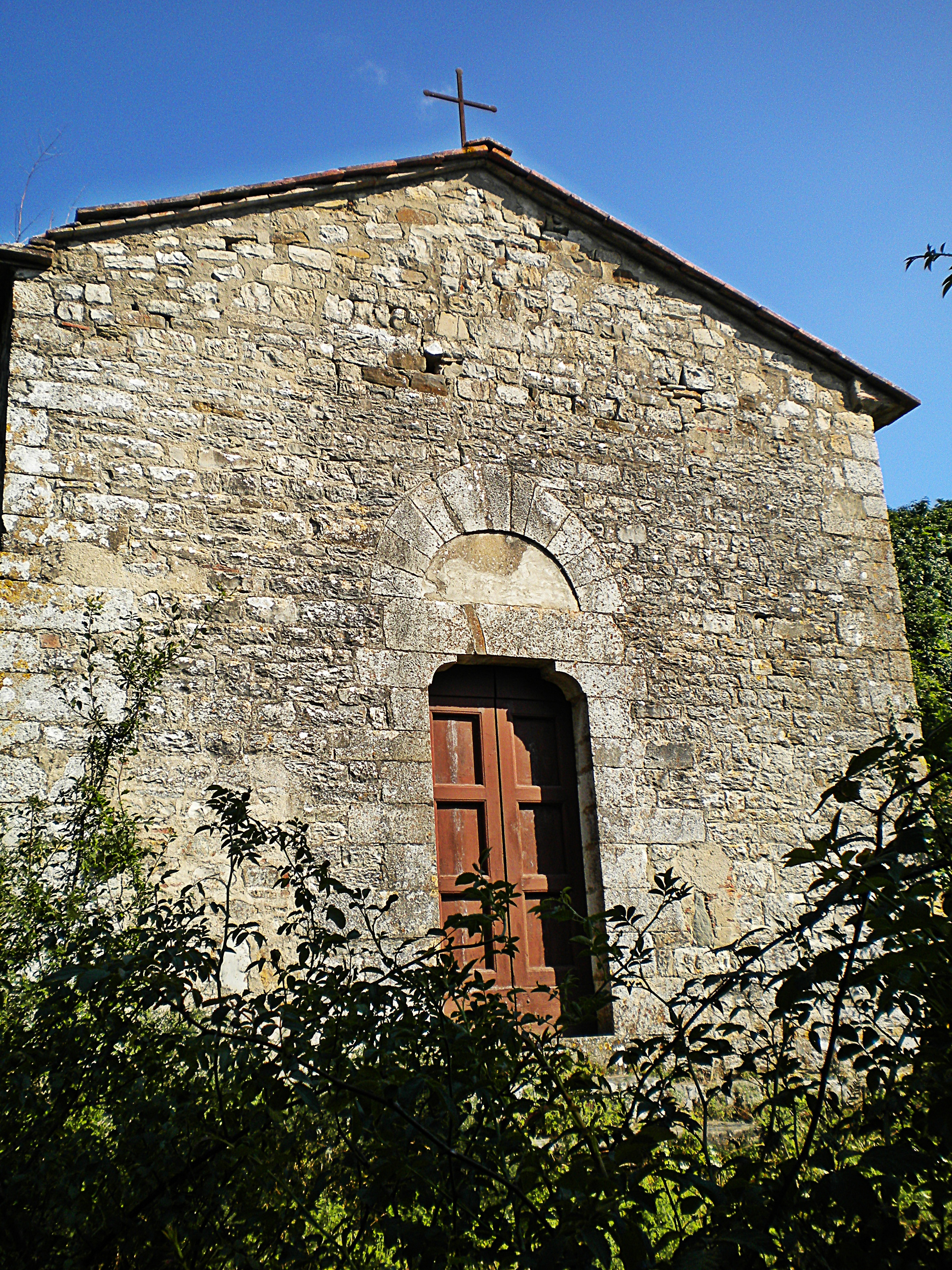
Saint Stephan church in the abandoned village of Parmigno

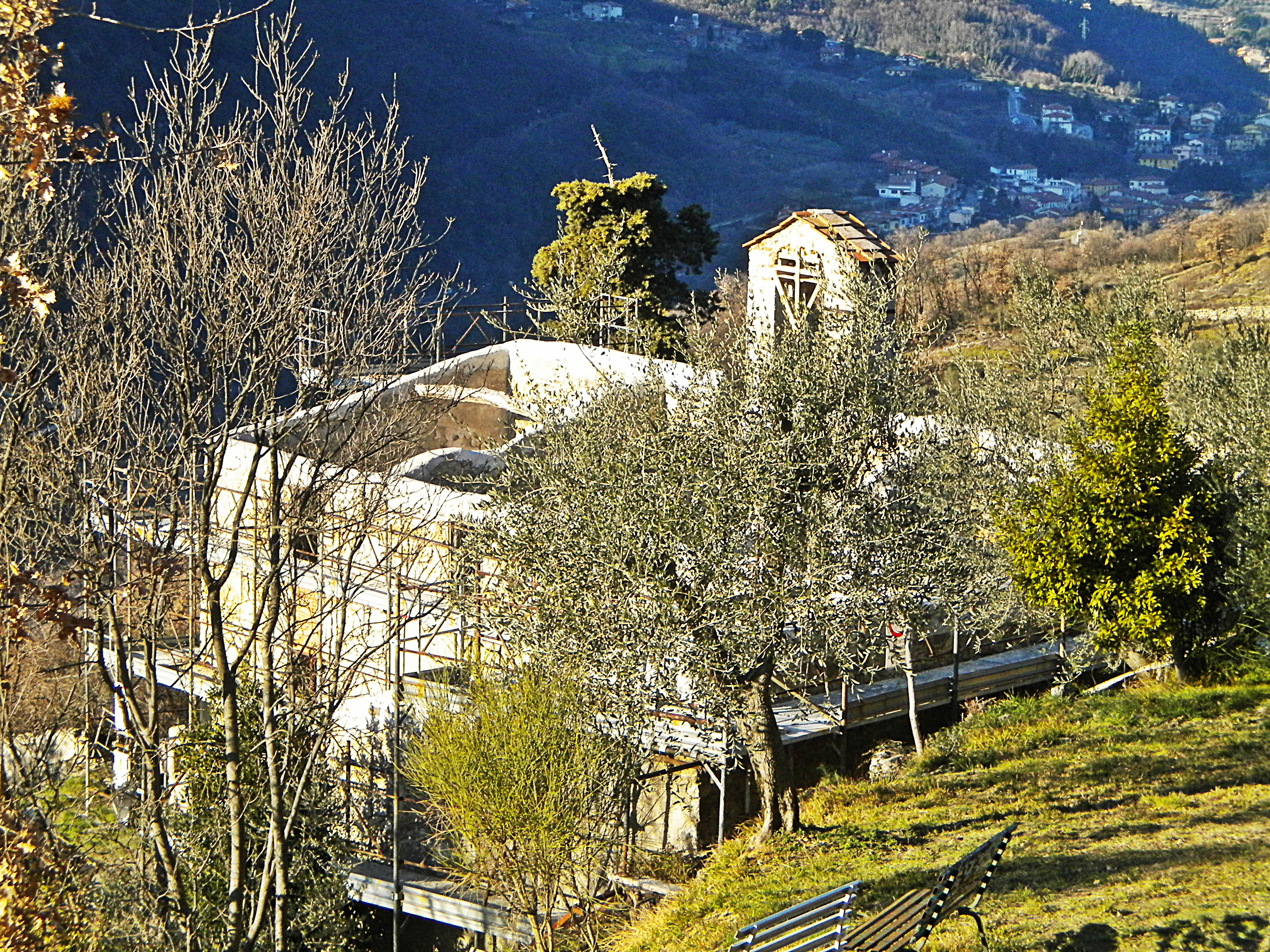
Saint Leonard church in the abandoned (now in restructuring) village of San Leonardo in Collina

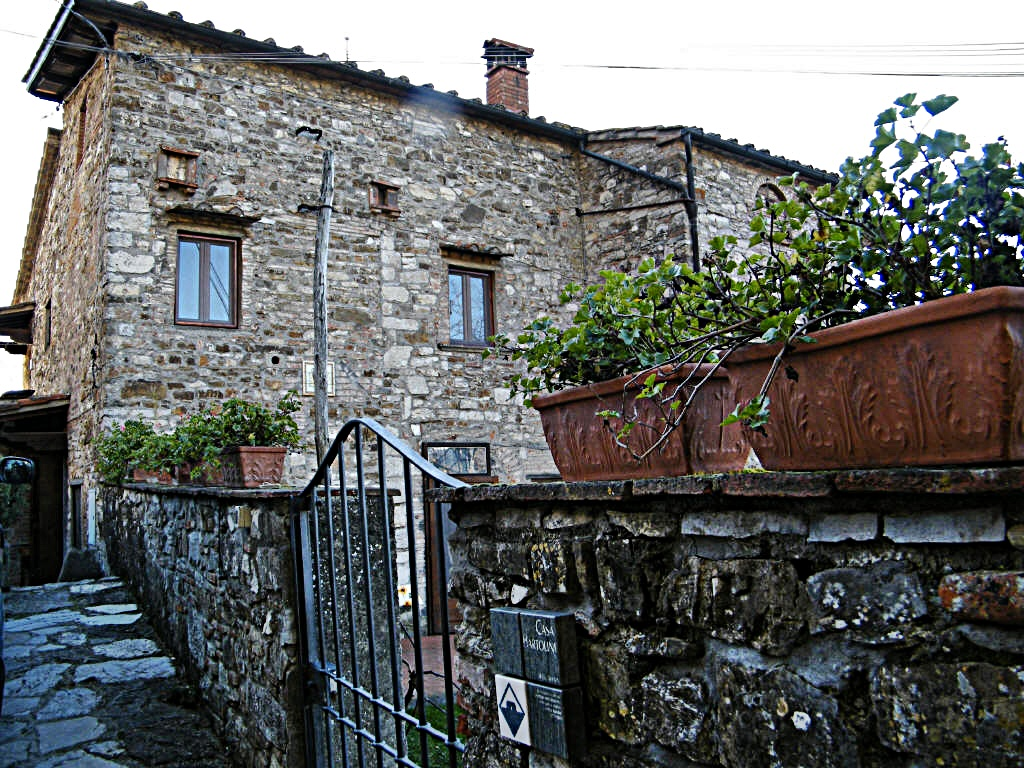
Birthplace of the sculptor Lorenzo Bartolini in Savignano

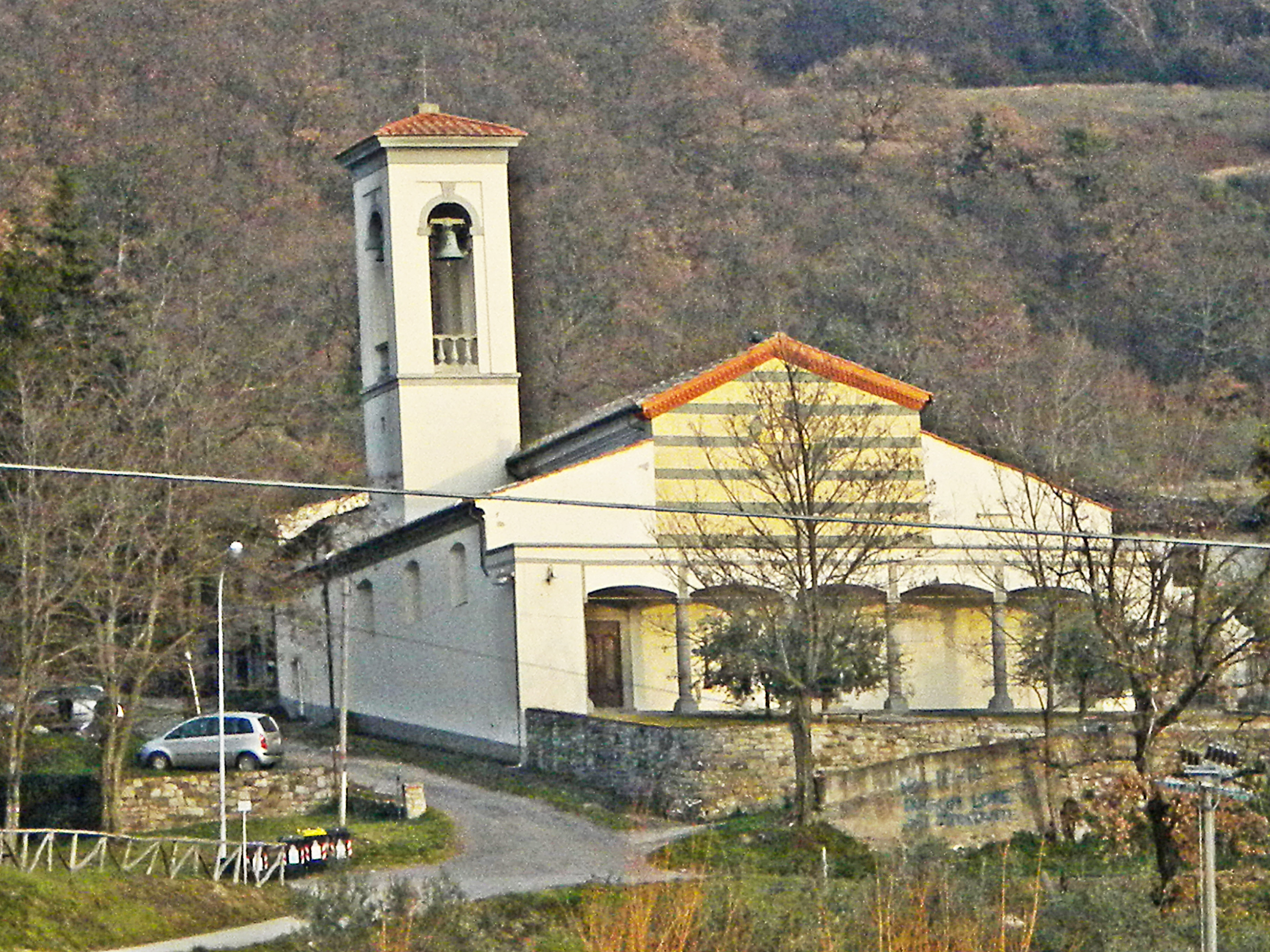
Parish church Santi Vito e Modesto in Sofignano

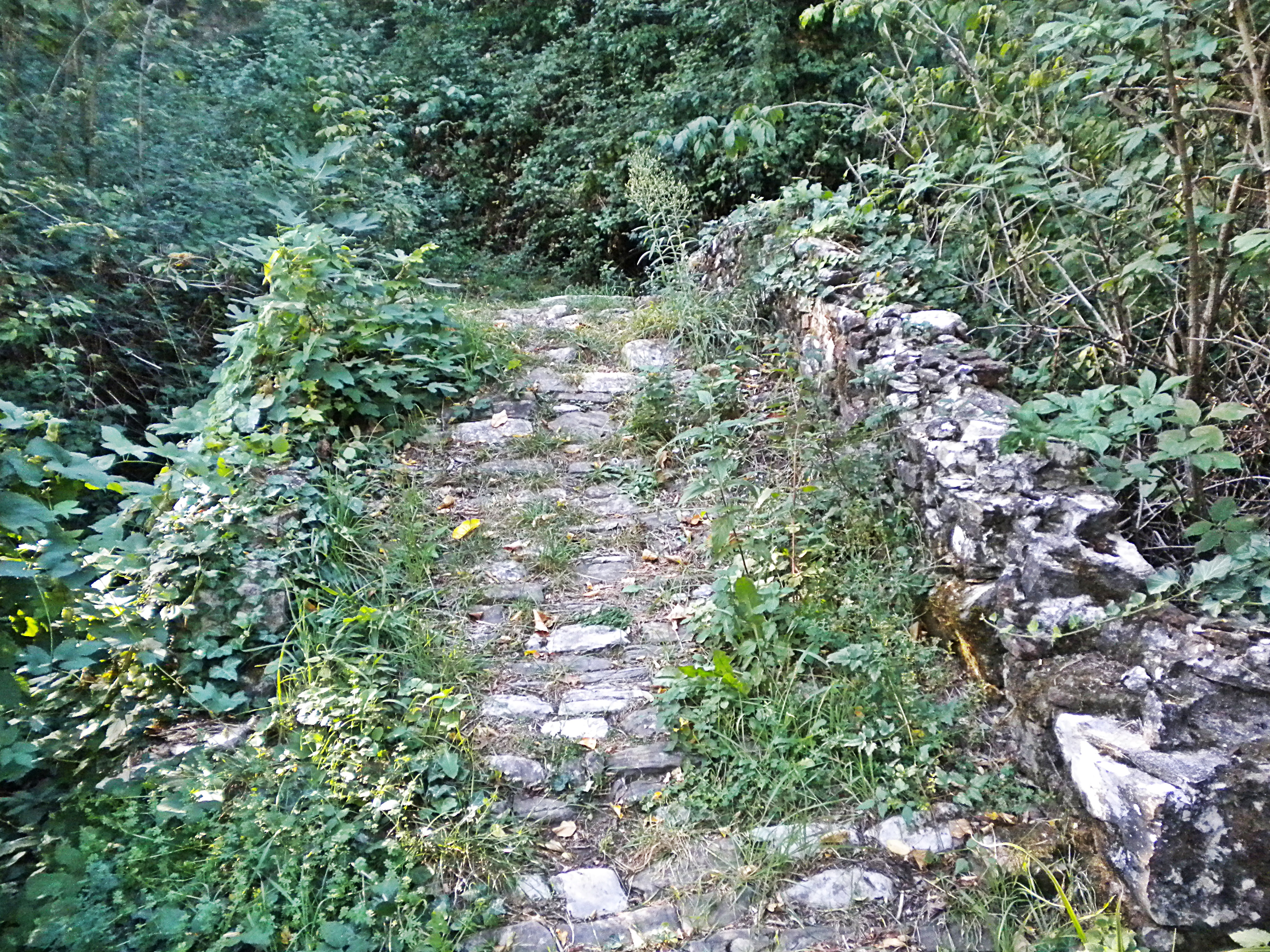
Roman bridge by Savignano
