= Santi Vito e Modesto in Sofignano =

Church in Sofignano, Italy

Coordinates: 43.9706828°N 11.1480033°E

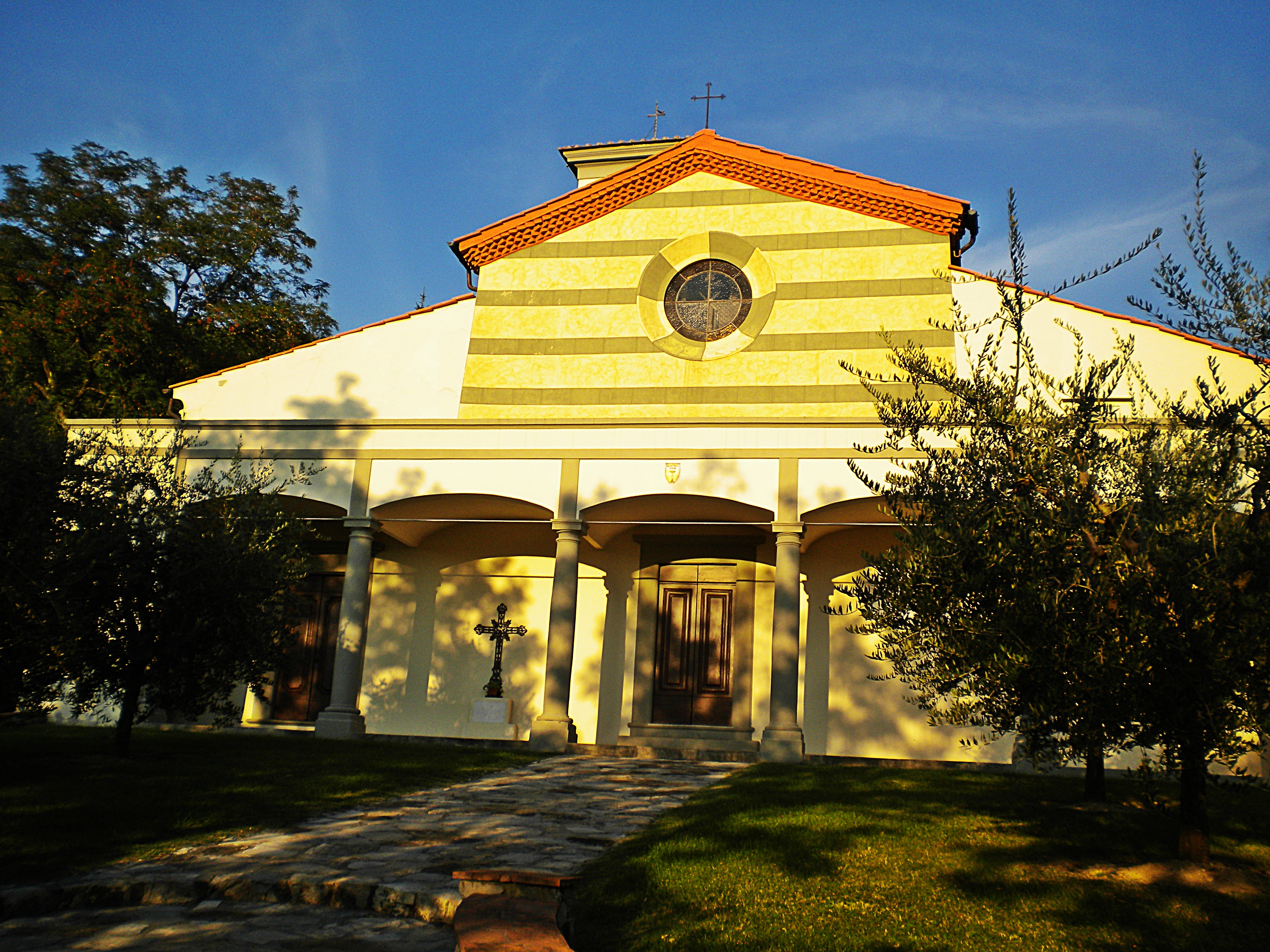
Facade

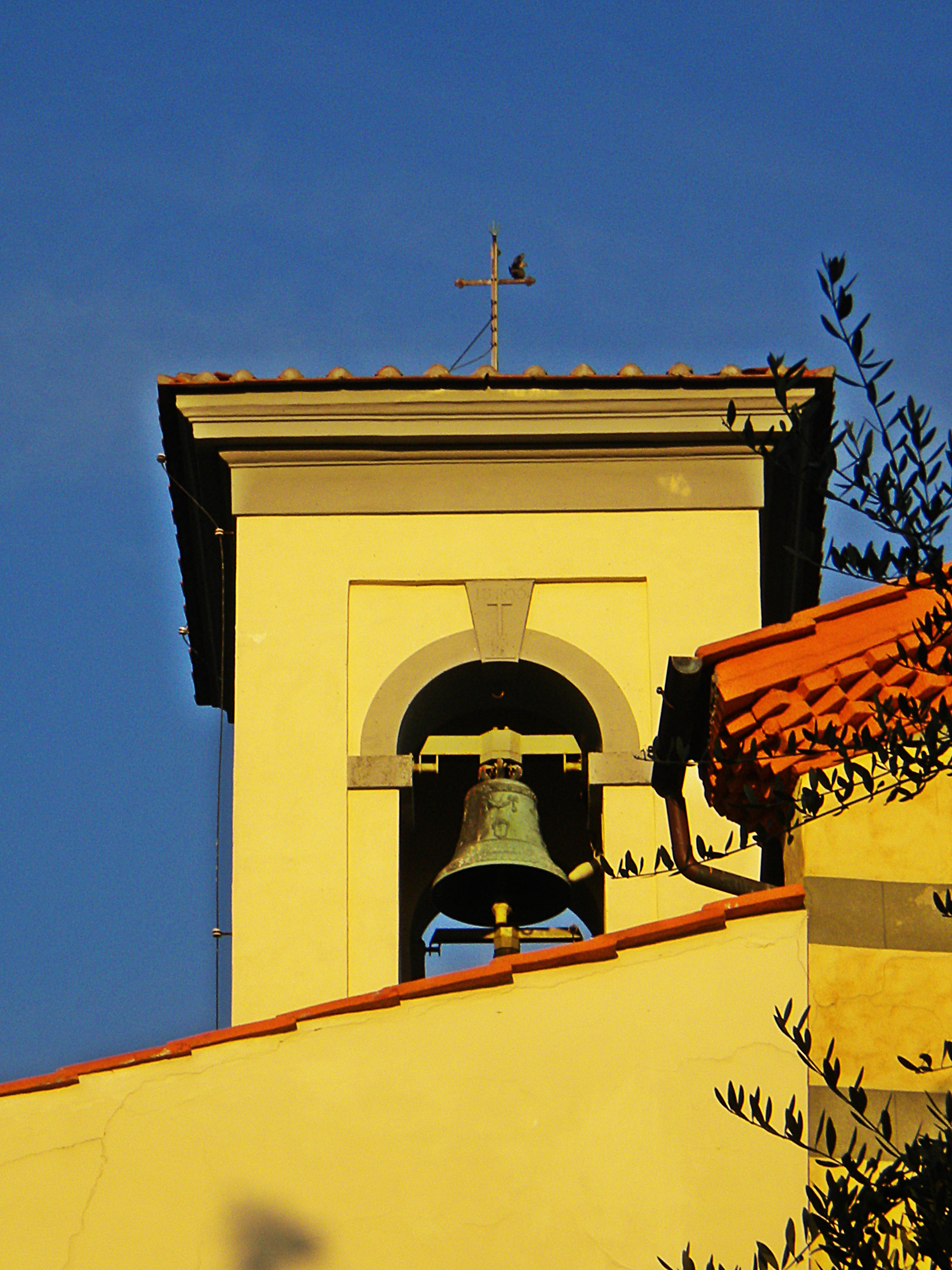
Bell tower

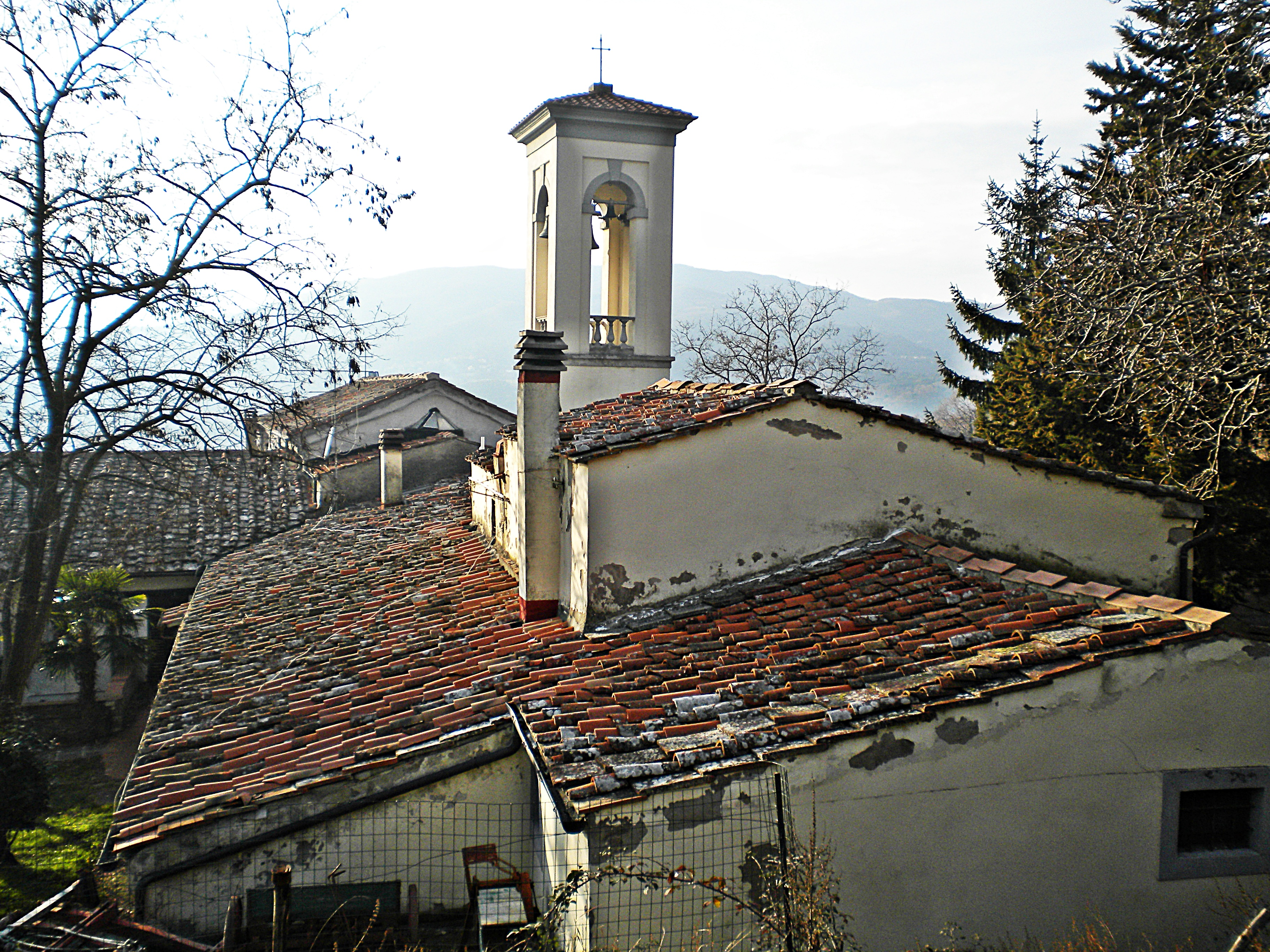
Back side

Santi Vito e Modesto is a church in the Italian village of Sofignano, a frazione of Vaiano, in the region of Tuscany, Italy

== History ==
The parish church has been in use since 1024. Originally, the church had a very simple structure: a single nave in court, trussed roof, and façade. The sizes were very small, as suggested in the top portion of the facade. The shape of the church is not very different from the Romanesque-style churches of San Pietro a Filgine, Saints Ippolito and Cassiano Vernio and Santa Maria Assunta in Filettole.

=== Current status ===
The complex consists of three different rooms in the center, the church nave, and includes further rooms to left and right of the sacristy. All three rooms are connected by a porch outside. The central structure of the present church has remained substantially the same as the original, and is still easily recognizable from the outside shape of the original church.

The facade is dominated by the large porch, which has 5 arches reminiscent of ancient basilicas. The porch is the focal point of the whole structure, and is the connecting element of the strange combination of premises adjacent to the church. Although externally there is a feeling of unity and correspondence between the arches of the porch and the inner aisles, emphasized with a sharp two-tone coloring of white and green (as was the case with basilicas), internally there is none. This allows for the avoidance of a feeling of narrowness that would be present from going into a space less than what was expected.

Inside, the church appears as it did in 1862, with plastered walls and two side altars.
