= Giorgio Vestri =

Italian politician (1929–2002)

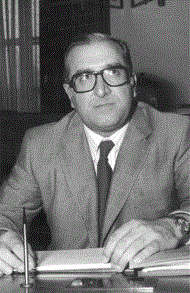

Member of the Chamber of Deputies
- In office 1958–1966

Mayor of Prato
- In office 1965–1975
- Preceded by: Roberto Giovannini
- Succeeded by: Goffredo Lohengrin Landini

Member of the Regional Council of Tuscany
- In office 1975–1985

Regional assessor for Healthcare and Social welfare of Tuscany
- In office 1975–1985

Personal details
- Born: 17 February 1929 Prato, Province of Florence, Kingdom of Italy
- Died: 6 April 2002 (aged 73)
- Party: Italian Communist Party

Giorgio Vestri (17 February 1929 – 6 April 2002) was an Italian politician who served as a member of the Chamber of Deputies from 1958 to 1966, as mayor of Prato from 1965 to 1975, and as a member of the Regional Council of Tuscany from 1975 to 1985. He also served as regional assessor for Healthcare and Social welfare in the regional government of Tuscany.
