= Sofignano =

- Frazione
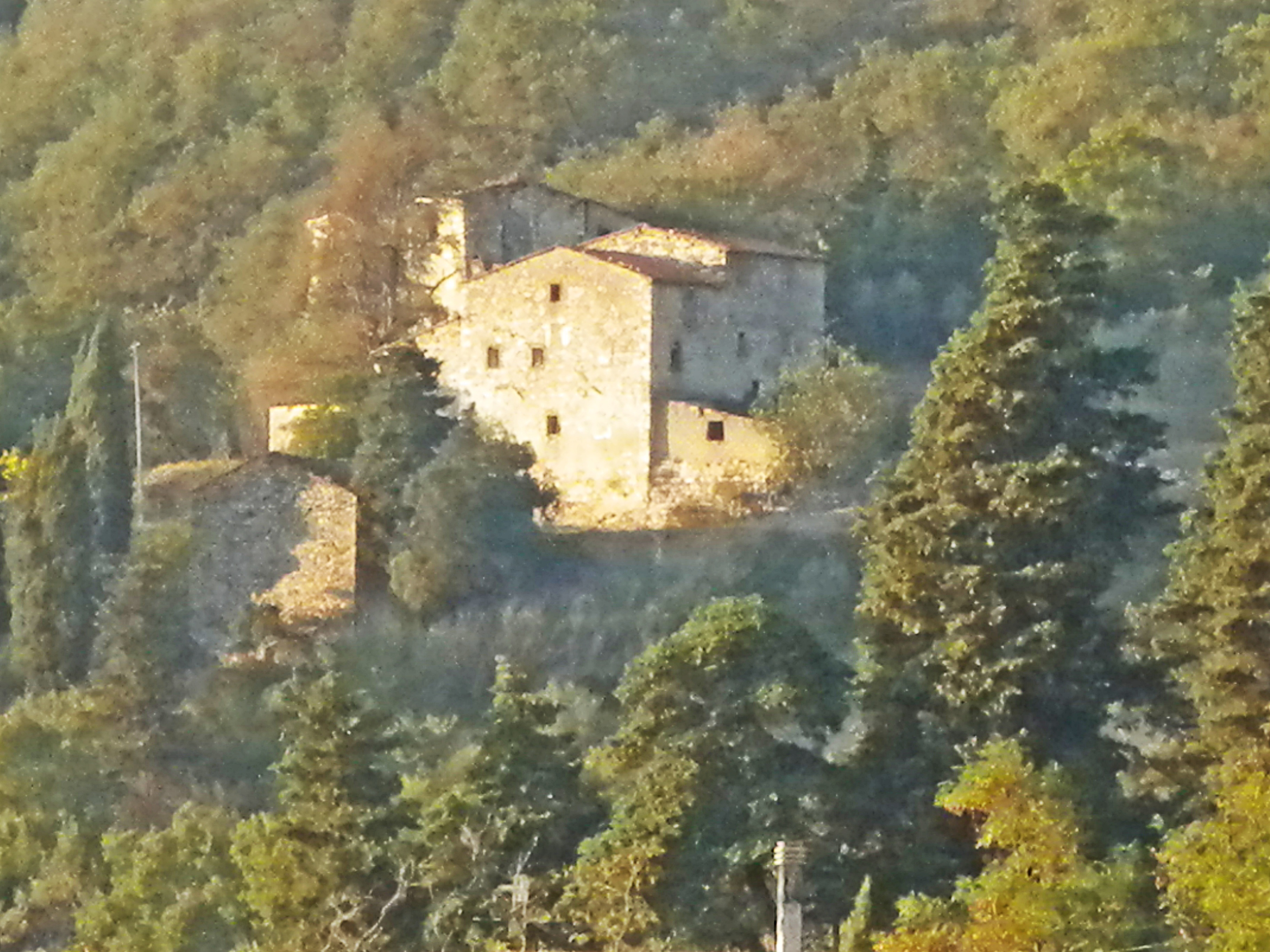
- Old Sofignano

- Location of Sofignano in Italy
- Coordinates: 43°57′22.82″N 11°8′7.8″E
- Country: Italy
- Region: Tuscany
- Province: Prato (PO)
- Comune: Vaiano
- Demonym: Sofignanesi
- Time zone: UTC+1 (CET)
  - Summer (DST): UTC+2 (CEST)
- Postal code: 59021
- Dialing code: 0574

Sofignano is an Italian village and frazione belonging to the municipality of Vaiano, in the Province of Prato, Tuscany.

The village is located 2 km from Vaiano, on the mid side of the western face of the Calvana Hill.

== Hamlets ==
Sofignano also includes the hamlets of Boana, Ca' dei Landi, Casanera, Collisassi, Colombaia, Docciola, Fattoria delle Mura, L'Olmo, La Lastruccia, Il Baldino, and Le Fornaci.

== Monuments ==
- Santi Vito e Modesto in Sofignano

== Gallery ==
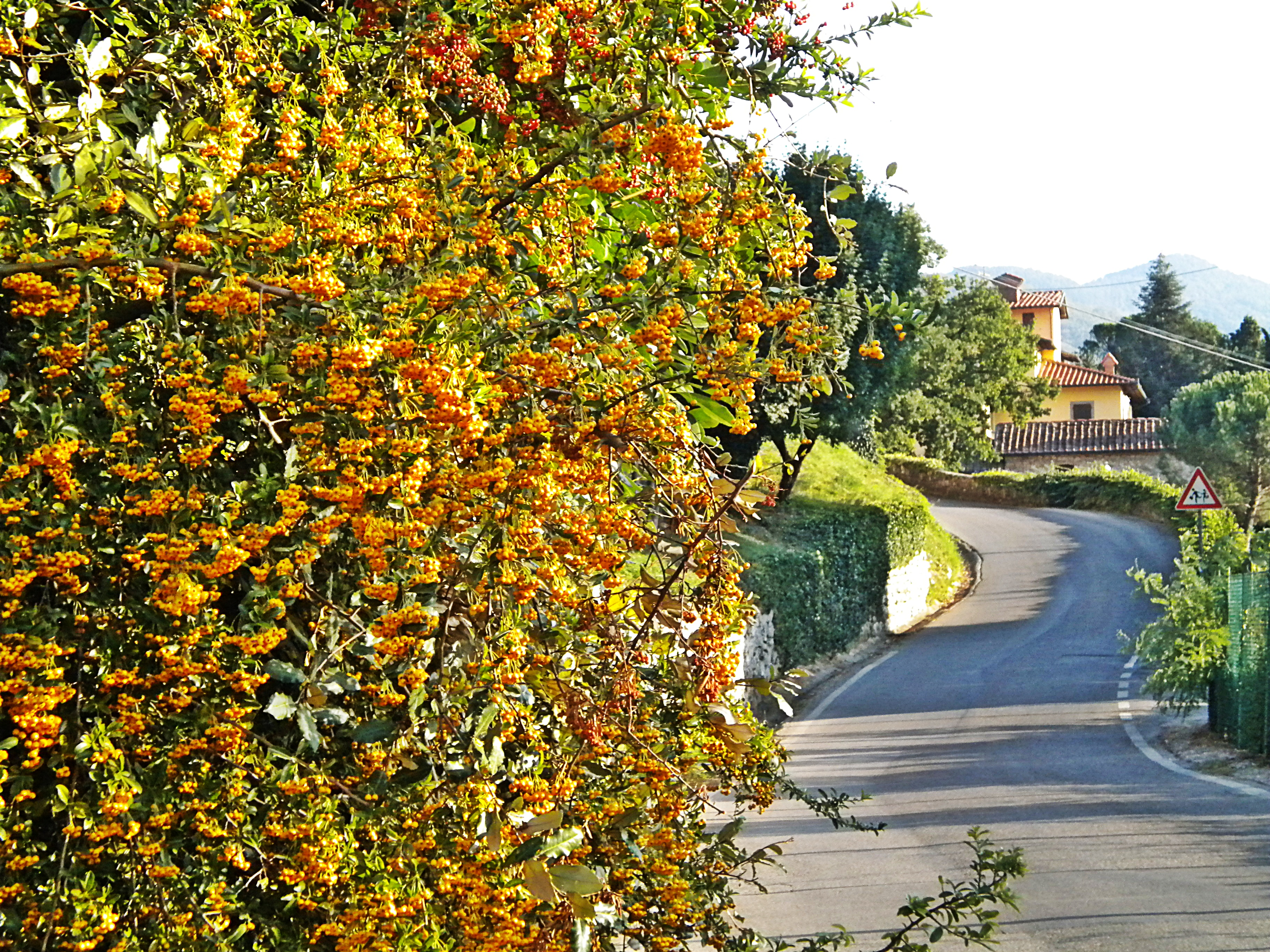
Landscape of Boana

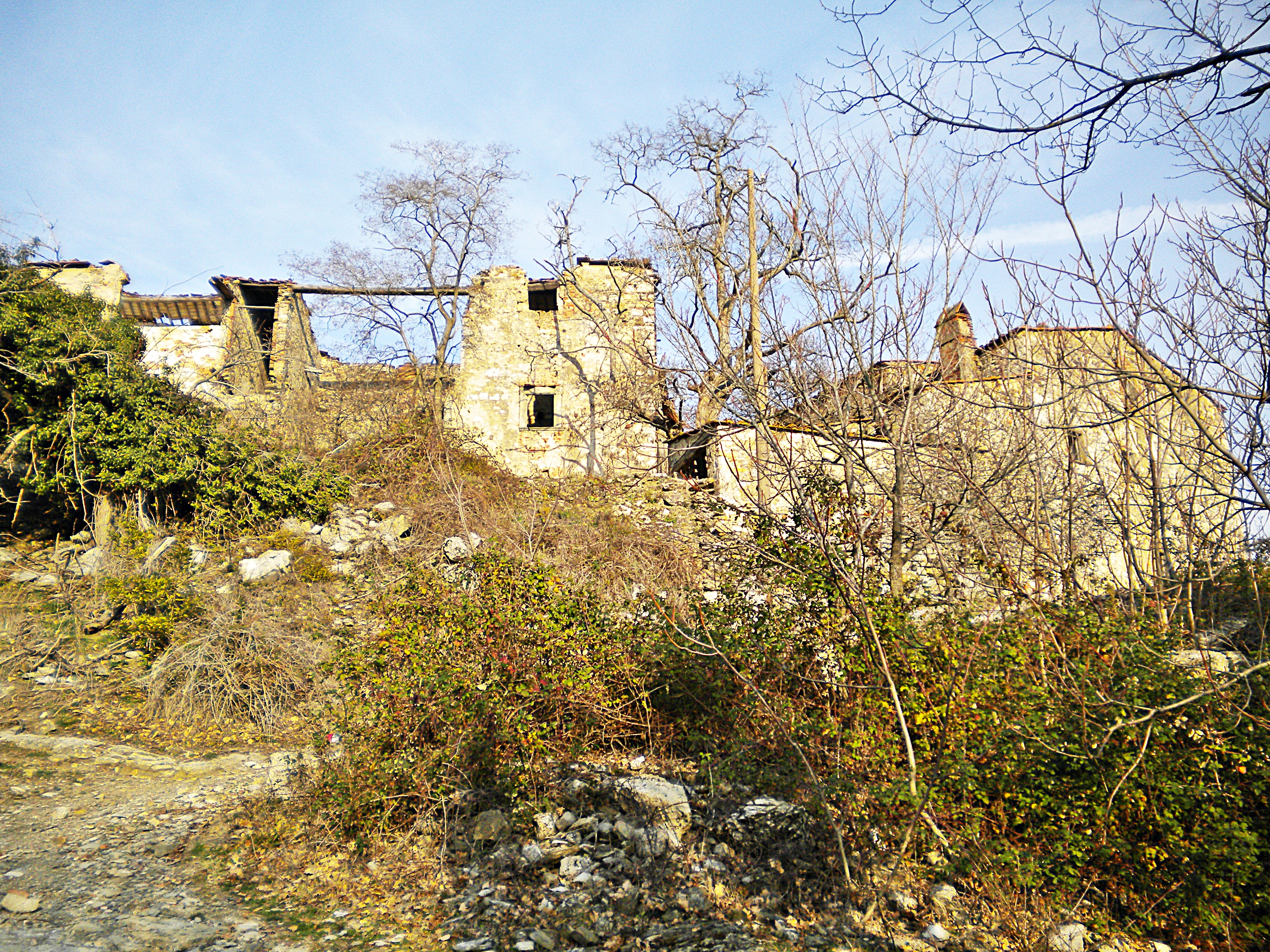
Ca' dei Landi

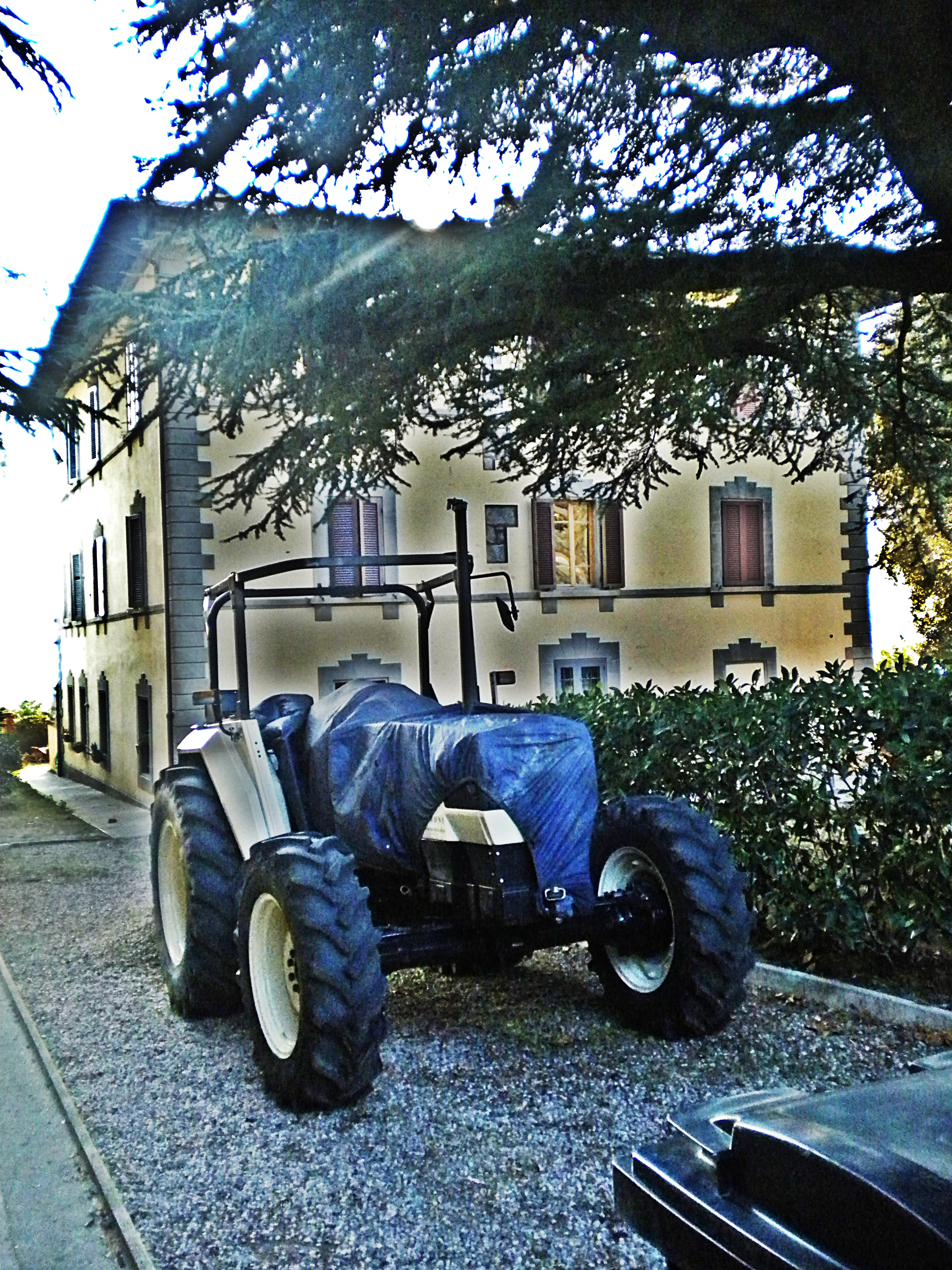
Villa Fabbri

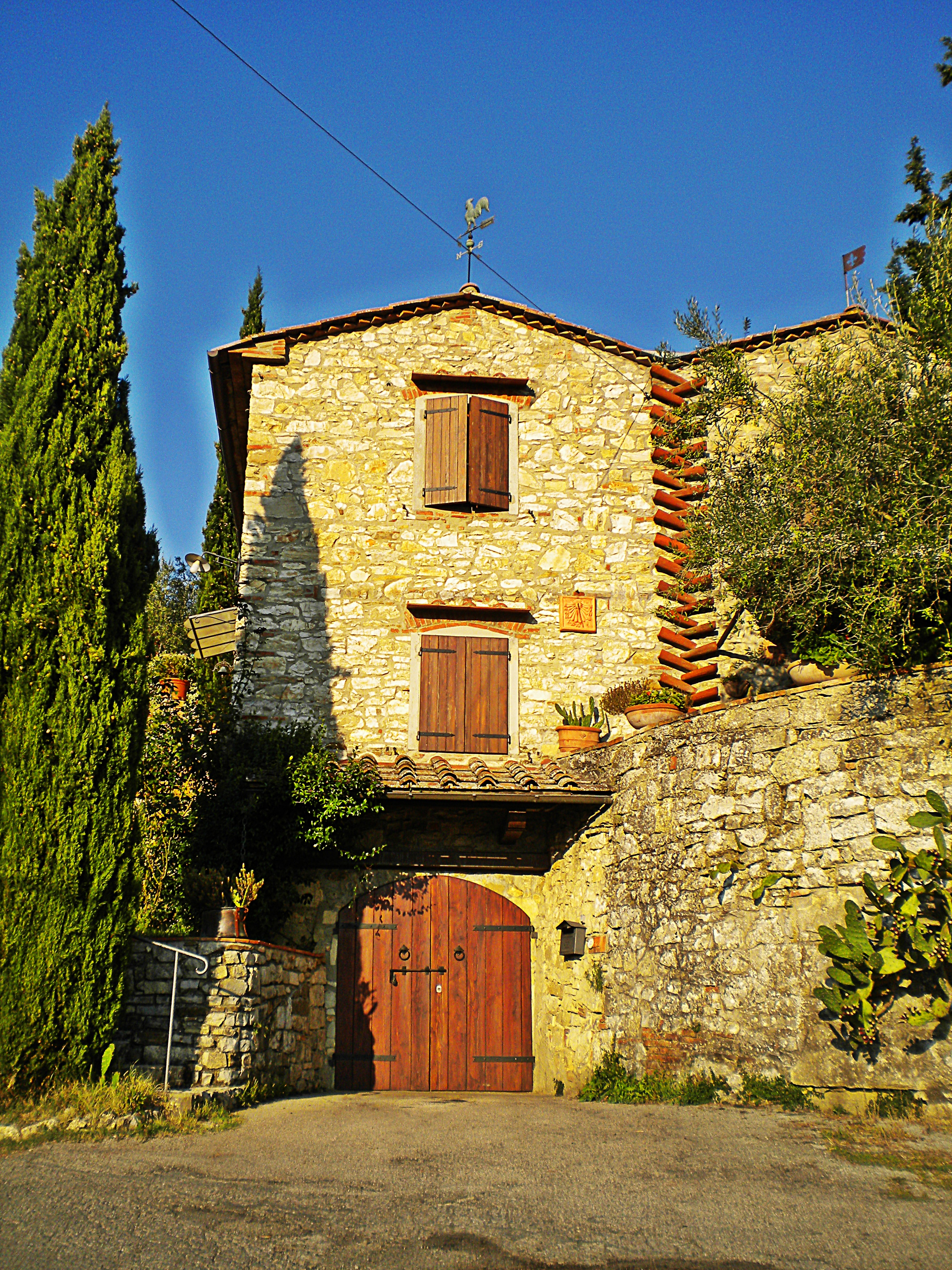
Old Mill

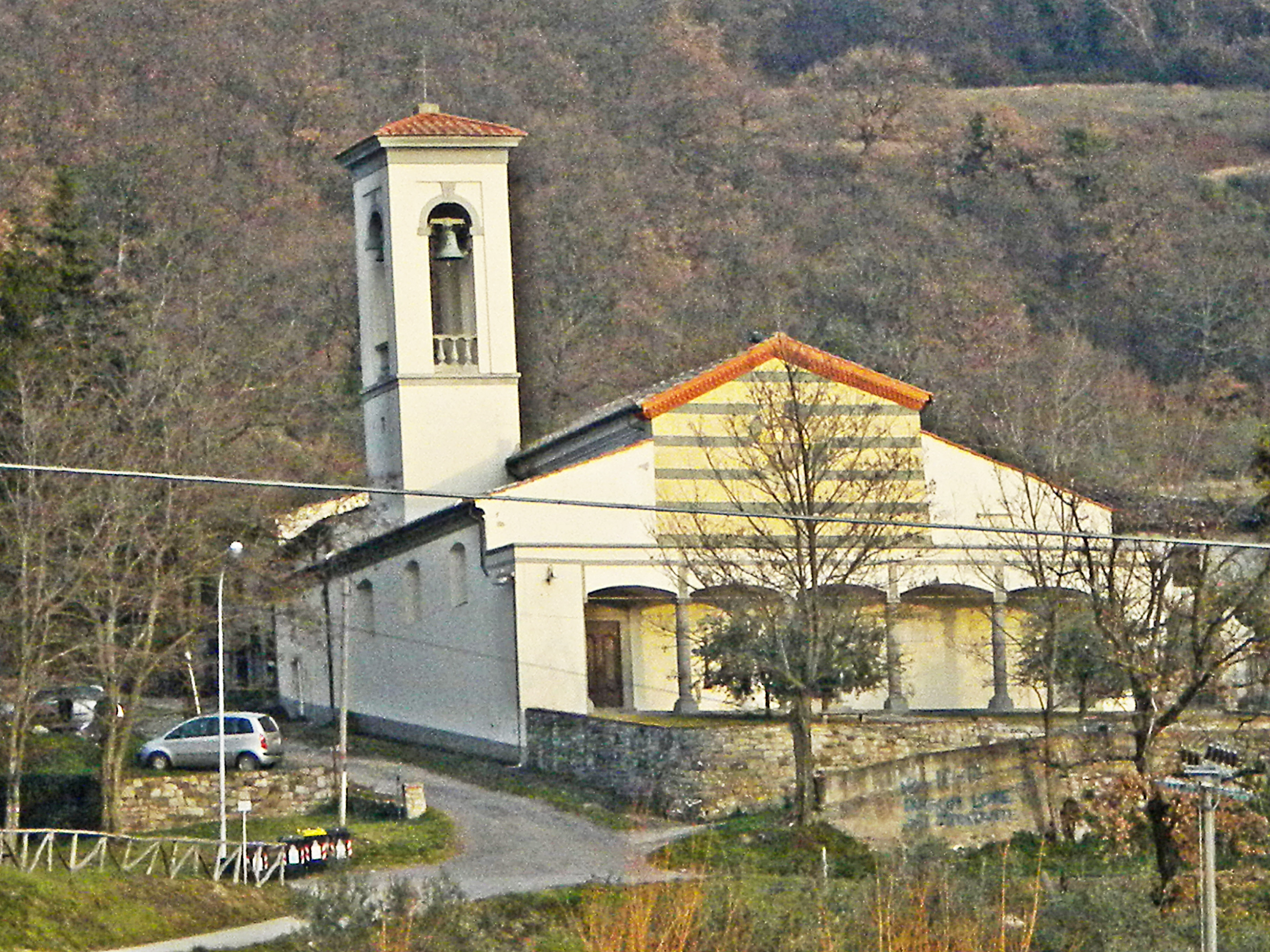
Parish church Santi Vito e Modesto in Sofignano

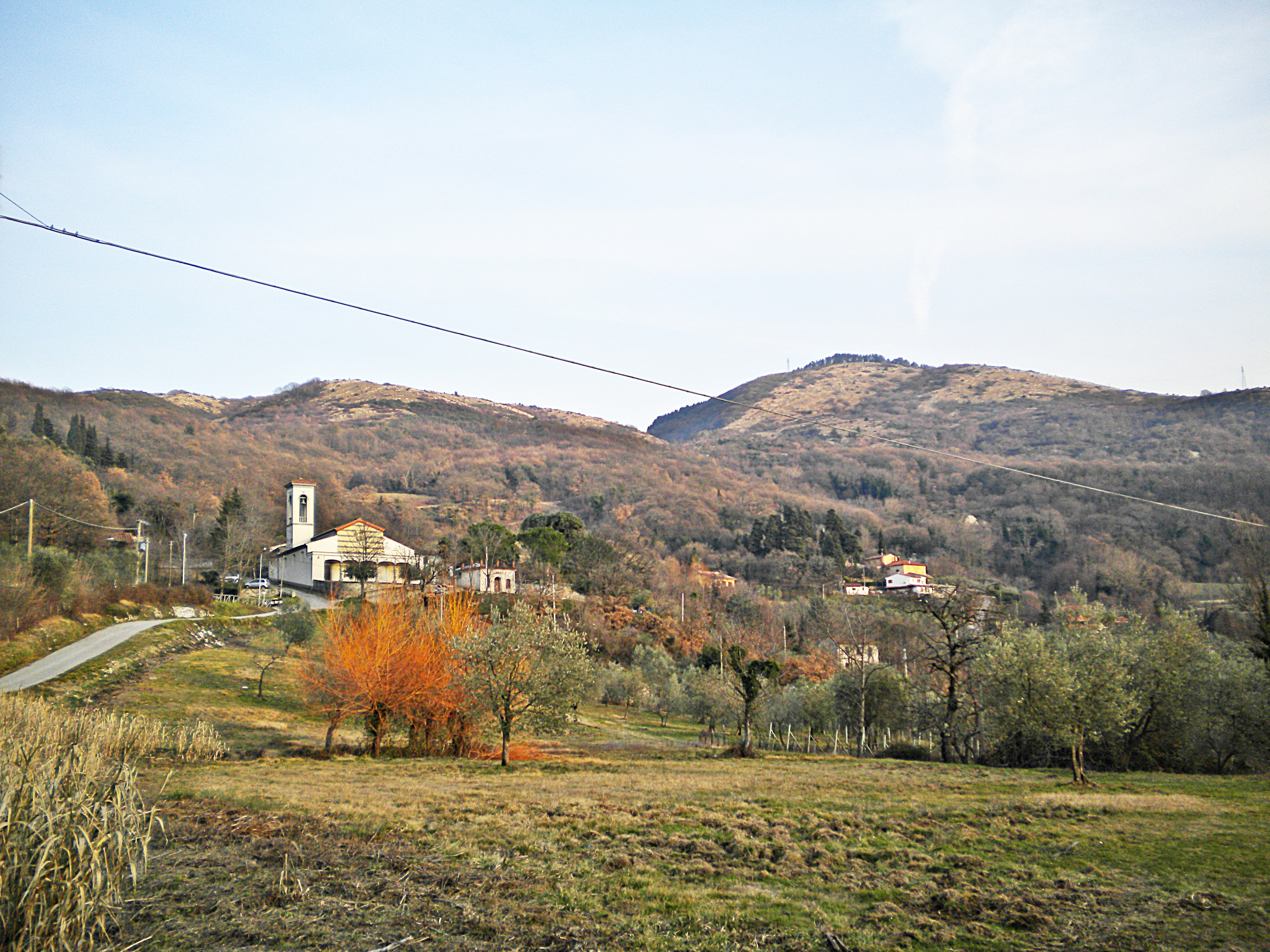
Landscape of L'Olmo

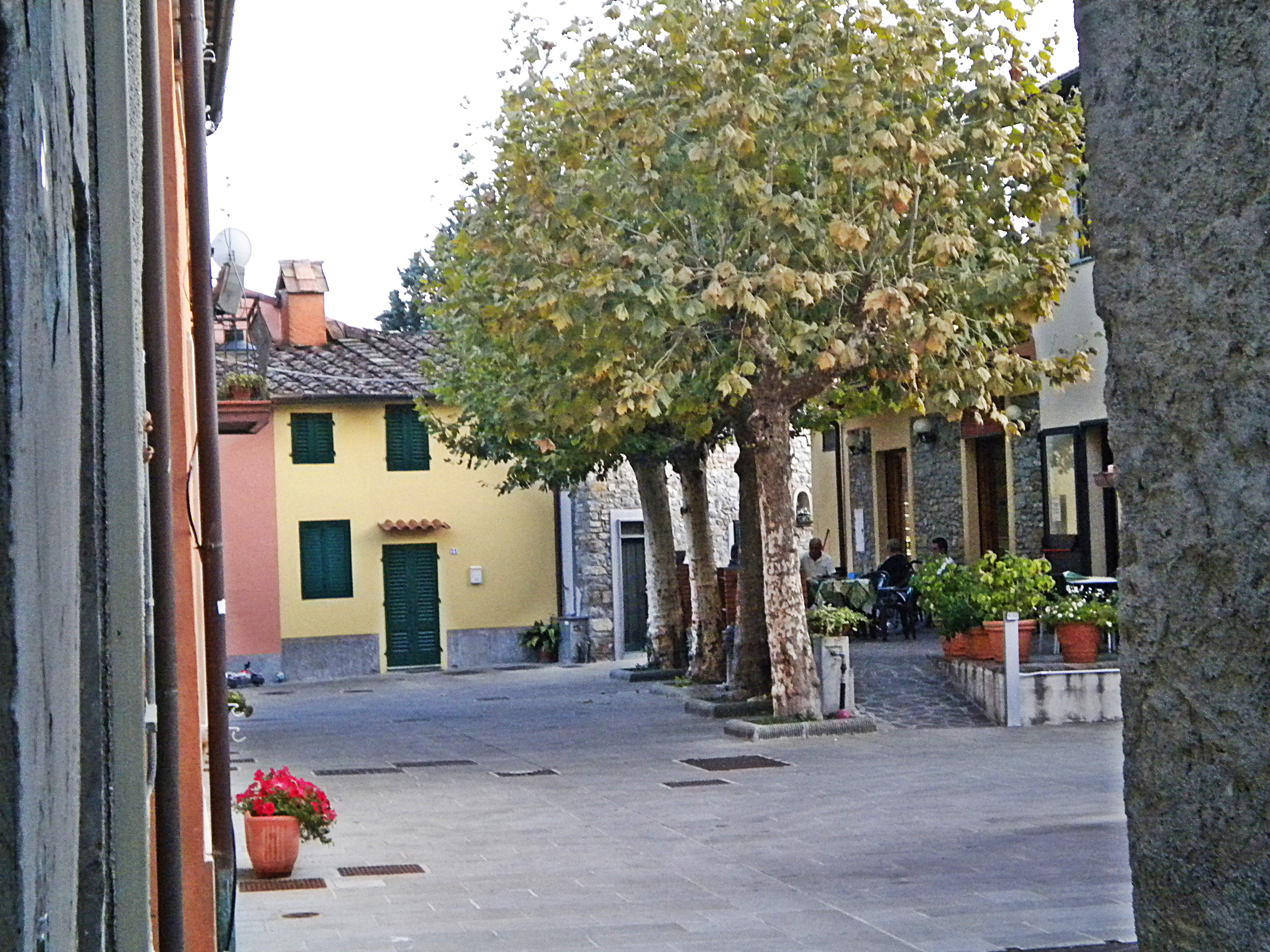
Old village Le Fornaci

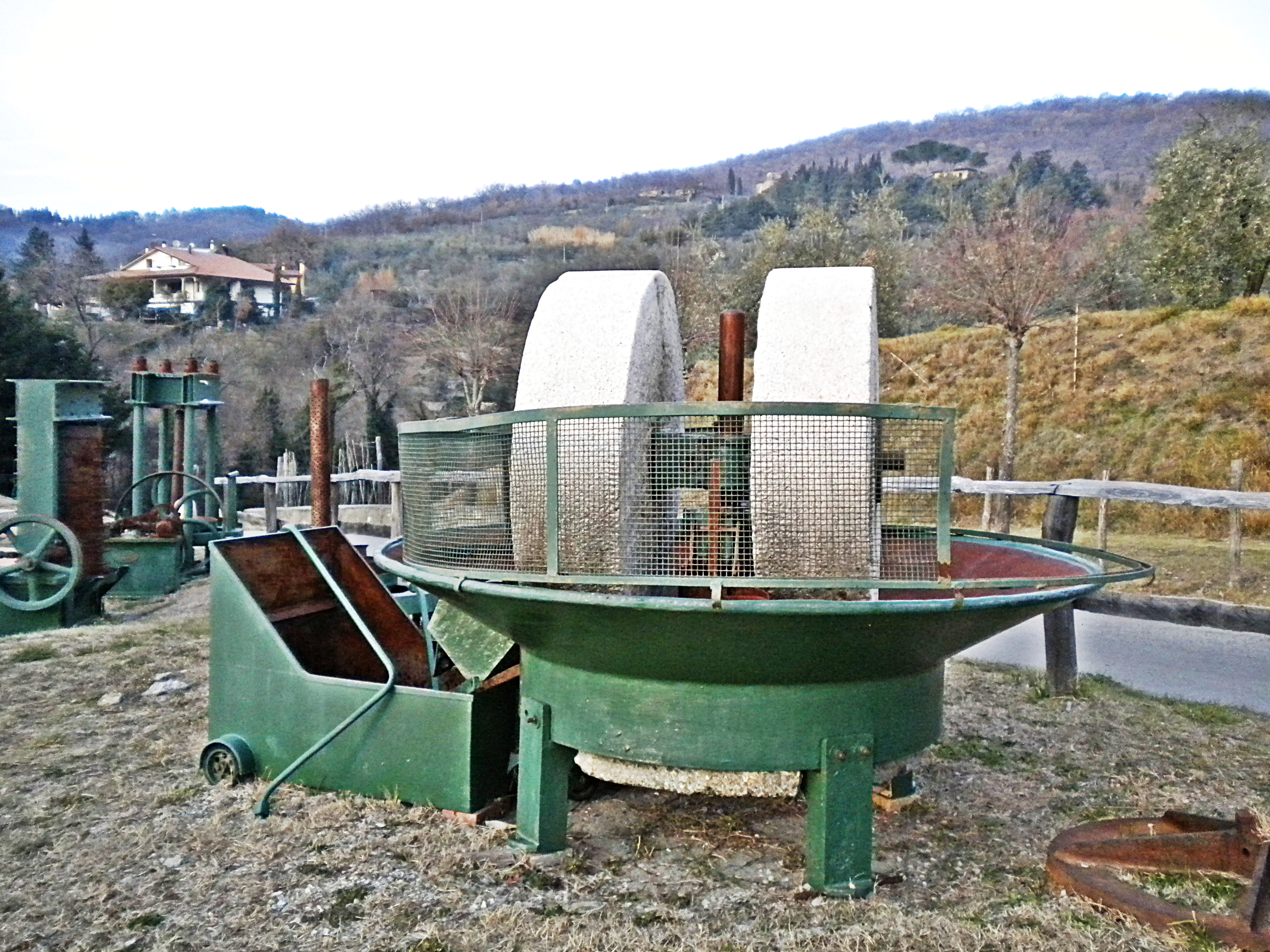
Bisenzio Valley oil mill in Le Fornaci
