= List of presidents of the Province of Prato =

President of the Province of Prato
- Presidente della Provincia di Prato
- Incumbent; Simone Calamai since 26 November 2022
- Residence: Palazzo Banci Buonamici
- Term length: 4 years
- Inaugural holder: Daniele Mannocci
- Formation: 1995
- Deputy: Federica Palanghi

The president of the Province of Prato is the head of the provincial government in Prato, Tuscany, Italy. The president oversees the administration of the province, coordinates the activities of the municipalities, and represents the province in regional and national matters. The provincial government is headquartered in the Palazzo Banci Buonamici in Prato, where the council chamber is located.

Since November 2022, the office has been held by Simone Calamai of the Democratic Party.

== History ==
The Province of Prato was established in 1992, after being separated from the Province of Florence. In its initial phase, the new province was administered by a government-appointed extraordinary commissioner, pending the organisation of its institutional bodies. Following the 1995 elections, Daniele Mannocci took office as the first president of the province, marking the beginning of the province's ordinary democratic administration. In accordance with the reform of local authorities introduced in 1993, the president was directly elected by the citizens for a five-year term and was responsible for appointing and dismissing the members of the Provincial Executive.

Following the 2014 Delrio Law, the president is elected by an assembly composed of the mayors and municipal councillors of the municipalities within the province. The president serves a four-year term and acts as the legal representative of the province, presiding over the Provincial Council and the Provincial Assembly of Mayors.

== List ==
No.	Portrait	Name	Term of office		Party	Election
No.	Portrait	Name	Start	End	Party	Election
1		Daniele Mannocci (b. 1957)	8 May 1995	16 June 1999	Independent (centre-left)	1995
1		Daniele Mannocci (b. 1957)	16 June 1999	14 June 2004	Independent (centre-left)	1999
2		Massimo Logli (b. 1956)	14 June 2004	23 June 2009	The Daisy; Democratic Party	2004
3		Lamberto Nazzareno Gestri (b. 1942)	23 June 2009	13 October 2014	Democratic Party	2009
4		Matteo Biffoni (b. 1974)	13 October 2014	31 October 2018	Democratic Party	2014
5		Francesco Puggelli (b. 1982)	31 October 2018	26 November 2022	Democratic Party	2018
6		Simone Calamai (b. 1979)	26 November 2022	Incumbent	Democratic Party	2022
