= Teresa Meroni =

Italian worker, trade unionist and socialist (1885 –1951)

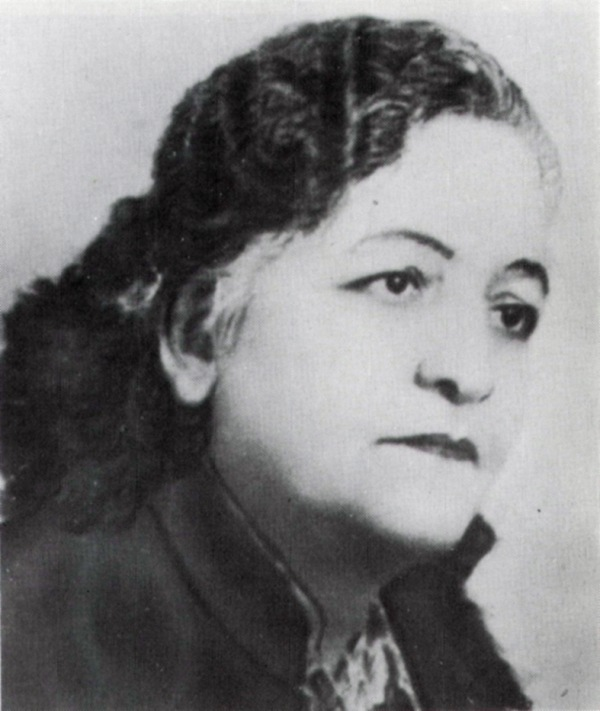
Portrait of Teresa Meroni in the late 1920s

Teresa Meroni (5 June 1885 – 17 October 1951), also called as Teresina, was an Italian worker, trade unionist, and socialist. She led one of Italy's labour movements and defended workers' rights.

== Biography ==
Born as Teresa Milano Meroni on 5 June 1885 in Milan, Italy, Teresa Meroni came from a family of modest means, which prevented her from having access to a good education. In 1905, she joined the Socialist Party, which was founded in Genoa in 1892, to protect workers' rights. She was active in mobilizing women workers to join the Socialist Party.

She married Giovan Battista Tettamanti, a noted trade union leader and communist activist. They later moved to Val di Bisenzio, exactly at Vaiano. Tettamanti, who was leading the Vaianese Wool League, left it following Italy's entry into the war. Meroni later took the leadership of the Vaianese Wool League. She is known for leading a march of 1500 women employed in the factories of Val di Bisenzio.

In 1932, she was arrested “for communist activity… and deported to an island confinement colony”.

She died on 17 October 1951 in Como.
