= Province of Prato =

Province of Italy

Coordinates: 43°52′50.93″N 11°5′47.62″E

Province of Prato Provincia di Prato (Italian)
- Province
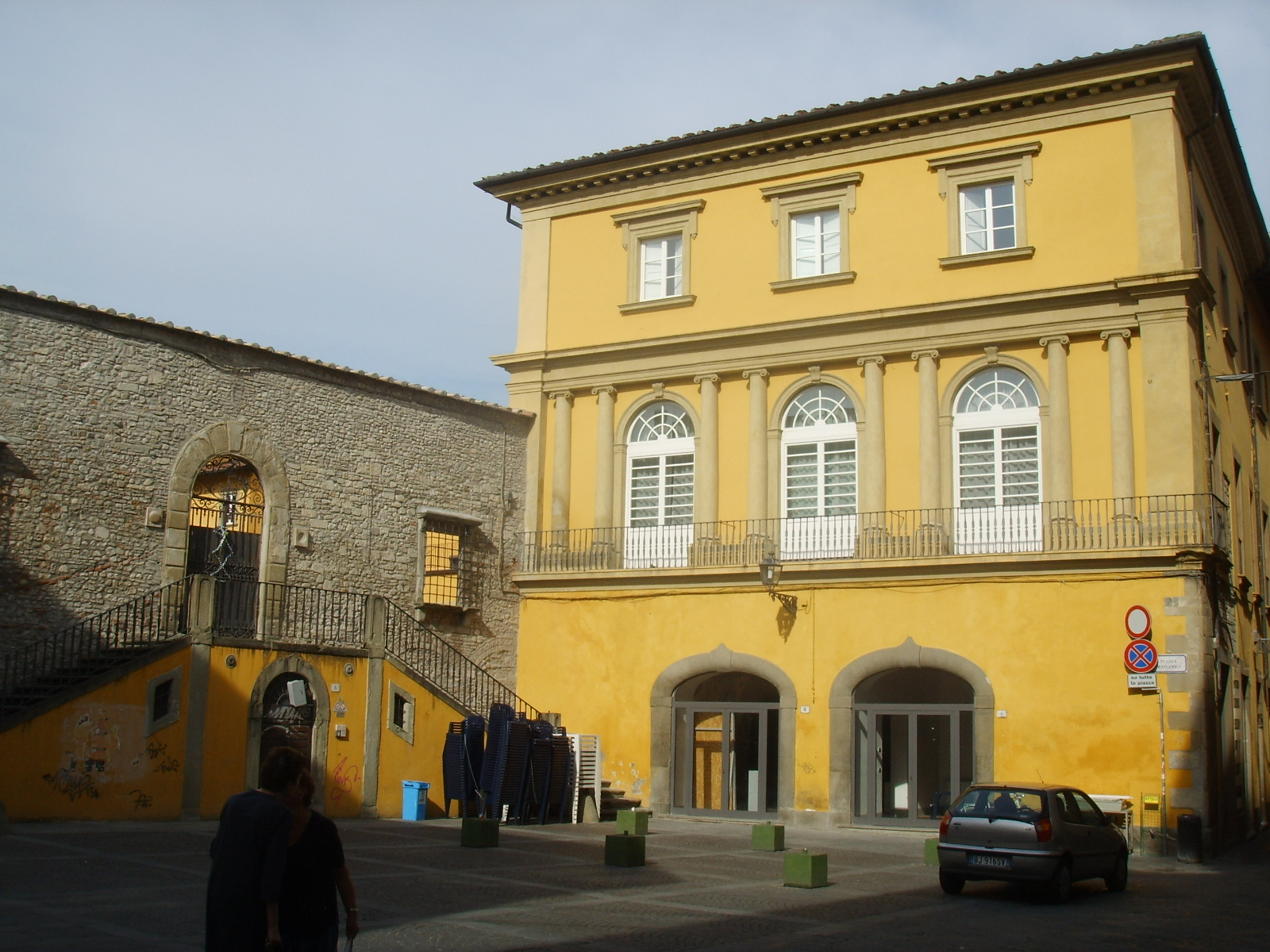
- Palazzo Banci, the provincial seat at Prato

- Flag Coat of arms

- Location of the province of Prato in Italy
- Country: Italy
- Region: Tuscany
- Capital(s): Prato
- Municipalities: 7

Government
  - President: Simone Calamai (PD)

Area
  - Total: 365.72 km^{2} (141.21 sq mi)

Population (2026)
  - Total: 261,152
  - Density: 714.08/km^{2} (1,849.4/sq mi)

GDP
  - Total: €7.395 billion (2015)
  - Per capita: €29,222 (2015)
- Time zone: UTC+1 (CET)
  - Summer (DST): UTC+2 (CEST)
- Postal code: 59100
- Telephone prefix: 0574
- Vehicle registration: PO
- ISTAT code: 100
- Website: trasparenza.provincia.prato.it

The province of Prato (Italian: provincia di Prato) is a province in the region of Tuscany in Italy. Its capital and largest city is Prato. It was carved out as a separate province from the province of Florence in 1992. It has a population of 261,152 across its 7 municipalities.

Spread over an area of 365.72 km^{2} (141.21 sq mi), it is the smallest province by land area in Tuscany. It is bordered by the province of Pistoia, and the metropolitan cities of Bologna and Florence.

== History ==
The region is known for its textile industries, which date back to the 12th century CE. The region experienced an economic decline after the late Middle Ages, before the textile industry reinvigorated in the late 18th century. The province was carved out as a separate province from the province of Florence in 1992.

== Geography ==
The province is situated in the Tuscany region of Central Italy. It is bordered by Pistoia province, and the metropolitan cities of Bologna and Florence. Spread over an area of 365.72 km^{2} (141.21 sq mi), it is the smallest province by land area in Tuscany. Its capital and largest city is Prato. The Bisenzio River, a tributary of the Arno River flows through the province. The region is located at the foothills of the Apennines. The geology of the region is largely made up of Tuscan nappe, made up stones such as alberese, and pietra serena.

== Government ==
The provincial government is headed by a president, elected every four years by the assembly composed of the mayors and municipal councillors of the municipalities of the province. It is headquartered in the Palazzo Banci Buonamici in Prato. Since November 2022, the office has been held by Simone Calamai of the Democratic Party.

=== Municipalities ===
There are 7 municipalities in the province:

- Cantagallo
- Carmignano
- Montemurlo
- Poggio a Caiano
- Prato
- Vaiano
- Vernio

== Demographics ==
As of 2026, the population is 261,152, of which 49.4% are male, and 50.6% are female. Minors make up 14.5% of the population, and seniors make up 23.4%.

Historical population

Year	Pop.	±%
1861	55,479	—
1871	62,278	+12.3%
1881	64,893	+4.2%
1901	78,770	+21.4%
1911	86,014	+9.2%
1921	90,852	+5.6%
1931	97,500	+7.3%
1936	99,131	+1.7%

Year	Pop.	±%
1951	111,769	+12.7%
1961	145,703	+30.4%
1971	181,606	+24.6%
1981	206,374	+13.6%
1991	217,244	+5.3%
2001	227,886	+4.9%
2011	245,916	+7.9%
2021	258,123	+5.0%

Source: ISTAT

=== Immigration ===
As of 2025, immigrants make up 21.7% of the total population, the highest proportion out of the Italian provinces. The 5 largest foreign countries of birth are China, Albania, Pakistan, Romania, and Morocco.

== Notable people ==
- Fiorenzo Magni, cyclist
- Jury Chechi, Olympic gymnast
- Paolo Rossi, footballer
- Roberto Benigni, actor and comedian
