= Duti =

Duti is a given name and surname. It may refer to:

- Cosimo Duti (active 1588 - died 1630), Italian painter
- Duti Krushna Panda (1923–2019), Indian politician

== See also ==
- Duti Monor Jonak, Assamese romantic drama TV series
- Dutti (disambiguation)
