= Money changer =

Person or organization that exchanges the currency of one country for that of another

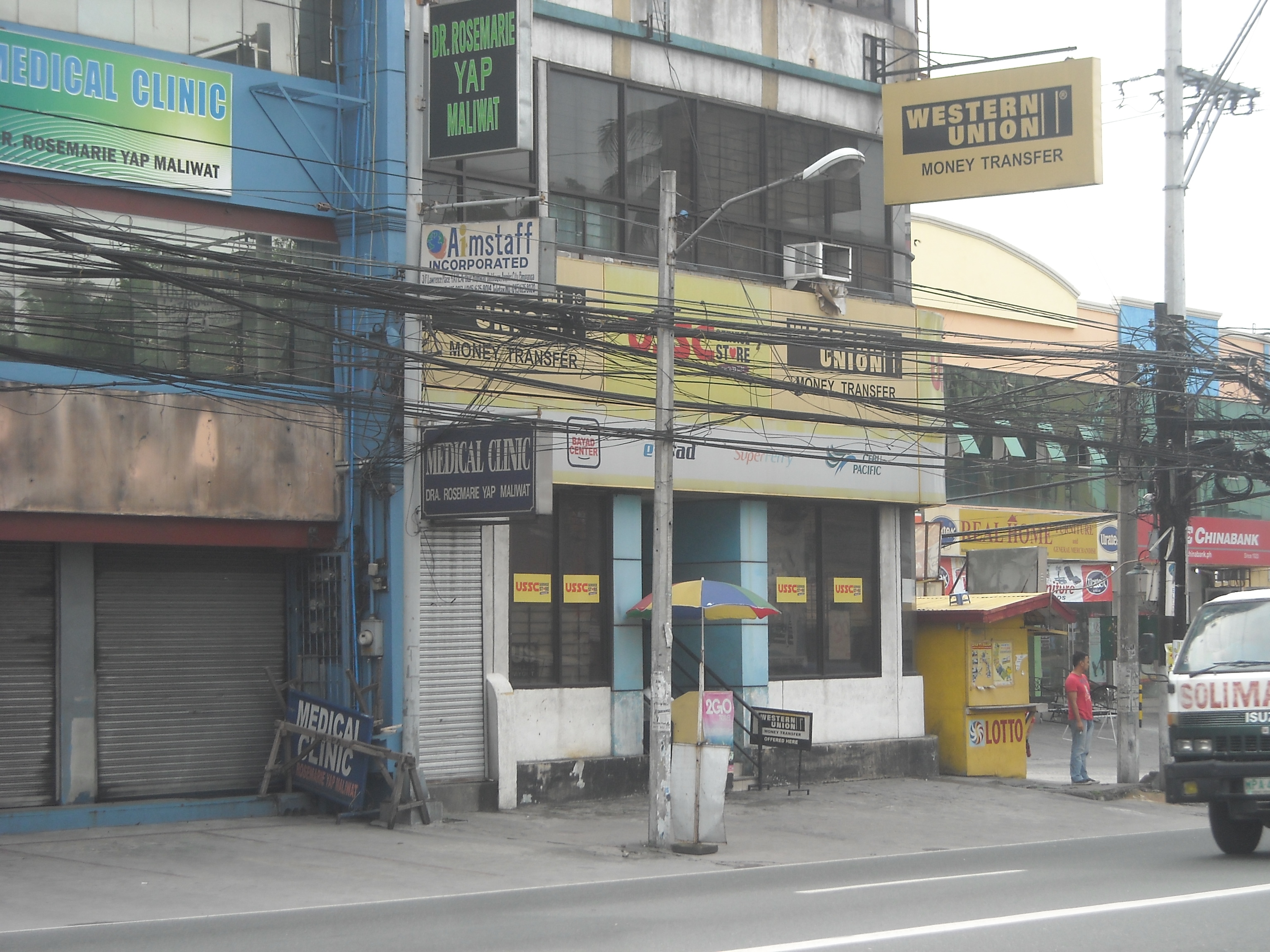
Money changers in Angeles City, Luzon

A money changer is a person or organization whose business is the exchange of coins or currency of one country for that of another. This trade was a predecessor of modern banking.

The advent of paper money in the mid-17th century and the development of modern banking and floating exchange rates in the 20th century allowed a currency exchange market to develop. This provided a way for banks and other specialist financial companies such as bureaux de change and other similar financial entities to easily change one country's money for another, and with the added confidence of transparency.

== History ==
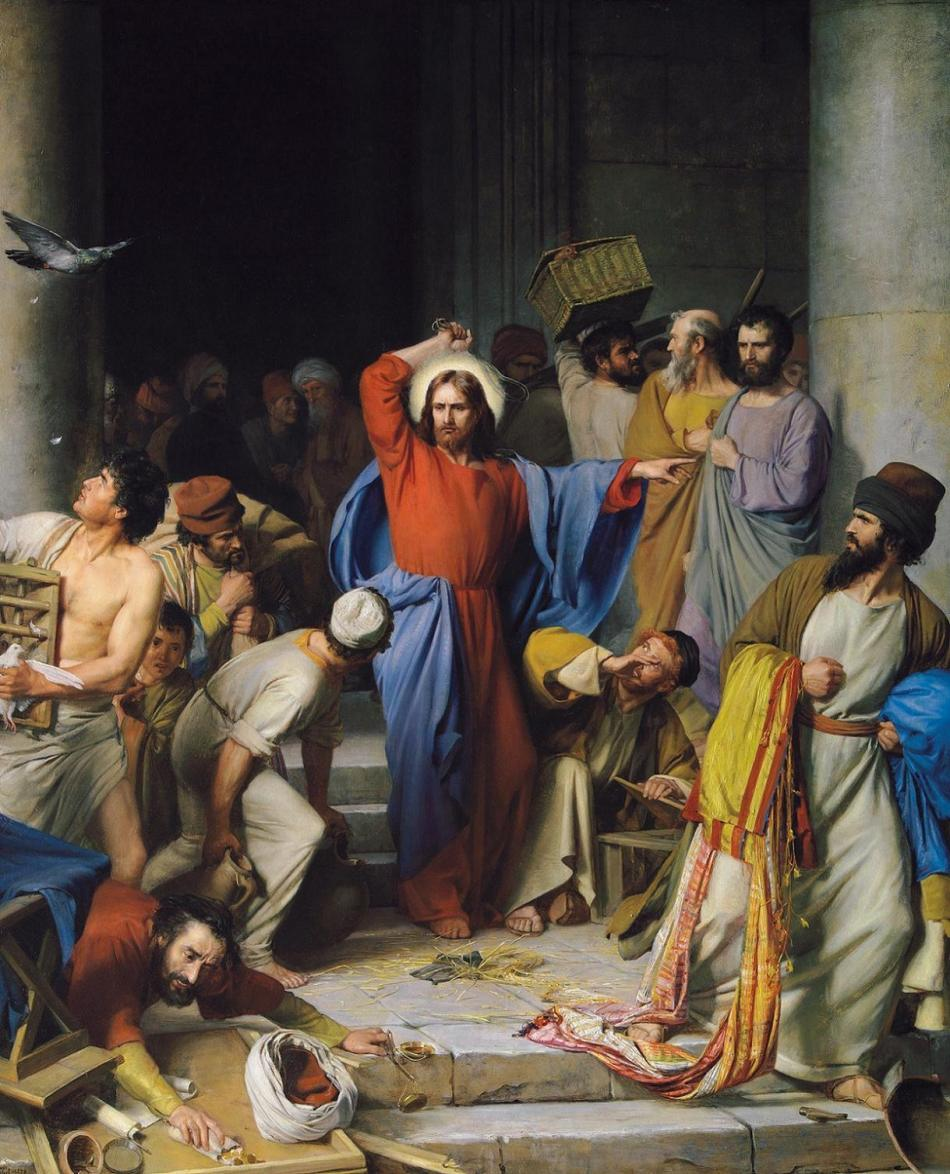
Jesus casting out the money changers in Herod's Temple

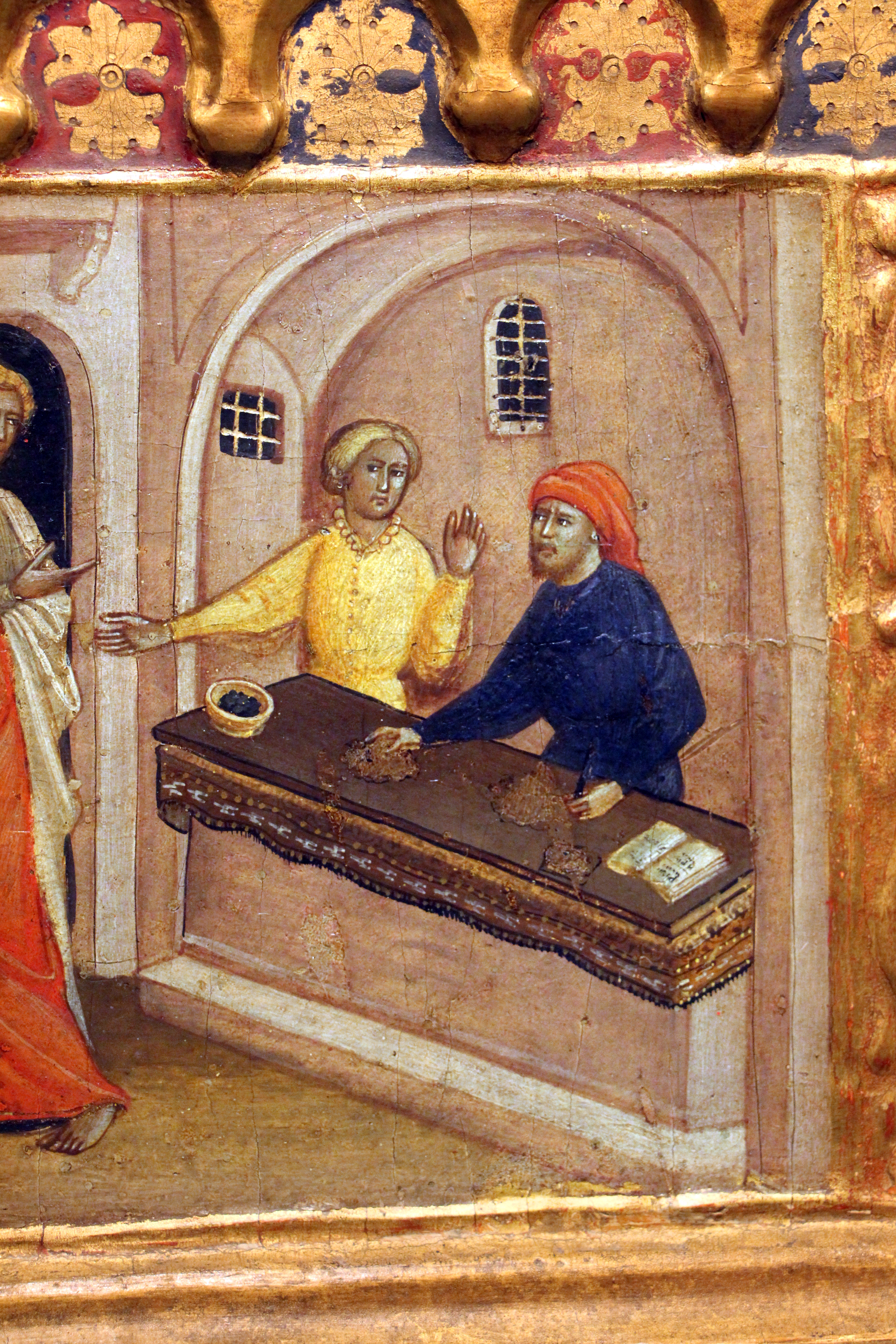
Money changer by Pietro di Miniato, 1412.

In ancient times in Jerusalem, pilgrims visiting the Jewish Temple on Jewish Holy Days would change some of their money from the standard Greek and Roman currency for Jewish and Tyrian money, the latter two the only currencies accepted as payments inside the Temple. With this Temple money the pilgrim would purchase a sacrificial animal, usually a pigeon or a lamb, in preparation for the following day's events.

During the Middle Ages in Europe, many cities and towns issued their own coins, often carrying the face of a ruler, such as the regional baron or bishop. When outsiders, especially traveling merchants, visited towns for a market fair, it became necessary to exchange foreign coins to local ones at local money changers. Money changers would assess a foreign coin for its type, wear and tear, and validity, then accept it as deposit, recording its value in local currency. The merchant could then withdraw the money in local currency to conduct trade or, more likely, keep it deposited: the money changer would act as a clearing facility.

As the size and operations of money changers grew they began to provide a lending facility, by adding the lending-fee to the foreign exchange rates. Later the Knights Templar provided this service to pilgrims traveling to and from the Holy Land.

In the Middle East, money changers, known as sarraf, sayrafi, jahbadh, or hawaladars, played a pivotal role in the Islamic economy, particularly in adhering to Sharia’s prohibition of riba (interest). During the Islamic Golden Age, they facilitated currency exchange in bustling trade hubs like Baghdad and Damascus, supporting long-distance commerce across the Muslim world. The hawala system, managed by hawaladars, enabled interest-free money transfers based on trust, a practice still prevalent today. Money changers also supported Sharia-compliant financial structures like mudarabah and musharaka, which emphasized profit-and-loss sharing over interest. In the 20th century, as Islamic banking emerged, money changers adapted to stricter interest-free models, contributing to financial stability and ethical investments in Muslim-majority regions.

== See also ==
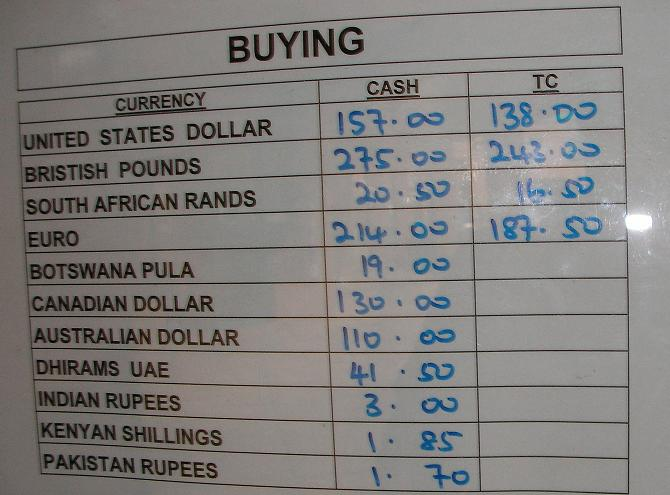
The exchange rates list for Malawian kwacha. Note how traveler's cheques are given a lower value than regular banknotes.

- Bank of Amsterdam
- Central bank
