= Giovanni Battista Naldini =

Italian painter

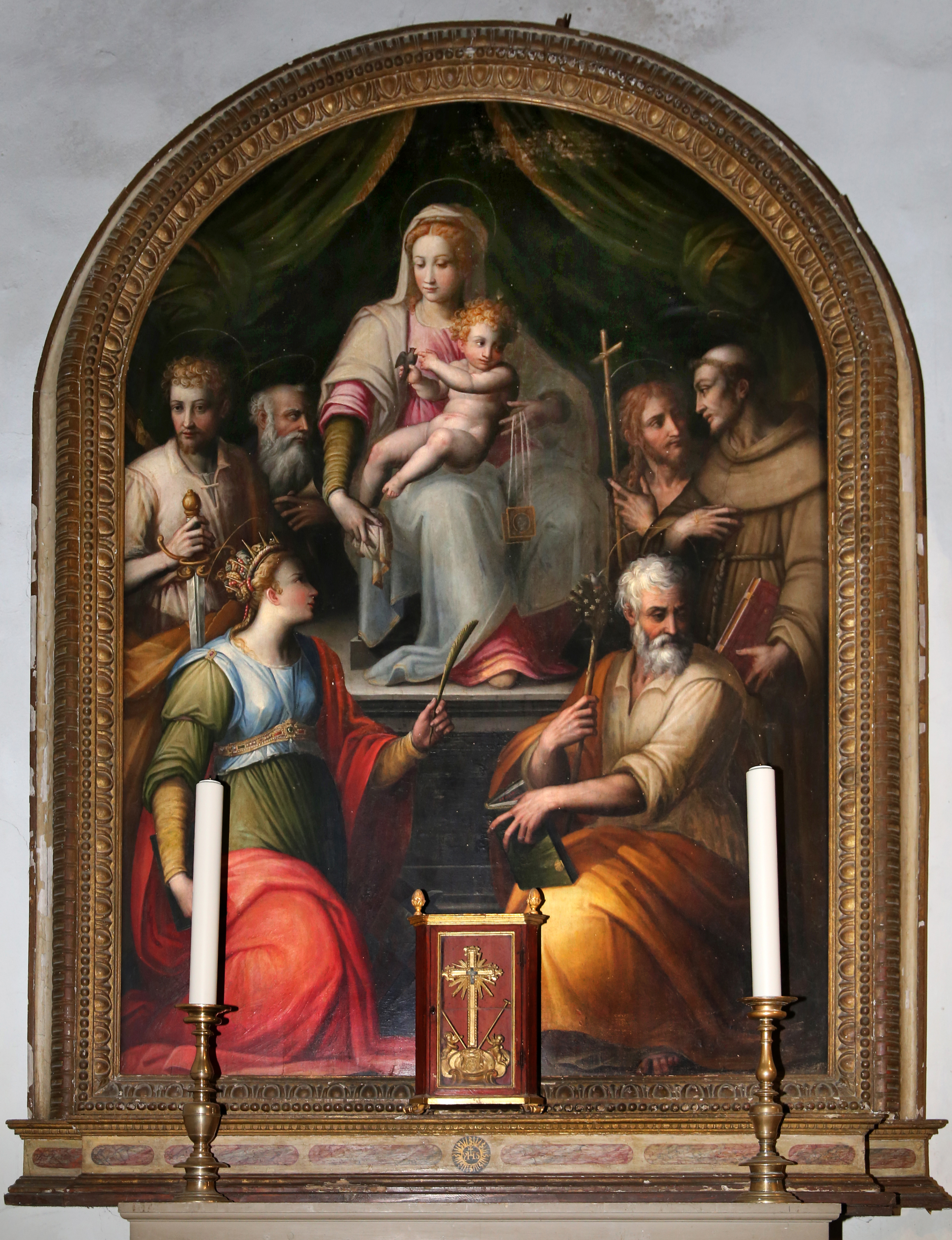
Madonna and Child with saints, 1550s, Dicomano, near Florence

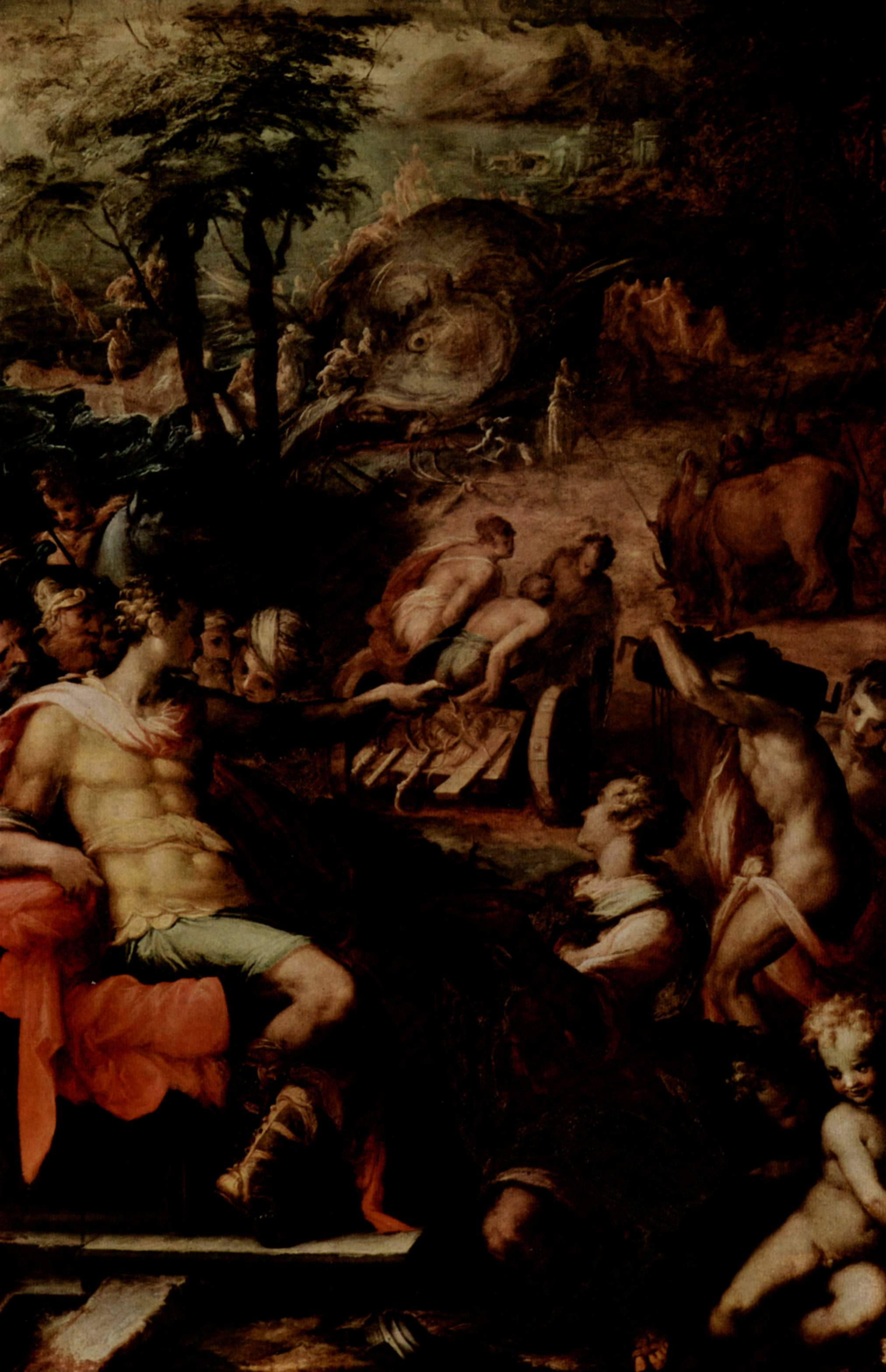
Giovanni Battista Naldini, The Collection of Ambergris, 1570–1573

Giovanni Battista Naldini (1535–1591) was an Italian painter in a late-Mannerist style, active in Florence and Rome.

== Biography ==
His first apprenticeship (1549–1557) was in the studio of Jacopo Pontormo. He went from Rome for a number of months following 1560, and was recruited to work for Giorgio Vasari in 1562. He painted two crowded, mannerist canvases for the Studiolo of Francesco I in the Palazzo Vecchio: the Allegory of Dreams and the Gathering of Ambergris.

He supplied altarpieces to Santa Maria Novella and Santa Croce. He painted an altarpiece of Calling of Saint Matthew for the Salviati Chapel in San Marco, where he worked alongside Francesco Morandini. Ultimately, he is described by Freedberg as displaying work distantly derivative from the style of Andrea del Sarto, as expressed by Naldini's two mentors and Sarto's two pupils: Pontormo and Vasari. Among his pupils were the Cavalieri Francesco Curradi, Cosimo Gamberucci. and Cosimo Duti.

Naldini painted the cycle of frescoes concerning St John the Baptist in Rome, in the chapel of the saint in the church of Trinità dei Monti in Rome in 1580. The chapel, which was added to the original church during works for the new facade, was built in 1570 by the architect Giovanni Antonio Dosio. In 1573 the Florentine banker Giovanni Battista Altoviti acquired the patronage and dedicated the chapel to St. John the Baptist, the Patron Saint of his city. In about 1580 Giovanni Battista Naldini created the frescoes that are still well-preserved today.

He did a side-altar at San Giovanni Battista Decollato, Rome, the showcase there for the Florentine high Maniera style.
