= Giovanni Bizzelli =

Italian painter (1556–1607/1612)

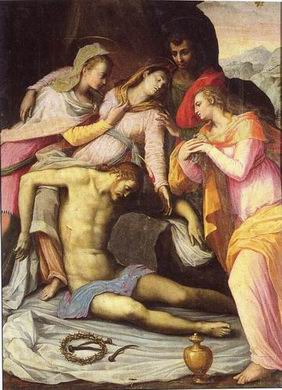
Deposition of Christ, pieve of Sant'Ippolito in Vernio.

Giovanni Bizzelli (1556 – around 1 August 1607 or 1612) was an Italian painter of the late-Mannerist period. He was a pupil of Alessandro Allori. He afterwards went to Rome. On his return to Florence he helped Antonio Tempesta in the decoration of the vaults of the Uffizi Corridor.

== Works ==
- Pietà (1579, Pieve di San'Ippolito)
- Annunciation (1584, Uffizi, Florencia)
- St Macario enthroned with St Jerome and St Francis (1585–1590), Sant'Angelo a Lecore church, Signa
- Joanna of Austria with her son Philip de Medici (1586, Uffizi)
- Adoration of the Shepherds (Colegio del Corpus Christi, Valencia)
- Penitent Magdalen (Museum of Fine Arts, Valencia)
- Pentecost (c. 1590), San Pietro a Grignano church, Grignano, neighborhood of Prato
- Coronation of Virgin by Trinity with Saints John the Baptist, John Evangelist, Romualdo e Benedetto (1600), San Giovanni Evangelista Monastery, Pratovecchio
- Martyrdom of St James the Great (1601) Santa Maria Maddalena de' Pazzi, Florence
- Baptism of St Augustine (1603), Chiesa di Sant'Agostino, Prato
- Frescoes at Santa Maria Maddalena de' Pazzi church, Borgo Pinti, Florence

== Gallery ==
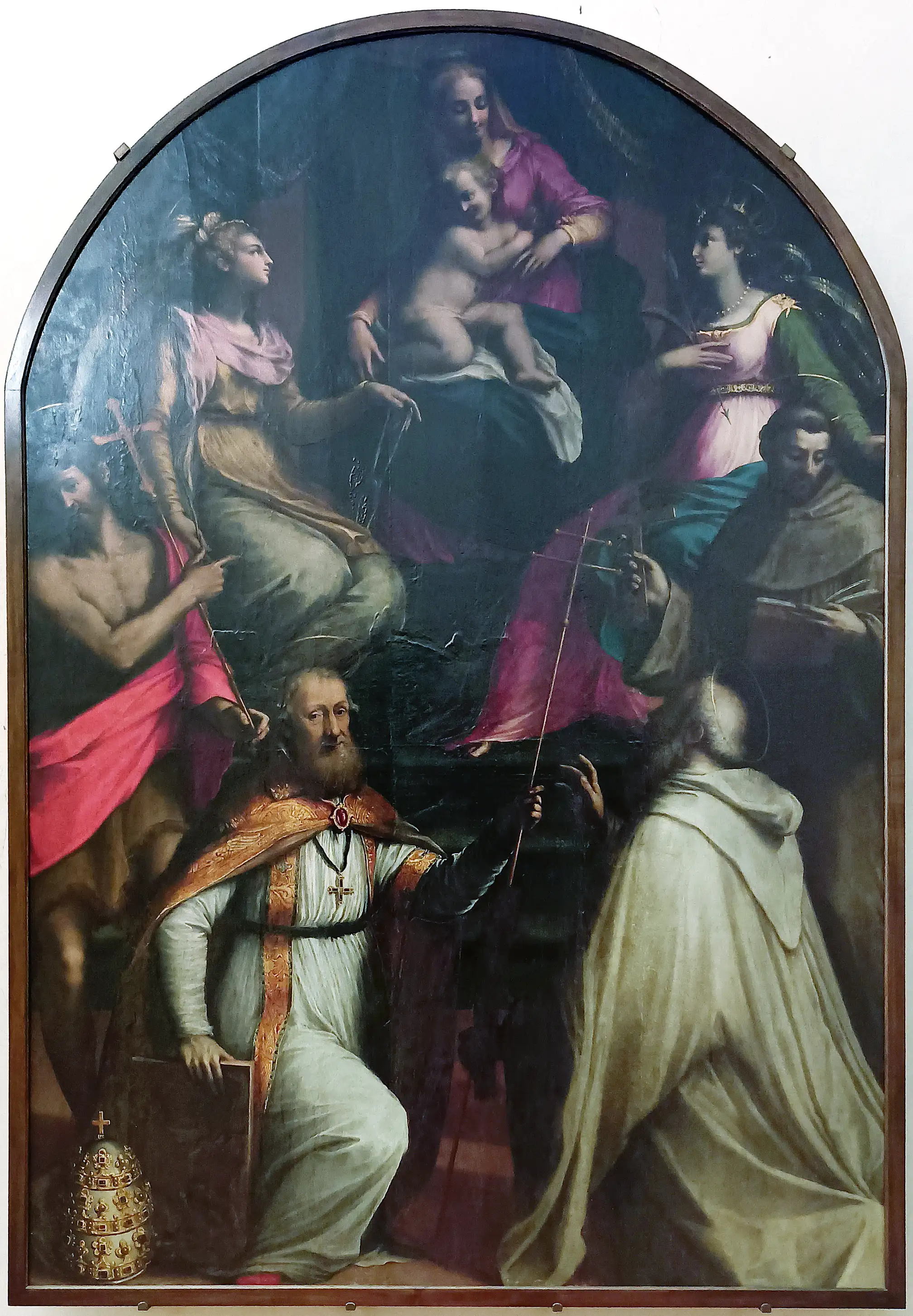
Madonna in Glory with Saints Agatha, Ursula, John the Baptist, Francis, Gregory and Bernard, Cenacolo di Andrea del Sarto, Florence, Italy

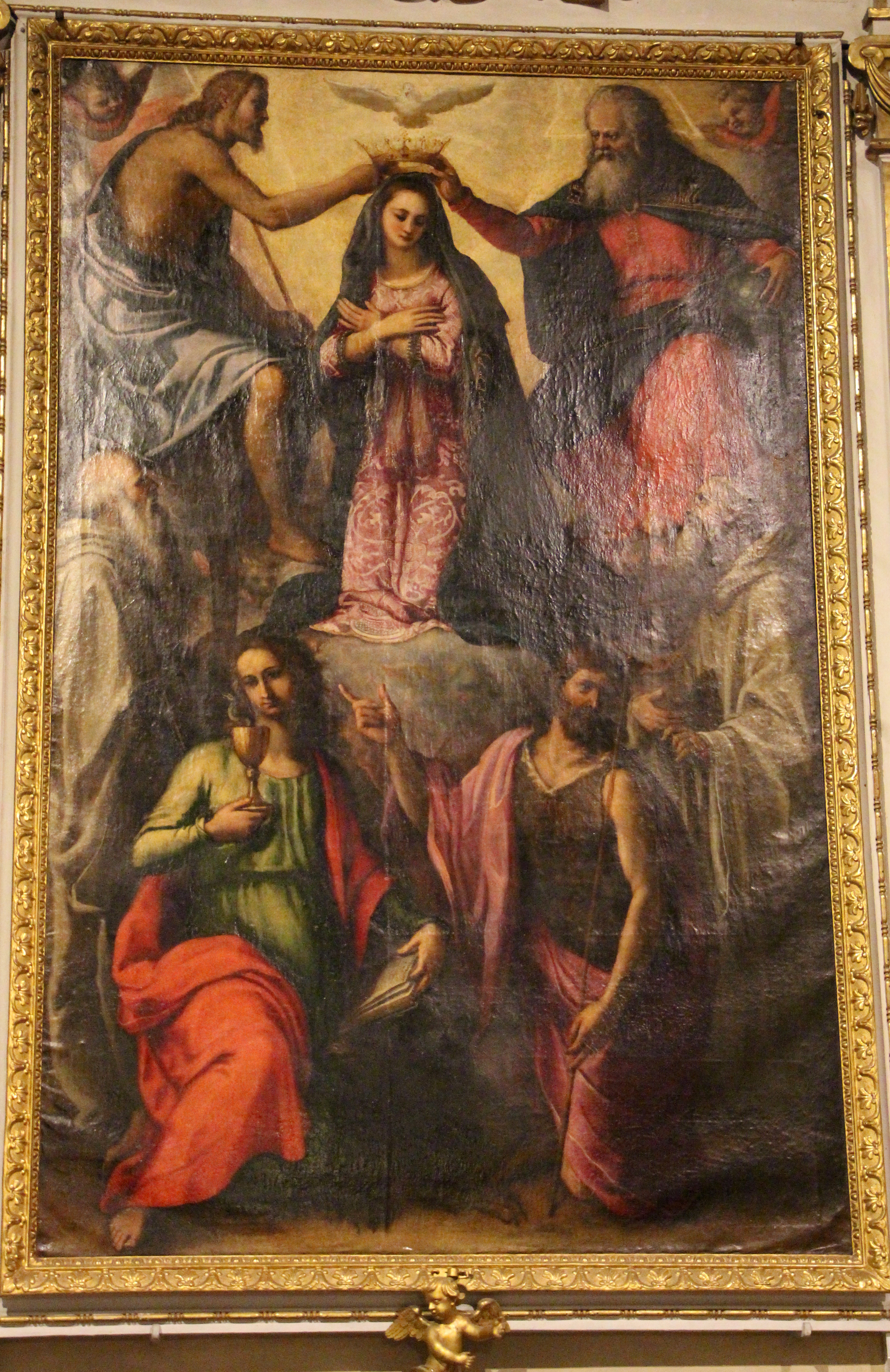
Coronation of the Virgin by the Holy Trinity and Saints, 1600

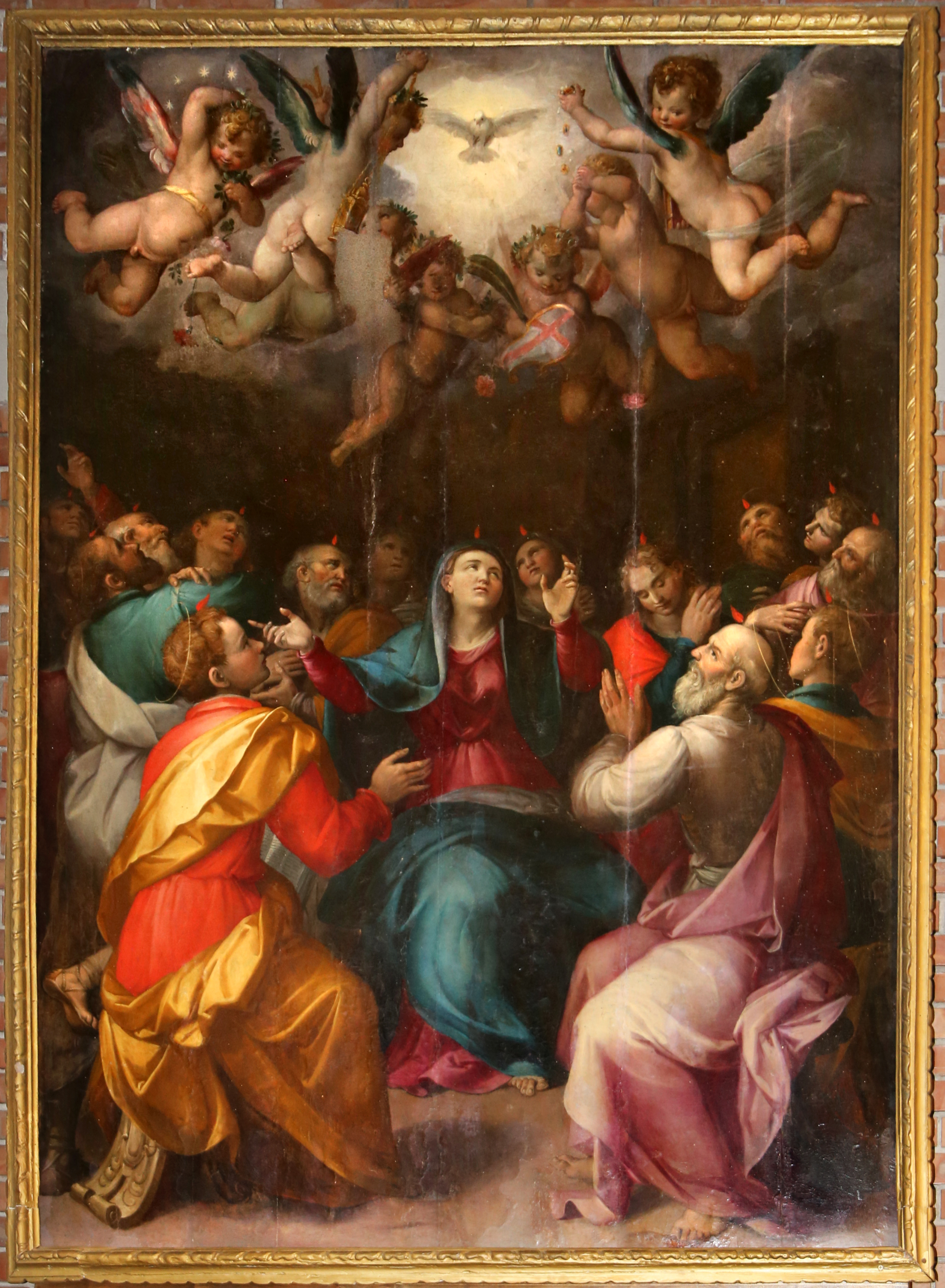
In the Company of the Holy Spirit, 1590 - 1610
