= Leonardo del Tasso =

Italian sculptor

Leonardo del Tasso (16th-century) was an Italian sculptor active mainly in Florence.

He was a pupil of Andrea Contucci, called il Sansovino. He sculpted for the churches of Sant'Ambrogio un San Sebastiano, and Santa Maria Maddalena dei Pazzi in Florence. Giorgio Vasari spoke of the sculptor.
