= Francesco Morandini =

Italian painter

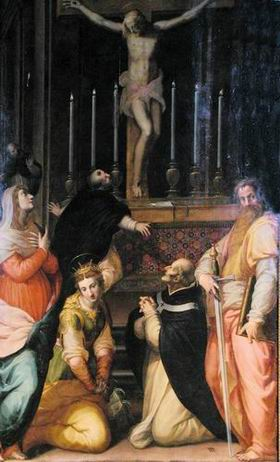
Crucifixion with Saint Thomas (c. 1590), church of San Domenico, Prato.

Francesco Morandini (c. 1544–1597) was an Italian painter active in Florence, working in a Mannerist style. He was also called il Poppi after his native town. He was a pupil of Vincenzo Borghini, and later he was Giorgio Vasari's assistant for many years.

He participated in the Vincenzo Borghini and Giorgio Vasari-directed decoration of the Studiolo of Francesco I with two canvases: one relating a Alexander and Campaspe (1571) and the other depicting a Foundry (1572). He also painted an altarpiece on the Tobias and the Angel for the church of San Francesco in Prato. In 1584–1585, he worked in the Salviati Chapel in San Marco alongside Giovanni Battista Naldini and others; his contribution is a canvas of Christ healing the Lepers.
