= San Domenico, Prato =

Church building in Prato, Italy

Coordinates: 43.8815°N 11.0941°E

Chiesa di San Domenico
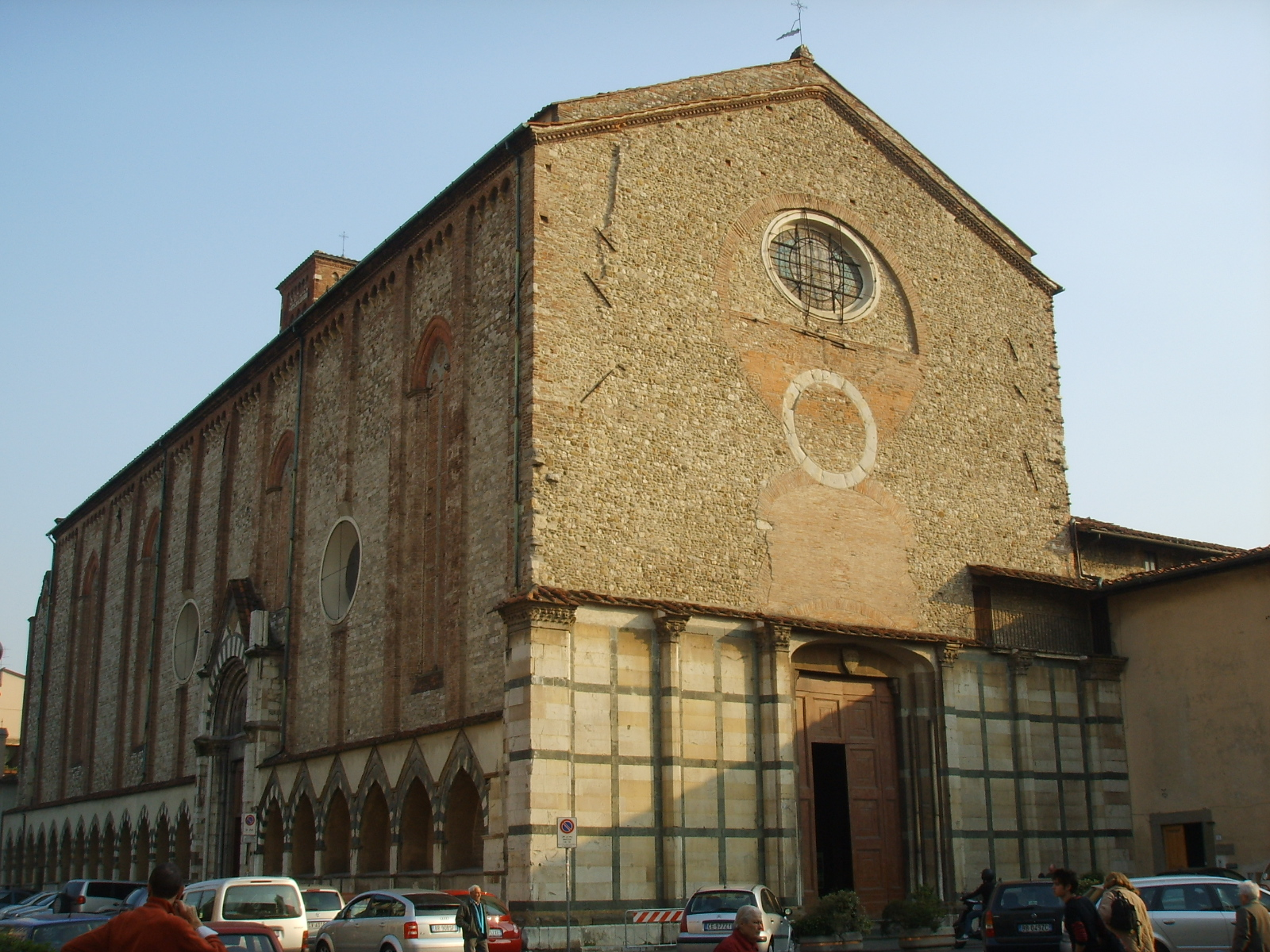
- Facade

Religion
- Affiliation: Roman Catholic

Location
- Location: Prato, Italy
- Interactive map of Chiesa di San Domenico

Architecture
- Type: Church
- Style: Romanesque
- Groundbreaking: 1300 ca.
- Completed: 1700 ca.

San Domenico is a Romanesque-style Roman Catholic church in Prato, region of Tuscany, central Italy.

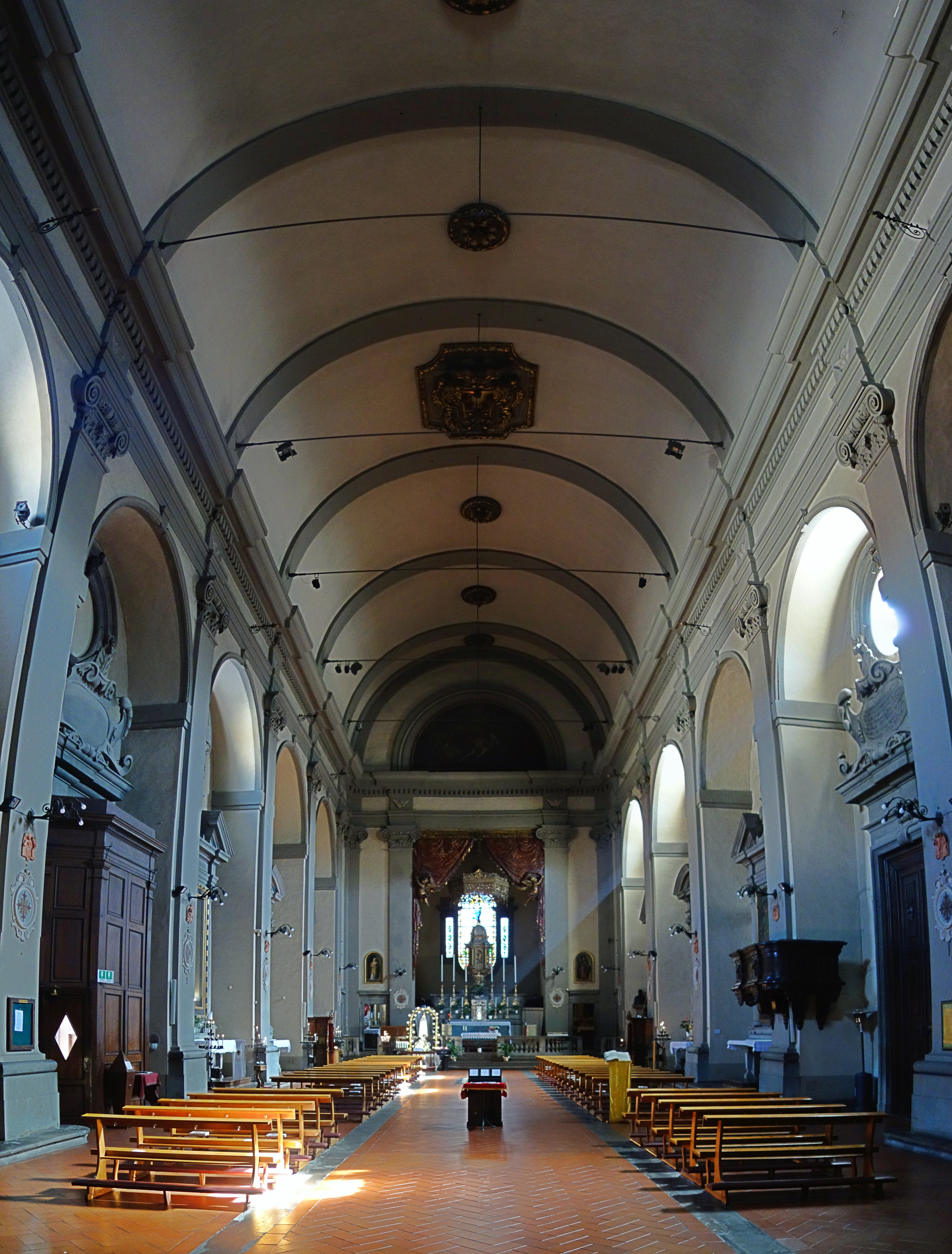
The interior of the church

== History ==
Construction of the church and adjacent monastery was begun in 1282, and continued until 1325. The bell-tower was added in 1313. Only the first story of the church facade was faced with green serpentinite and white marble, while the superior portions remain in unadorned brick. The external arches are attributed to Giovanni Pisano. The portal of the church has heraldic symbols recalling the patronage of Cardinal Niccolò Albertini for its construction.

The interior houses a 14th-century painted wooden crucifix and an Annunciation by Matteo Rosselli (1578-1650). The cloister of the convent was built in 1478–80. A building of the monastery serves today as the Museo di pittura murale and shows works by Niccolò Gerini, Agnolo Gaddi and workshop, Pietro di Miniato, Girolamo Ristori and Giovanni di Agostino.

== Images ==
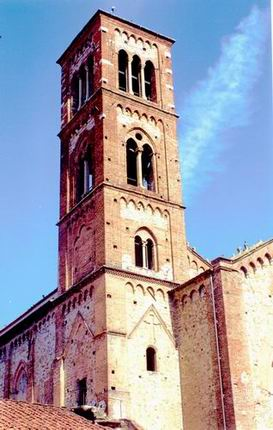
Bell-tower of San Domenico

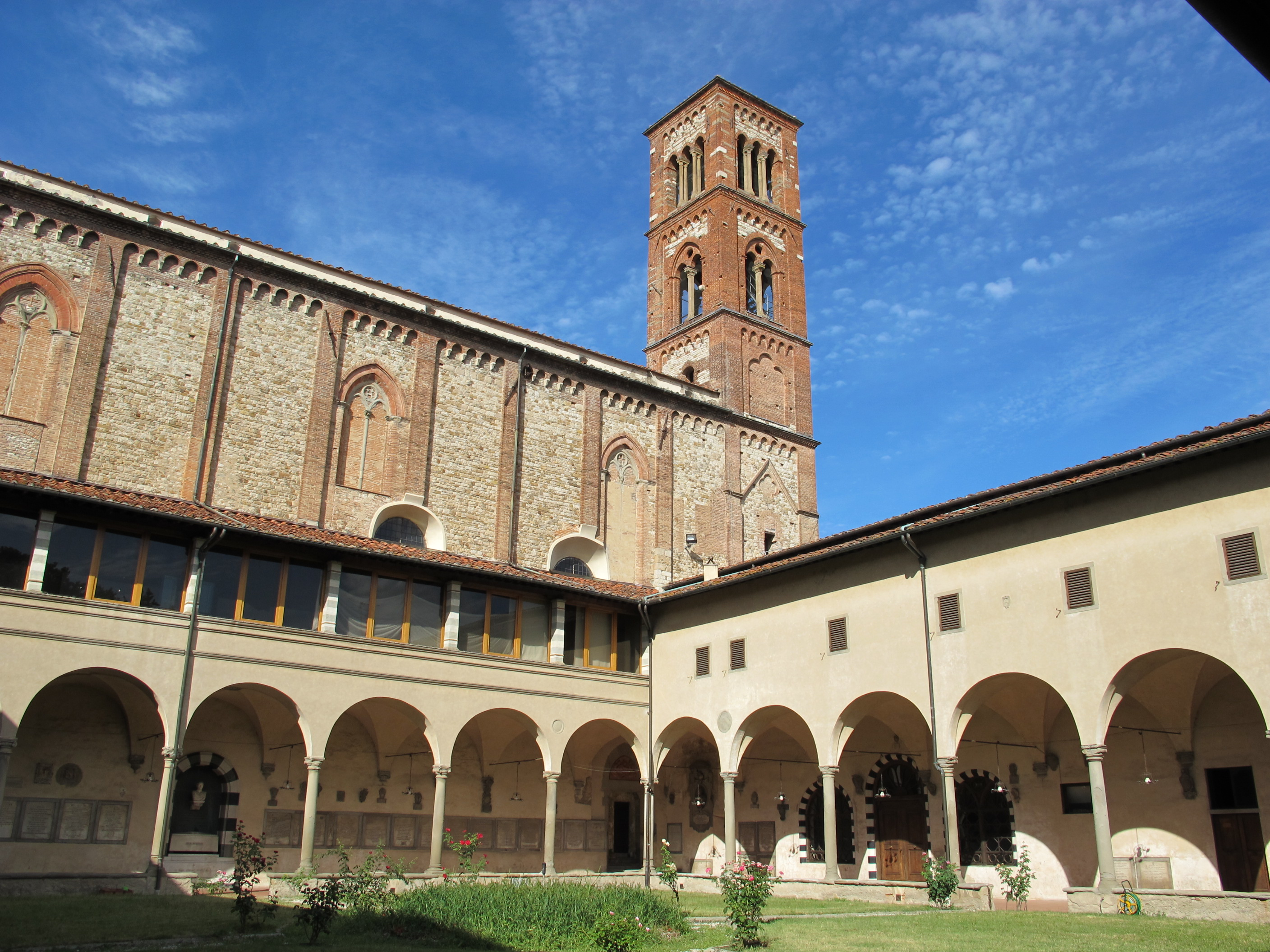
The cloister

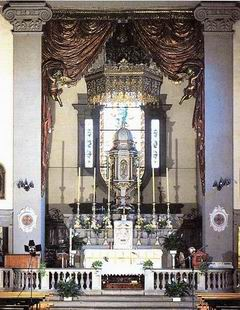
Main altar

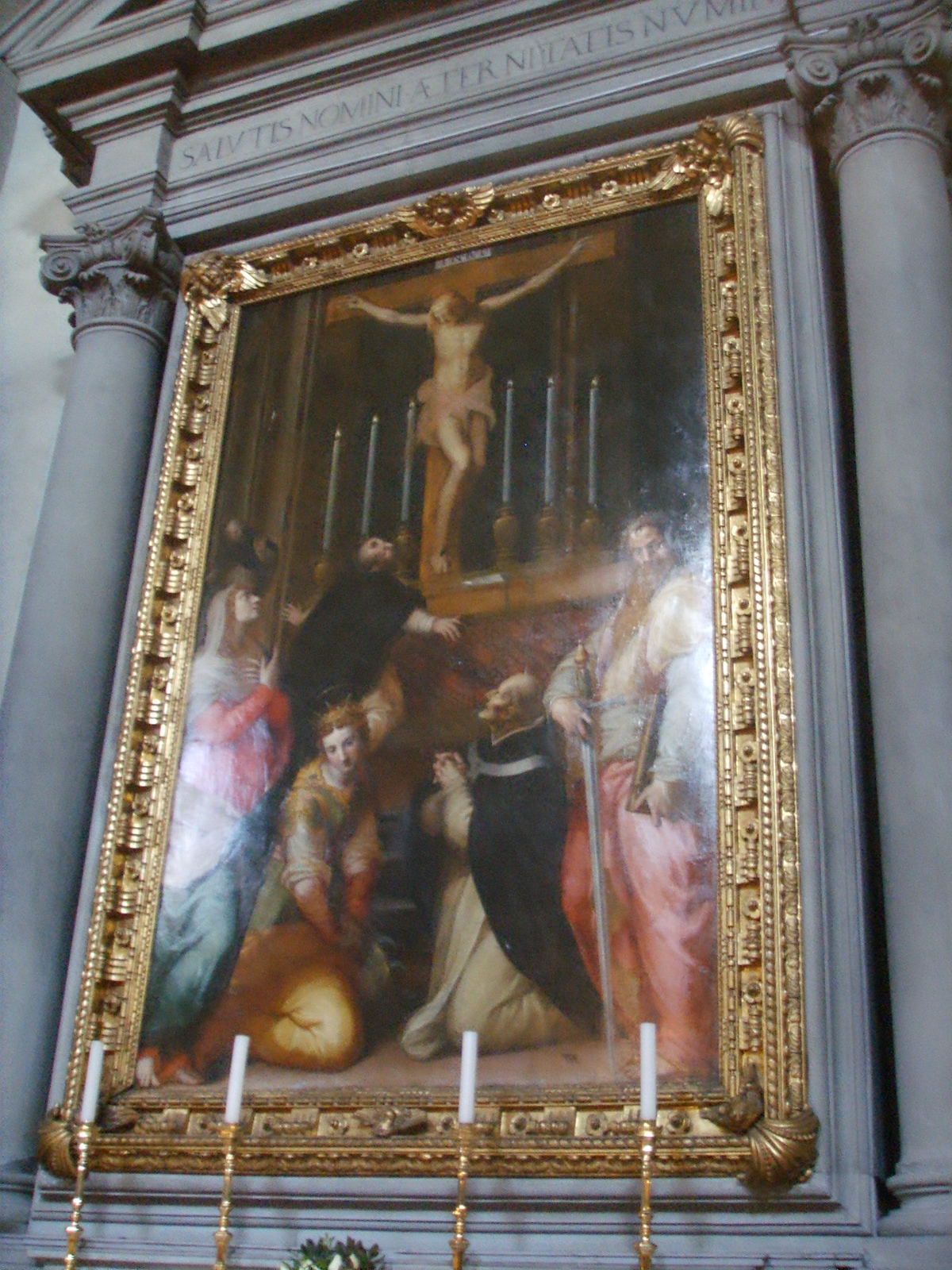
Crucifixion by il Poppi

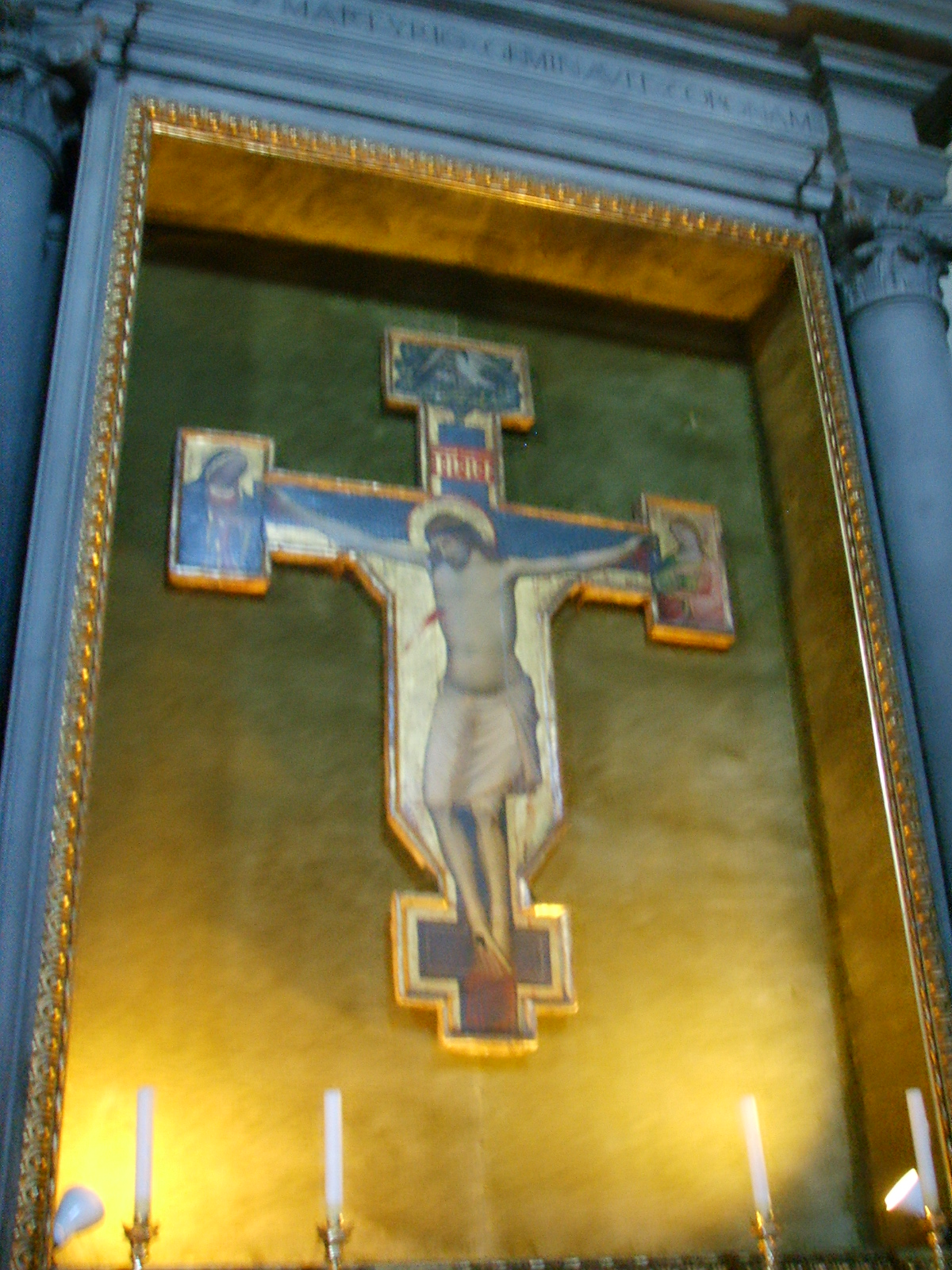
Crucifix by Lorenzo di Niccolò di Pietro Gerini
