= Santa Maria Maddalena dei Pazzi =

Renaissance-style Roman Catholic Church

Coordinates: 43°46′27″N 11°15′52″E

Church of Santa Maria Maddalena dei Pazzi
- Chiesa di Santa Maria Maddalena dei Pazzi
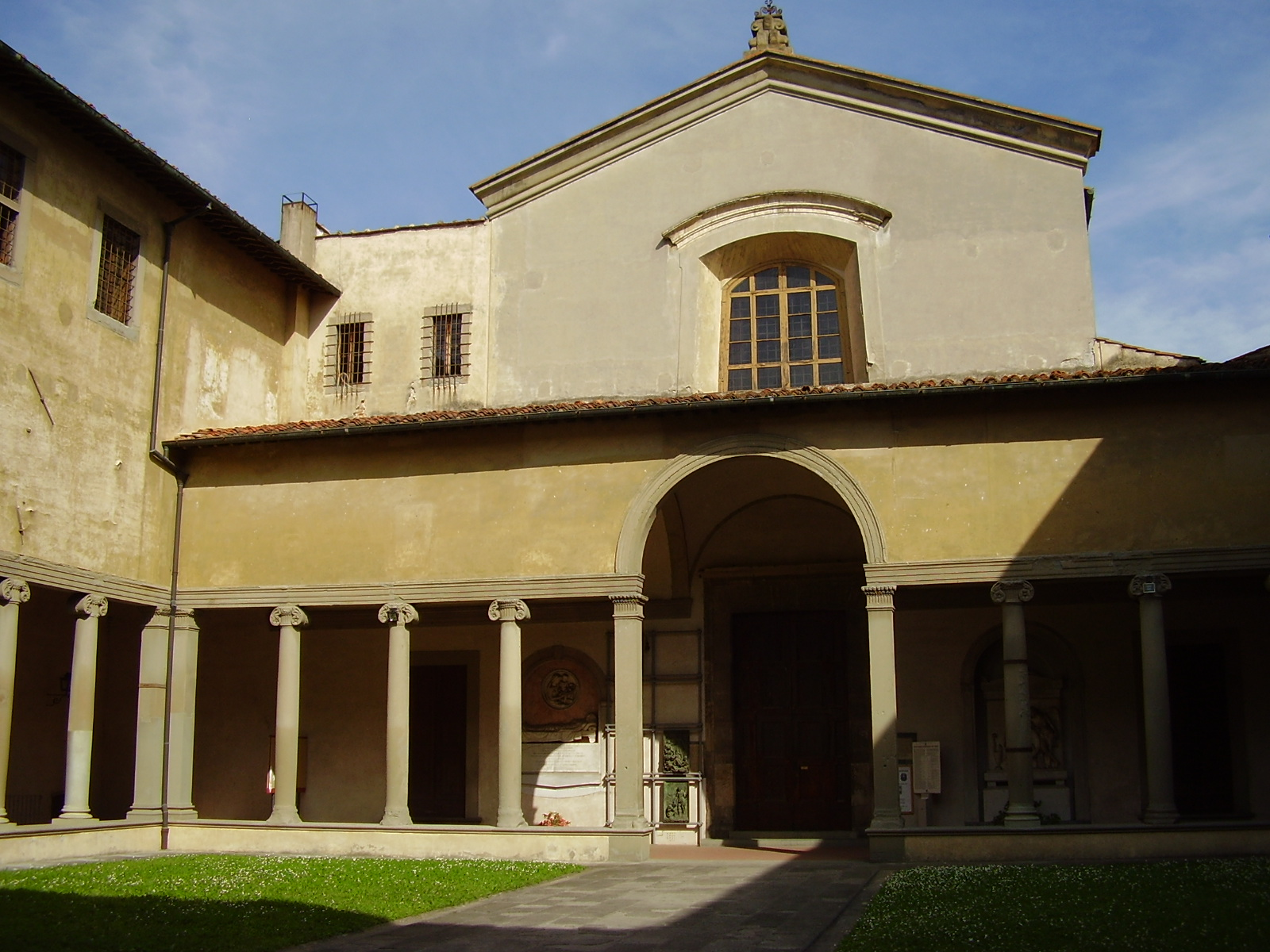
- The entrance with the portico

Religion
- Affiliation: Roman Catholic
- Province: Florence

Location
- Location: Florence, Italy
- Interactive map of Church of Santa Maria Maddalena dei Pazzi

Architecture
- Type: Church

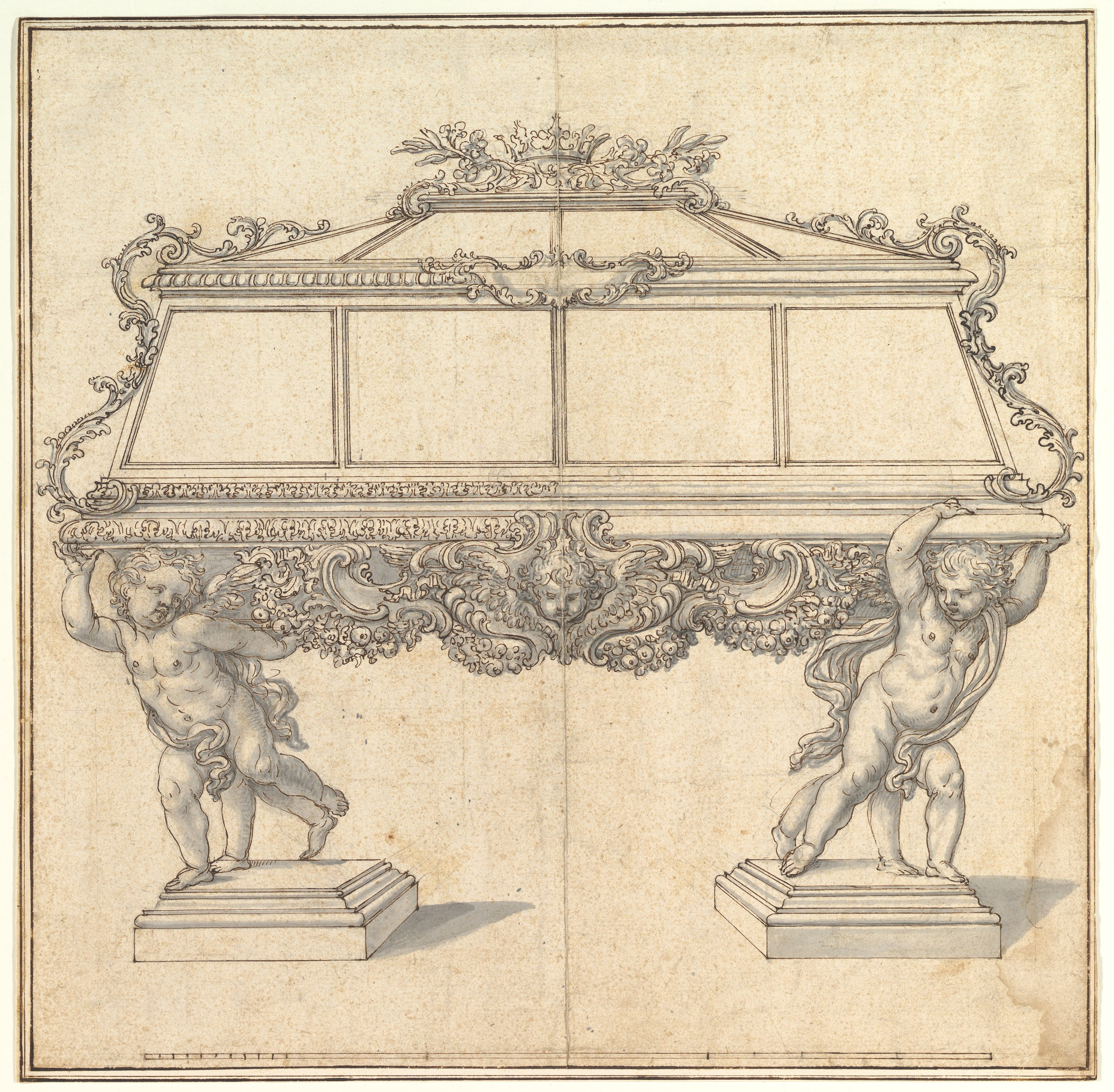
Giovanni Battista Foggini, Design for a sarcophagus for the Church of Santa Maria Maddalena de' Pazzi, Florence

Santa Maria Maddalena dei Pazzi is a Renaissance-style Roman Catholic church and a former convent located in Borgo Pinti in central Florence, Italy.

== History ==
The Pazzi name was added after the Carmelite order nun Maria Maddalena de' Pazzi, canonized in 1669, whose family patronized the church. The original convent had been dedicated to Saint Mary Magdalene delle Convertite, the patron of once fallen, now converted women. The Cistercian order from Badia a Settimo took control of the site in 1332 and moved to it in 1442, while the convent was transferred to San Donato in Polverosa. However, the church and chapter house were rebuilt between 1481 and 1500, with initial designs in 1492 by Giuliano da Sangallo.

The 13th-century interiors were redecorated in the 17th and early 18th centuries, which removed the altarpieces by masters such as Botticelli, Perugino, Lorenzo di Credi, Domenico Ghirlandaio, and Raffaellino del Garbo. They were replaced by new ones from minor masters such as Carlo Portelli, Alfonso Boschi, Domenico Puligo, Santi di Tito, and Francesco Curradi. In the chapter house is a fresco divided into three lunettes of the Crucifixion and Saints (1493–1496) by Pietro Perugino, commissioned by Dionisio and Giovanna Pucci.

The first chapel to the right of the entrance is the Cappella del Giglio (Chapel of Saint Mary of the Lily), frescoed with depictions of Saints Philip Neri, Bernard, Nereus and Achilleus by the studio of Bernardino Poccetti, with an altarpiece by Domenico Passignano. The fourth chapel on the right has a stained glass window by Isabella, the daughter of Georges Henri Rouault. The choir chapel originally contained a fresco by Domenico Ghirlandaio but was rebuilt from 1685 to 1701 by Ciro Ferri and Pier Francesco Silvani. Ferri painted the altarpiece and Luca Giordano the flanking pieces. The statues of Penitence and Faith on the right were sculpted by Innocenzo Spinazzi, and those of Innocence and Religion on the left by Giovanni Monatauti. The bronze reliefs on the altar were made by Massimiliano Soldani-Benzi.

The interior also contains works by Giovanni and Cosimo Bizzelli, Jacopo Chiavistelli, Ottavio Vannini, Cosimo Rosselli, Cosimo Gamberucci, Leonardo del Tasso, Giuseppe Servolini, and Giuseppe Piattoli.

== Gallery ==
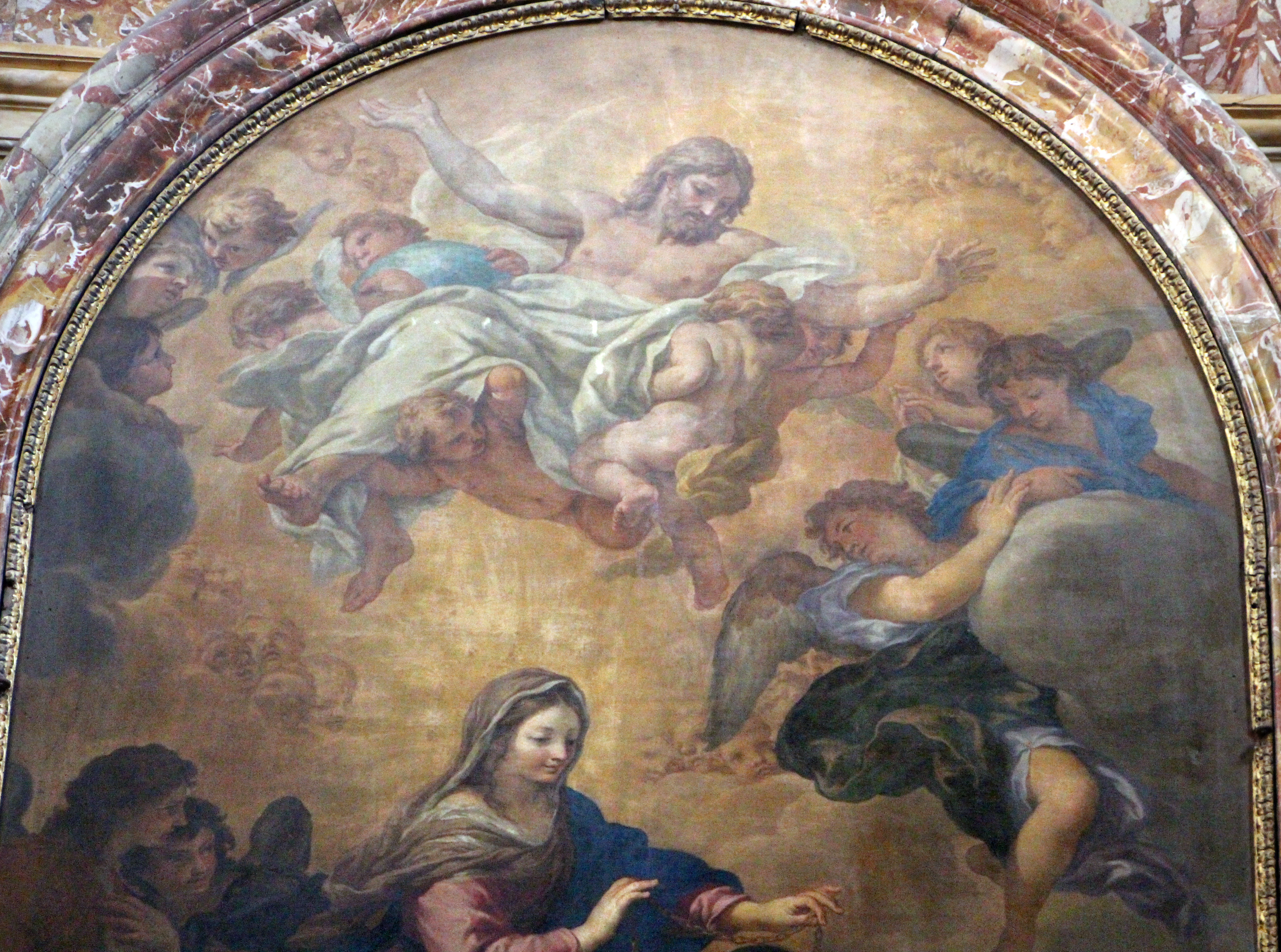
Virgin and Saint (detail) by Ciro Ferri

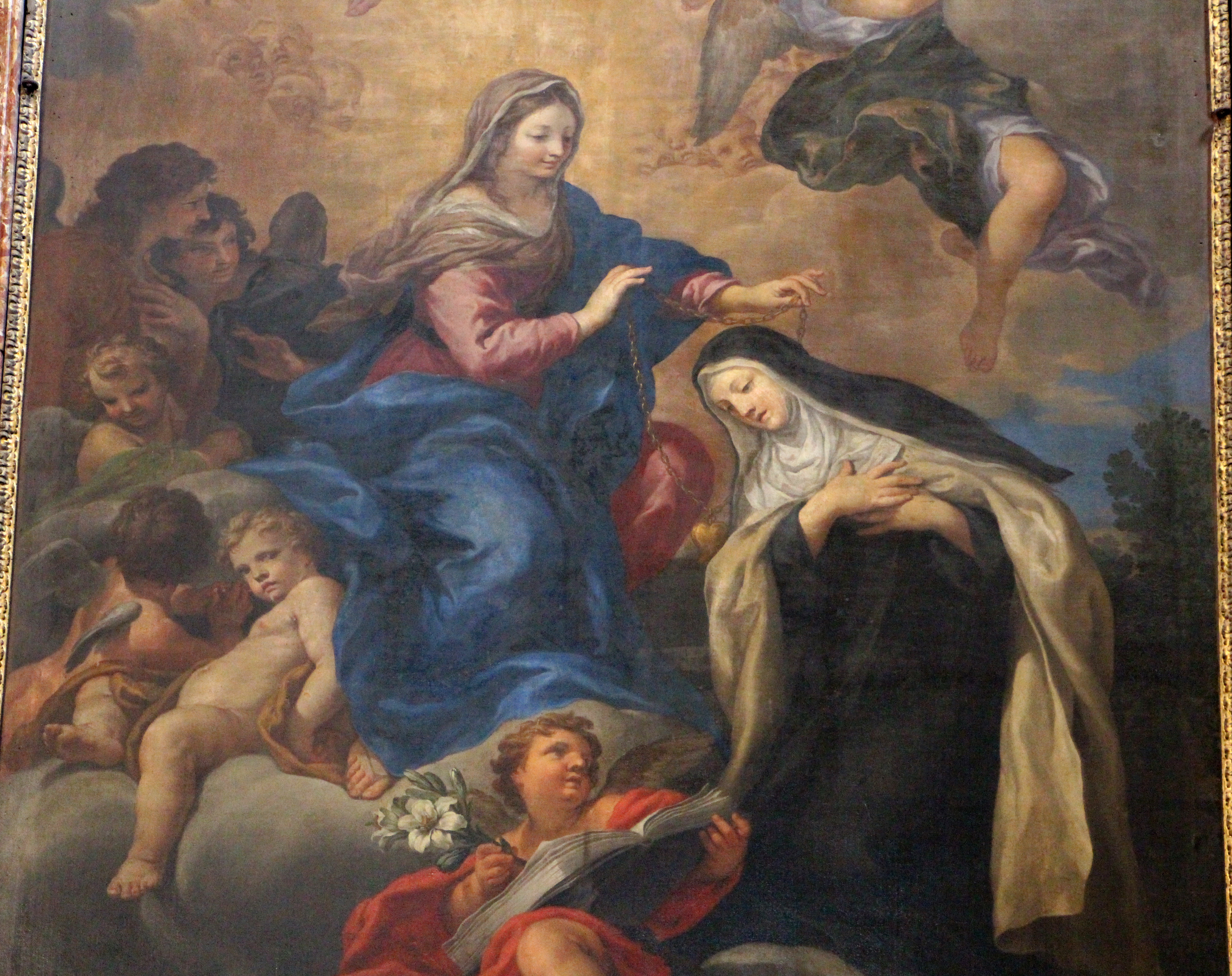
Virgin and Saint (detail)

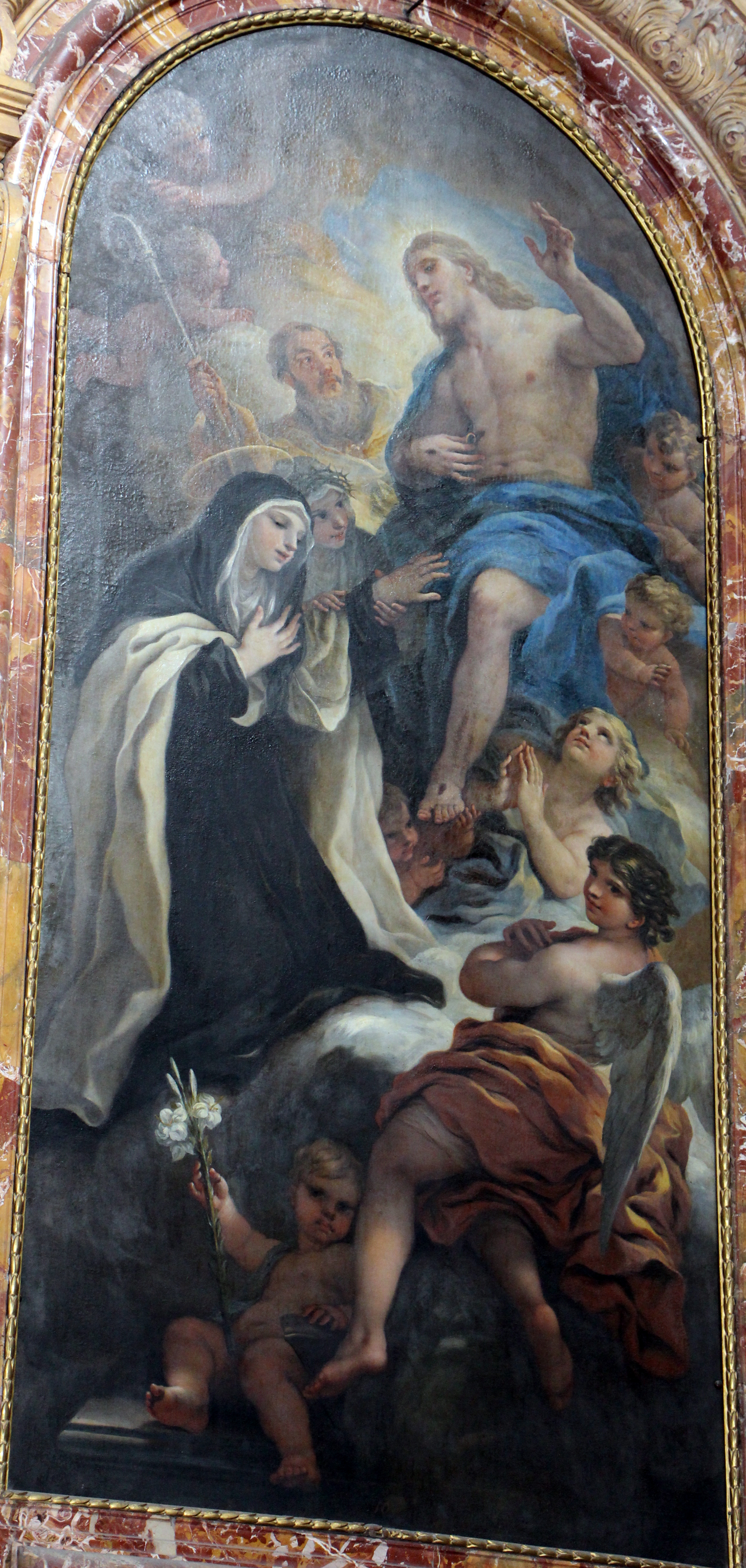
Jesus and Saint by Luca Giordano

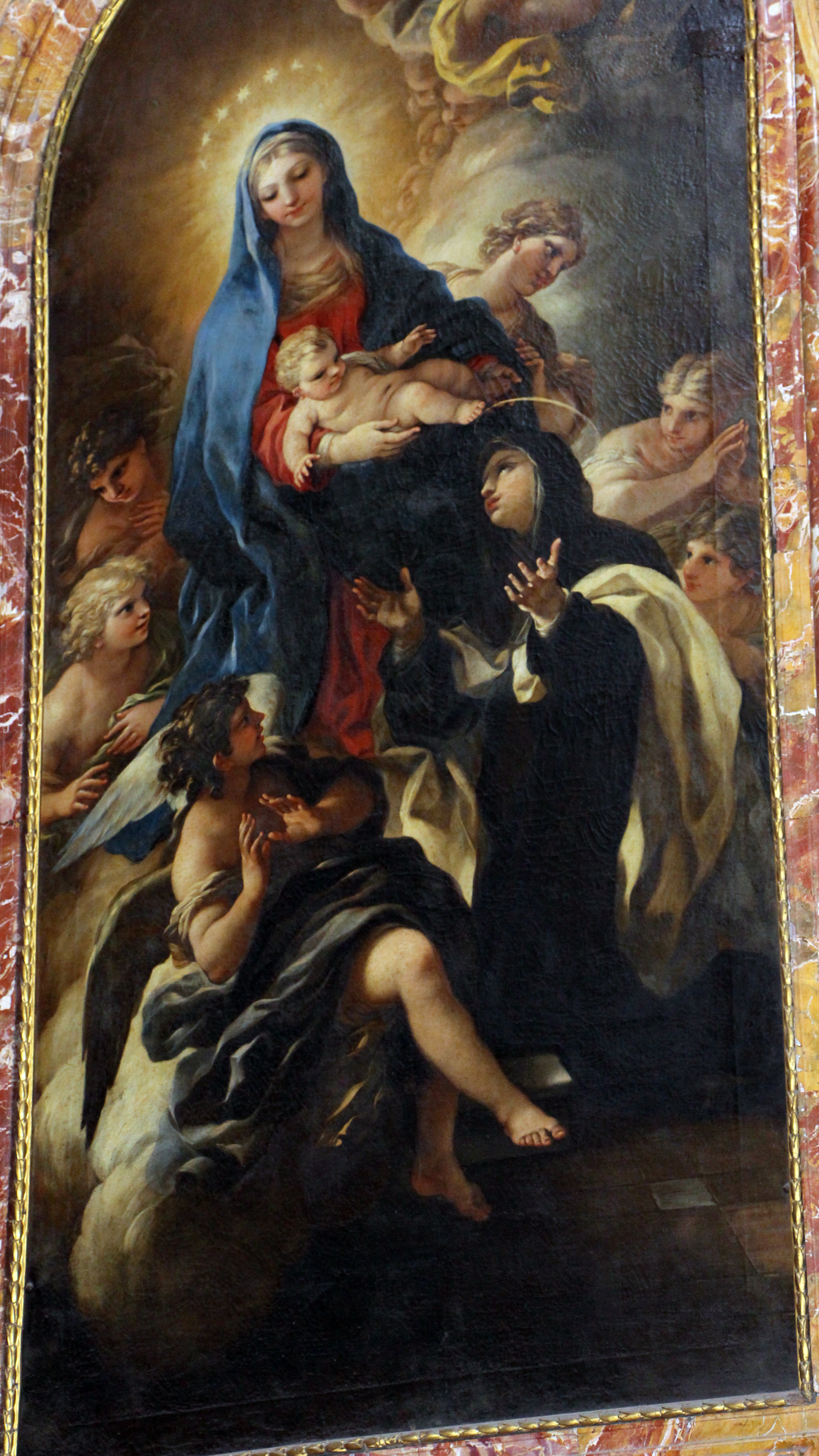
Virgin Presenting the Christ Child by Luca Giordano

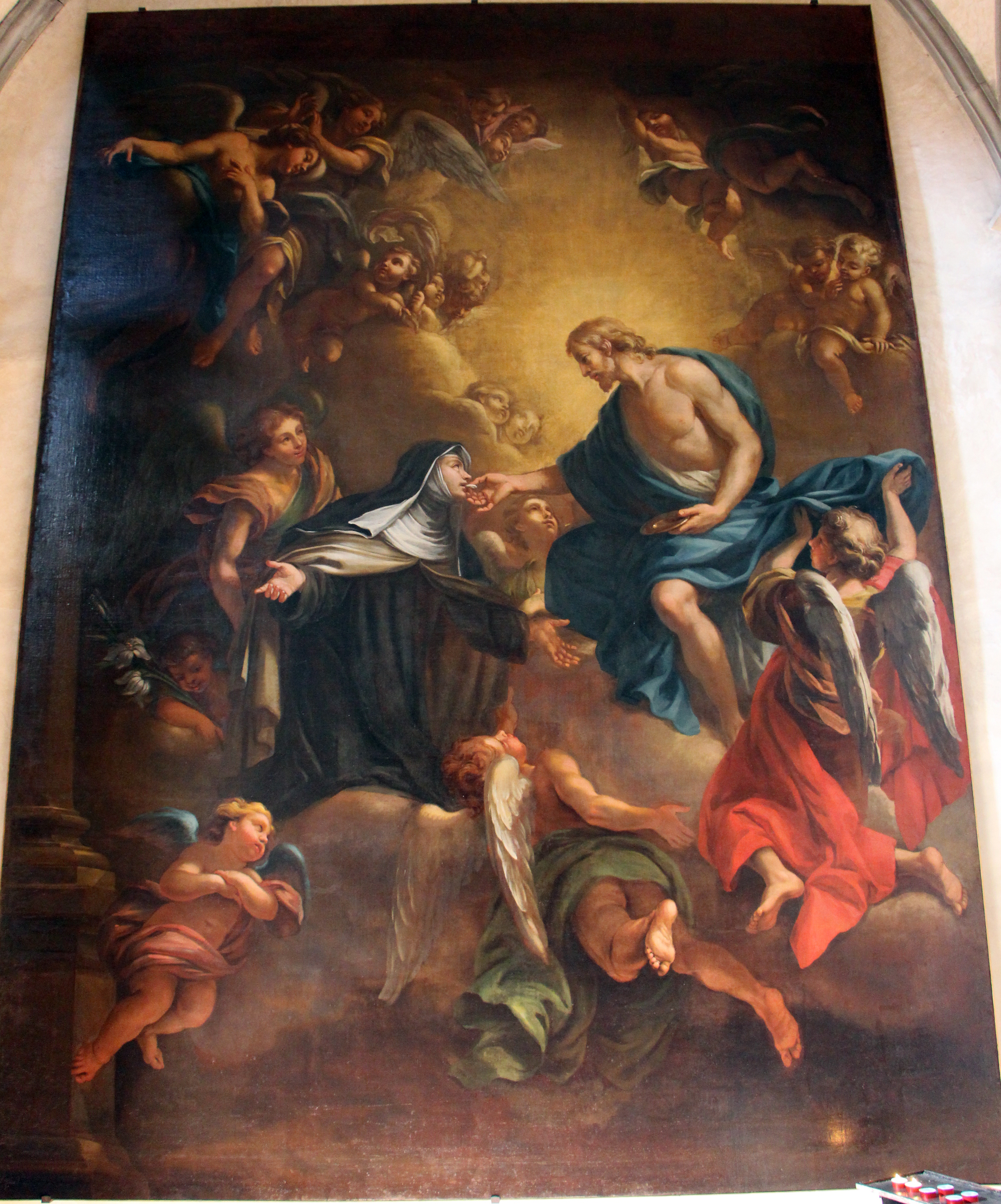
Communion by Giovanni Battista Cipriani

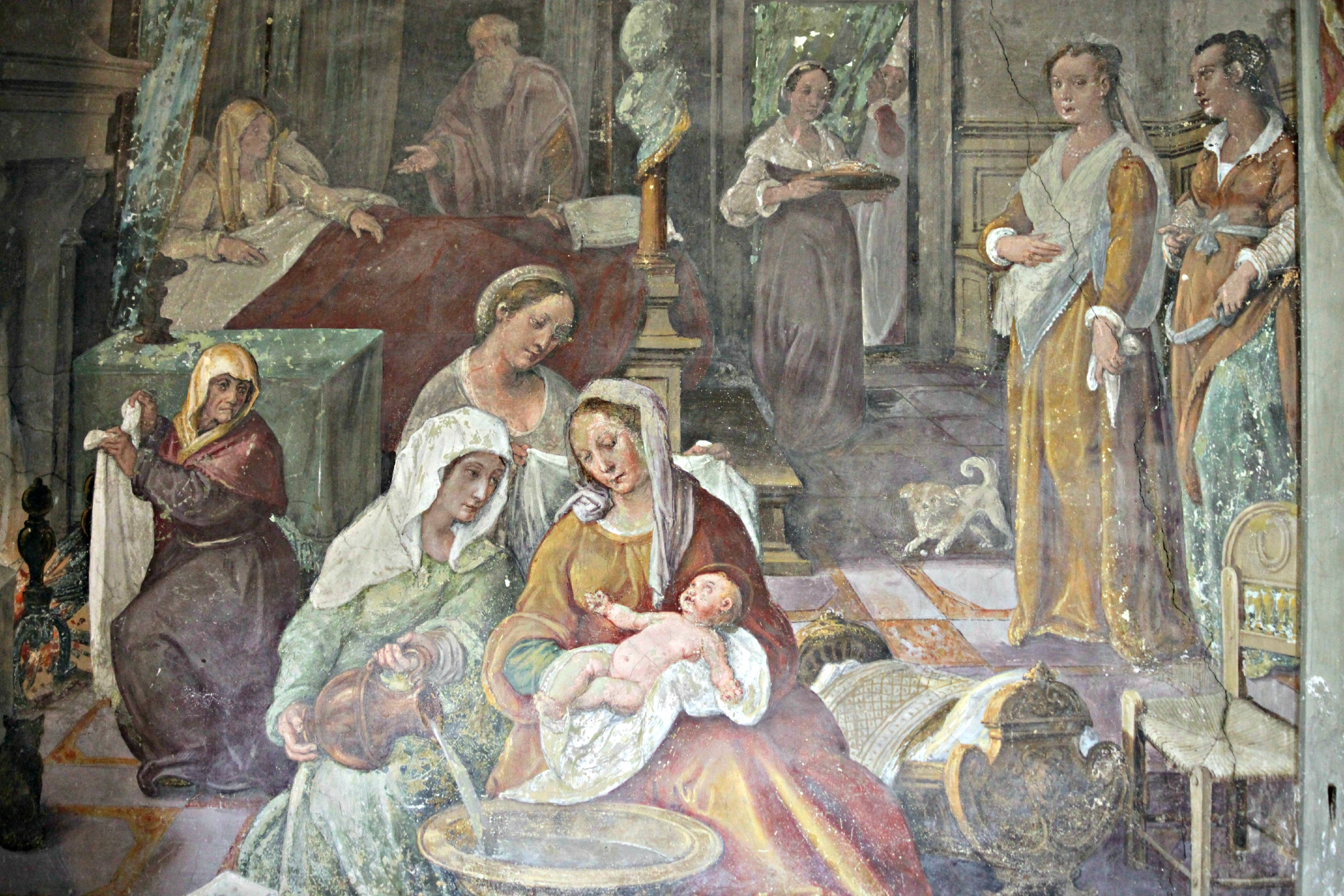
Nativity of the Virgin by Stradanus

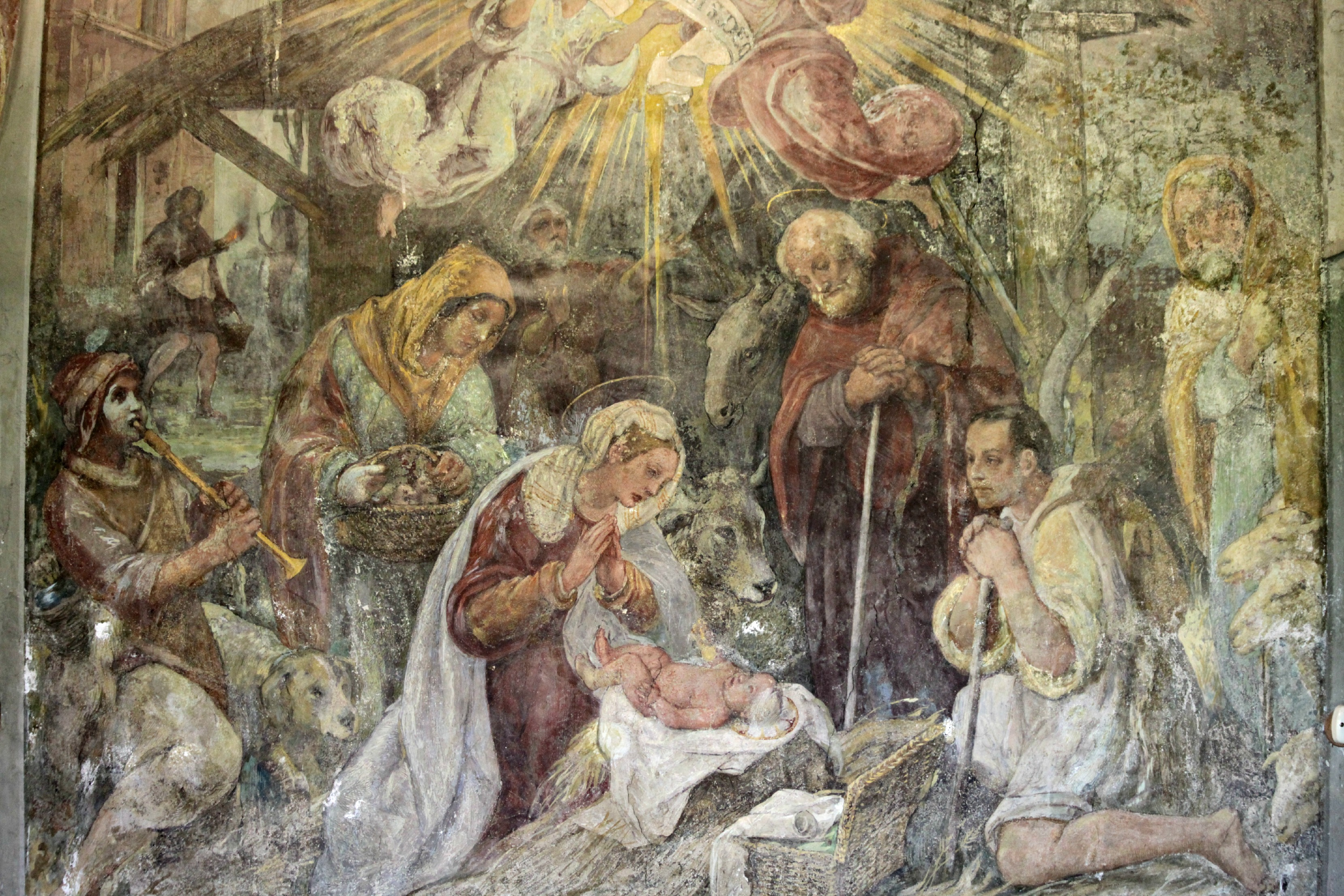
The Adoration of the Shepherds by Stradanus

== See also ==
- The Vision of Saint Bernard (Perugino)
