= Sant'Ippolito e Cassiano in Sant'Ippolito =

Church building in Vernio, Italy

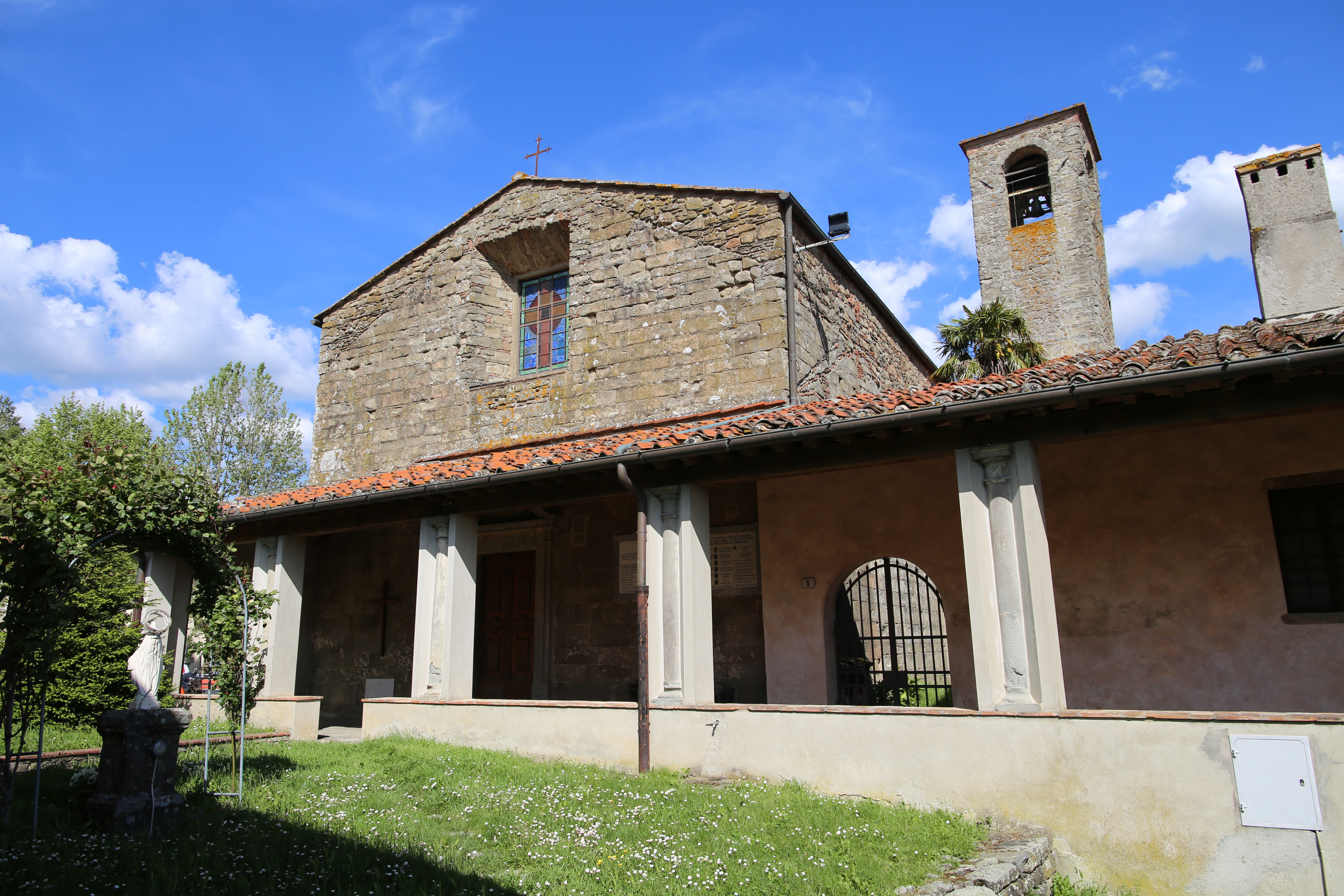
Facade

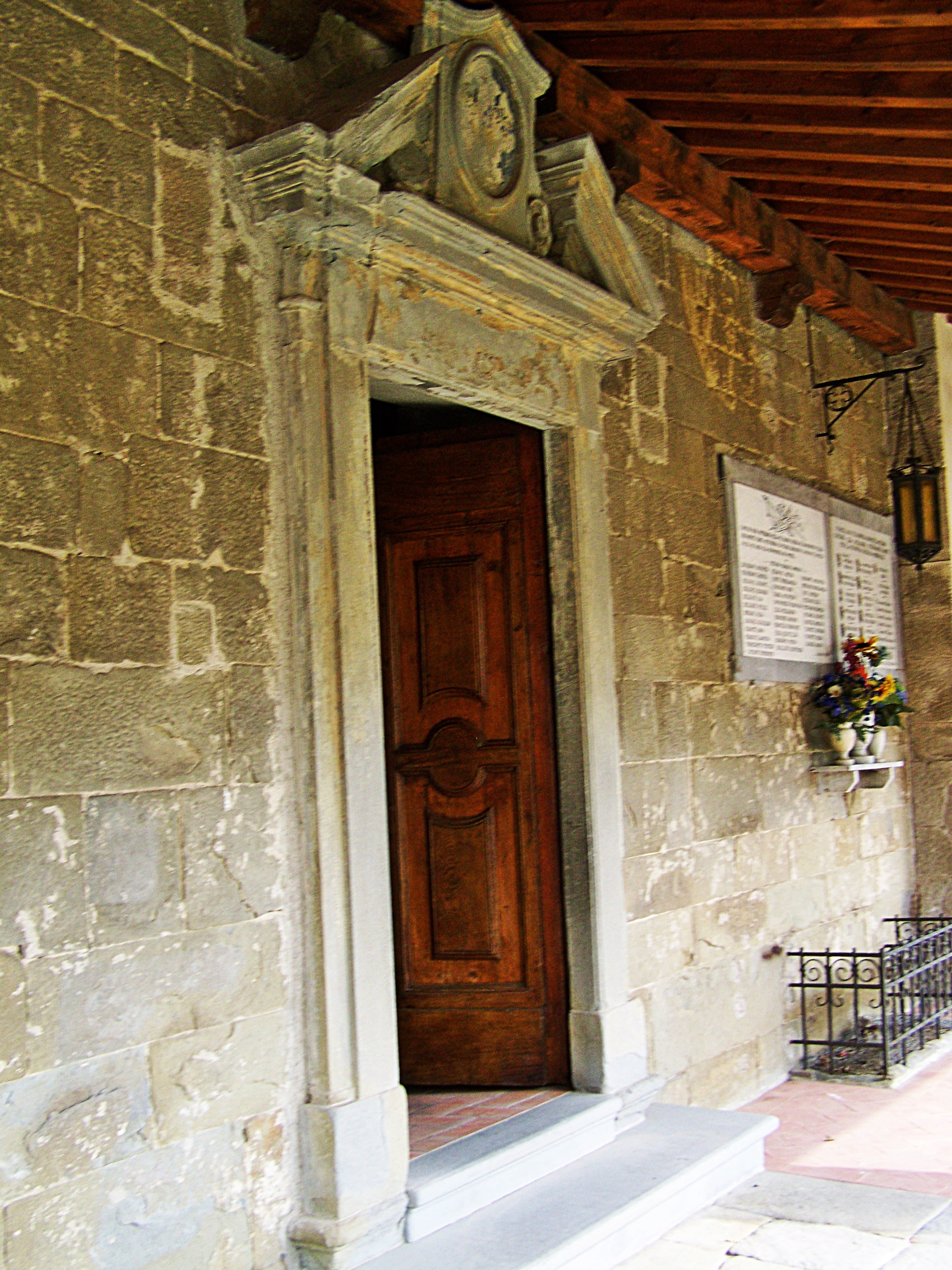
Entrance

Sant’Ippolito e Cassiano is a small medieval parish Roman Catholic church located in Sant’Ippolito of Vernio, near the town of Vernio in the Province of Prato, Tuscany, Italy.

== History ==
A church at the site, also known as the parish church of St. Hippolytus in the Alps (or Visia) was originally constructed in 998. The existing church is a 12th-century reconstruction with minor later additions. It is likely that the church was a renovated building of Lombard (eighth century), as is indicated by the saint to whom the church is dedicated. The small town of Sant’Ippolito of Vernio sprung up around the church.

== Exterior ==
The plain façade facing the main square retains the original 12th-century sandstone, with a later inserted rectangular window, replacing an earlier lancet. The remaining walls are made with irregular stone masonry from the 13th-century. The 17th-century choir connects the campanile or belltower, that holds a 12th-century crypt. The belltower is square with a belfry consisting of four undecorated, single windows.

The church has a single-aisled nave terminating in an apse. On the side walls are mullioned windows. The left side of the church opens on the town square. Along the left wall are the remains of later restorations and modifications: three rectangular windows and a single window characterized by the monolithic structure of a lowered bow. The portico connects the church to the sacristy.

=== Interior ===
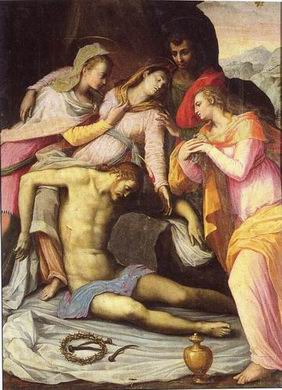
Deposition by Giovanni Bizelli

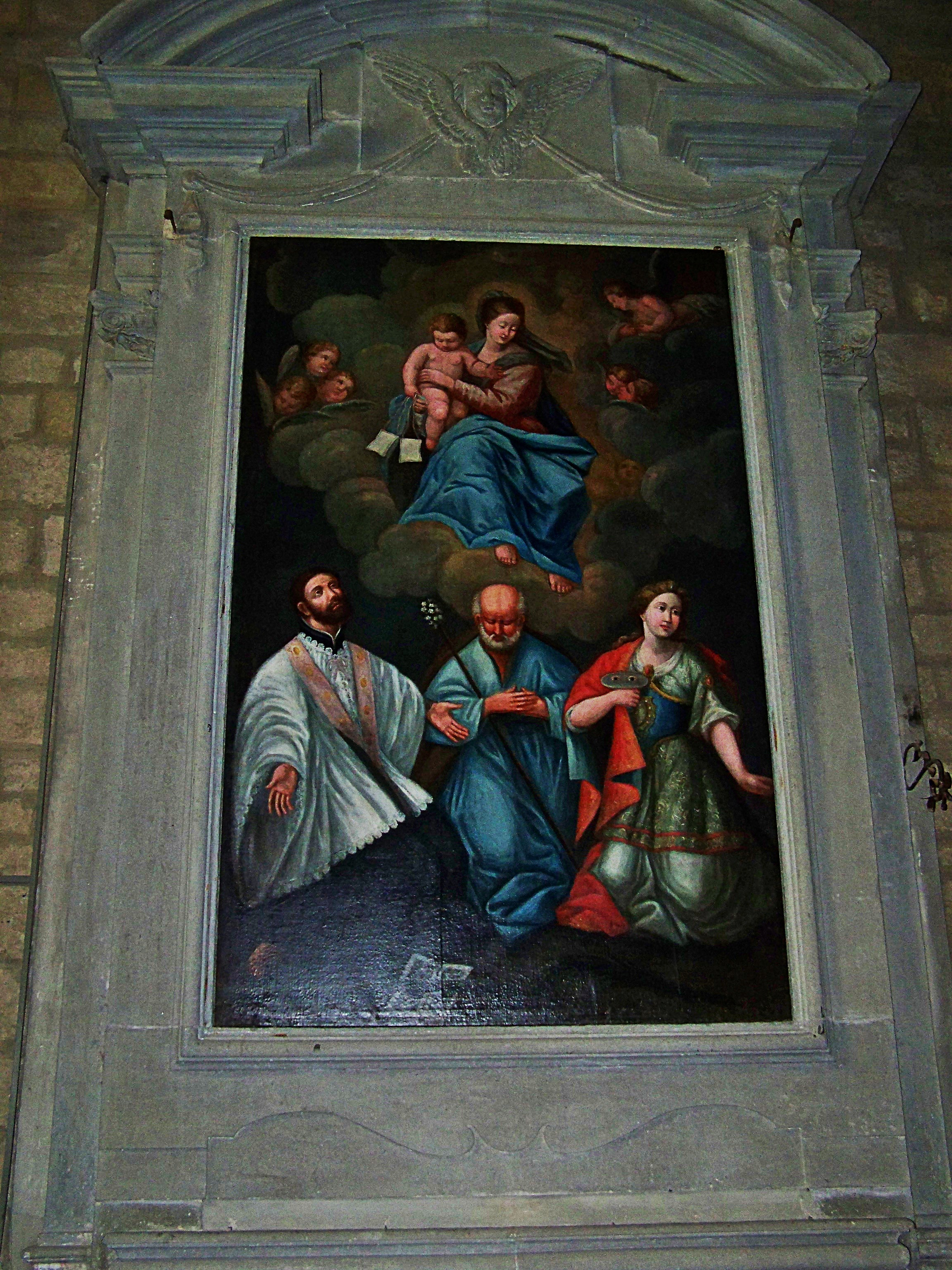
Altarpiece

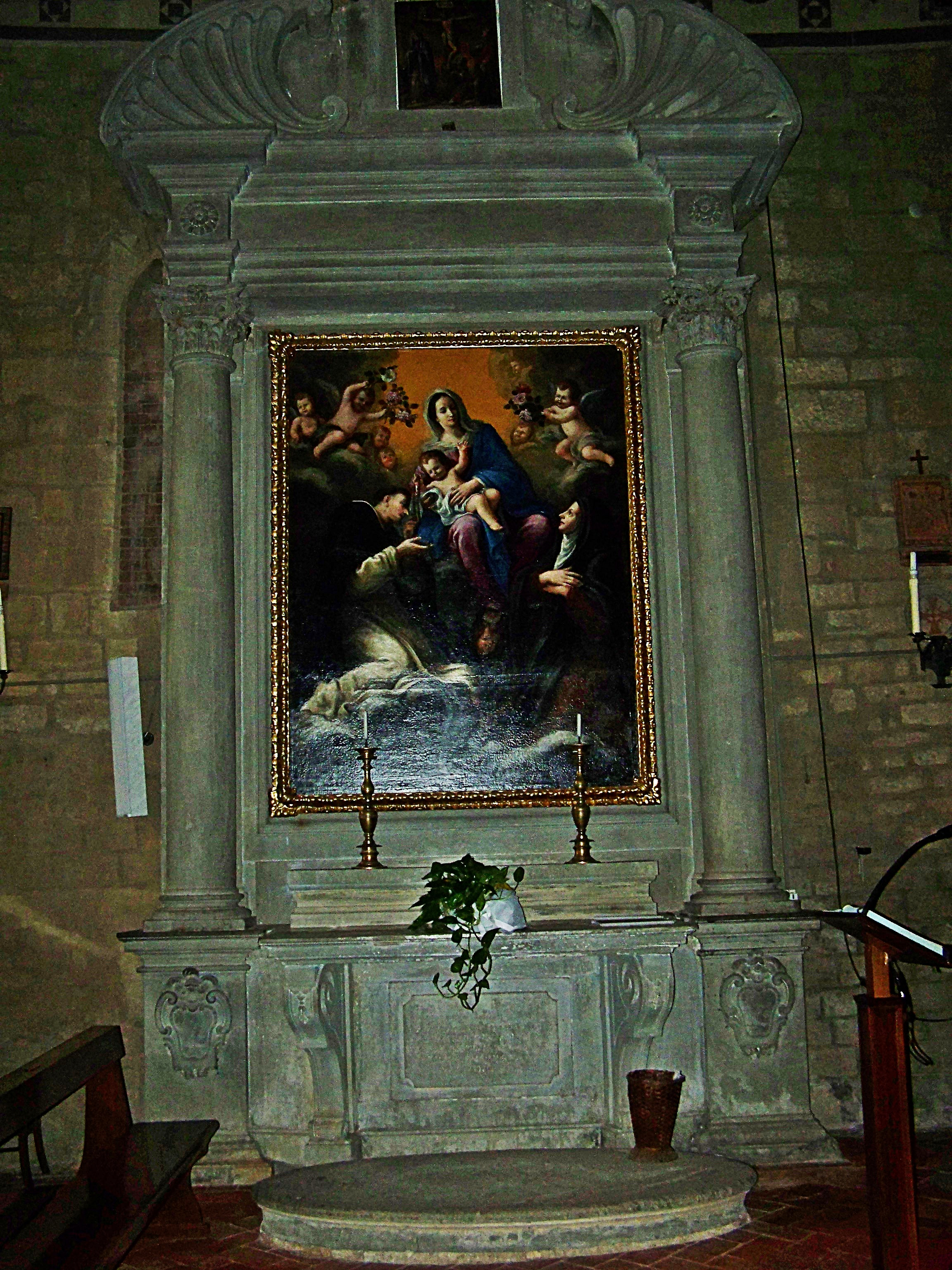
Madonna of the Rosary

The interior is characterized by a single nave covered by wooden trusses. The nave ends in a rectangular apse with a vaulted ceiling. This is surrounded by a round arch that opens on the end wall. The interior was remodeled in the 18th century including the remaking of wooden doors, the addition of confessionals, a high altar and several side altars.

Most of the stone walls are bare. The first altar on the right houses an altarpiece depicting the Deposition of Christ (1579), Giovanni Bizzelli, pupil of Alessandro Allori. The altar to the left has a Madonna of the Rosary (Florentine school of the late 17th century). The sacristy has an altarpiece depicting Adoration of Shepherds (1503, Girolamo Ristori).
