= Cosimo Gamberucci =

Italian painter

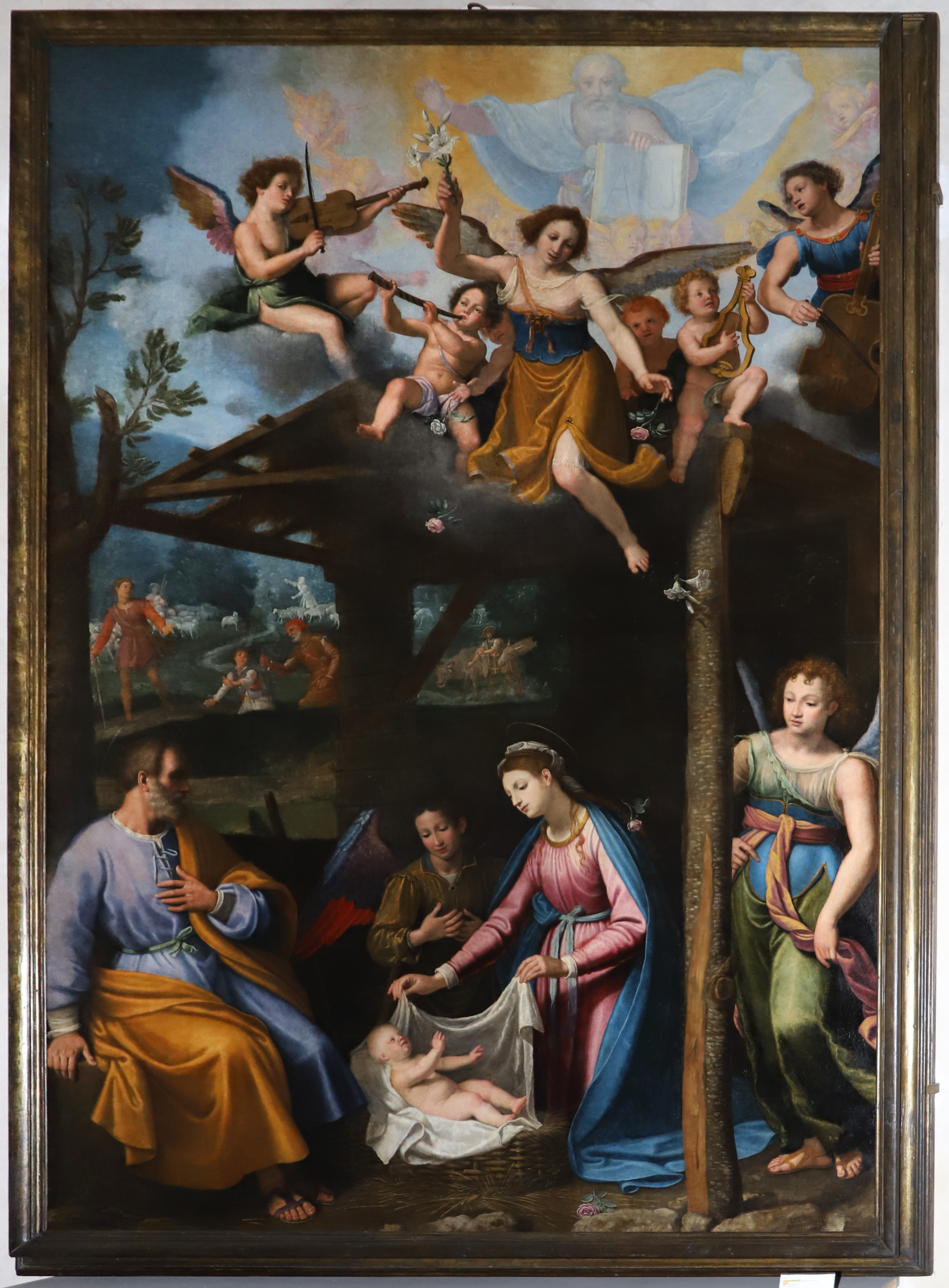
Nativity, in the Santa Maria Maddalena dei Pazzi in Florence

Cosimo Gamberucci (8 January 1562 – 24 December 1621) was a Florentine painter and a scholar of Battista Naldini. He did not attain to great celebrity in the art, although some of his works in the churches at Florence, particularly his picture of St. Peter curing the lame Man, in San Pietro Maggiore, just amount to respectability. He also painted easel pictures, which are found in the collections at Florence.
