= Cosimo Duti =

Italian painter

Cosimo Duti (active 1588 - died 1630) was an Italian painter active in his native Florence. He was a pupil of Battista Naldini. He is also referred to as Cosimo Dati. He is said to have engraved some of the ephemeral decorations erected for the entry to Florence of Christine of Lorraine in 1588. He died in Florence from bubonic plague.
