= Pietro di Miniato =

Italian painter

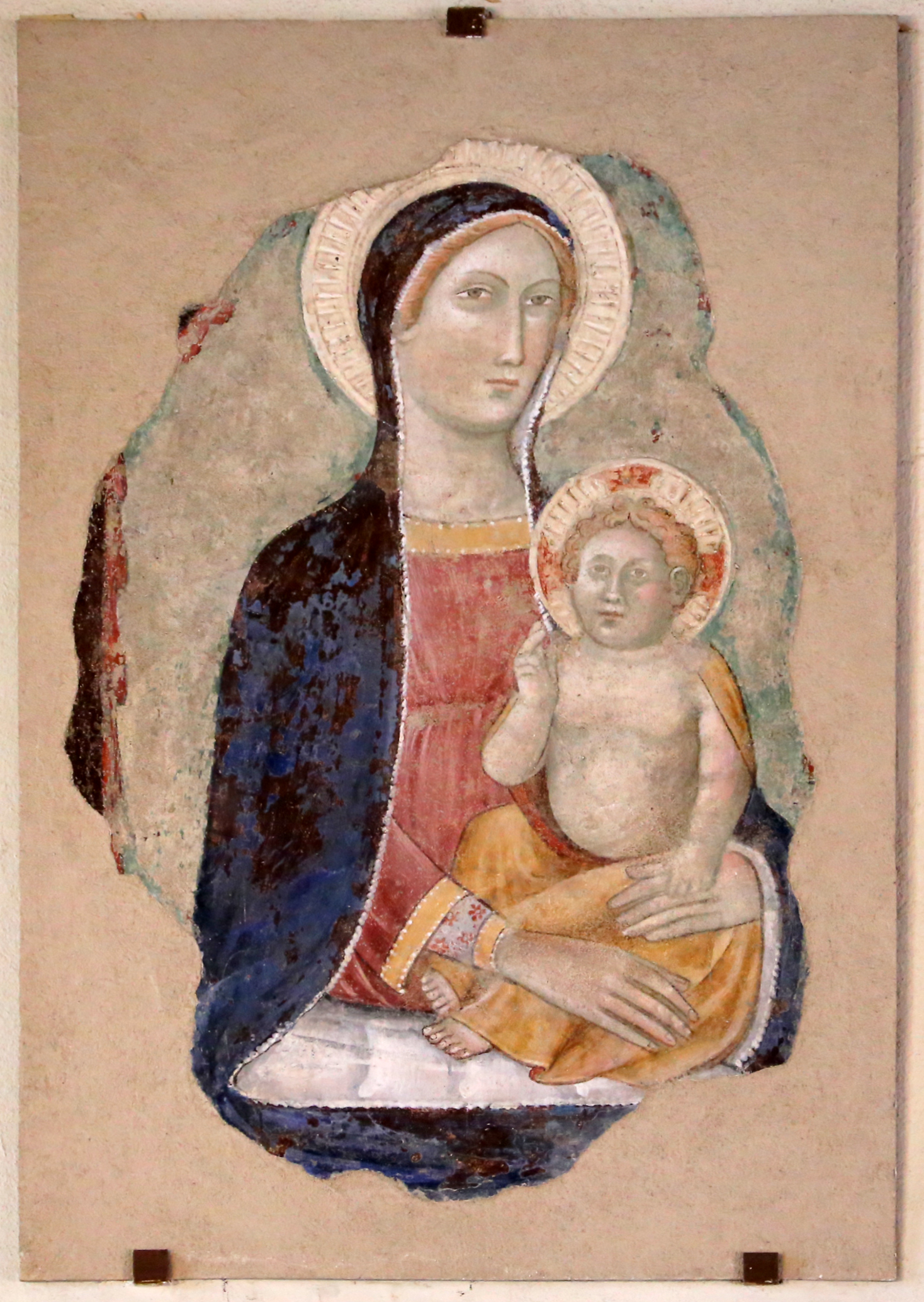
Madonna, ca. 1410, detached fresco from Cappella dei Morti, new Refectory, San Niccolò, Prato

Pietro di Miniato or Pietro di San Miniato (* c. 1366 in Florence – † betw. 1430 and 1446 in Prato) was an Italian painter, active in Florence and Prato, working in the Gothic style of the Florentine School like Niccolò Gerini and Agnolo Gaddi.

He collaborated with a relative, Antonio di Miniato di Piero (* 1387 in Florence – † 1466 in Prato), probably his son, who was active in and around Prato around 1430. There, he belonged to a group of painters, beginning with Bernardo Daddi, Giovanni da Milano, and later local artists, who received commissions from Francesco di Marco Datini, among others, who worked in a Gothic manner up until the Early Renaissance. Their works are represented in the Prato Civic Museum and in San Domenico, the Museum of Mural Painting in Prato..

Works attributed to Pietro di Miniato include a fresco fragment depicting the Martyrdom of St. Sebastian in the Church of Sant'Ambrogio in Florence, dating from around 1390/1395, and in the Prato Civic Museum a polyptych with a double predella, which is very rare (Another case is an altarpiece by Giovanni da Milano in the same museum). Frescos in the Church of San Niccolò in Prato and in the Chapel of St. Stephen in Prato Cathedral depict the Virgin Mary with the Christ Child, flanked by saints.. He is also now credited with an Annunciation scene in Santa Maria Novella, Florence, which had long remained without an author.

In the US two museums have attributed works in their collection to Pietro di Miniato. The Saint Louis Art Museum has a life-size painted Crucifix with the Virgin and Saint John the Baptist and a nun praying at the bottom end. The work was commissioned by a Tuscan convent of Poor Clares, an order of Franciscan nuns, sometime between around 1400 and 1420. The theme is emphasized by the depiction of a pelican that feeds its offspring with its own blood. And the Philadelphia Museum of Art owns a small panel of a Crucifixion in its collection credited to the painter.

== List of attributed works ==
- Crucifix, c. 1400–1420, tempera and gilding on wood, 219.7 × 144.8 cm, Saint Louis Art Museum (107-1932; 33594)
- Crucifixion with the Mourning Virgin and St John the Evangelist, c. 1420, tempera and gilding on wood, 57.5 x 27.3 cm, Philadelphia Museum of Art (Louise and Walter Arensberg Collection, 1950-134-532)

== Gallery ==
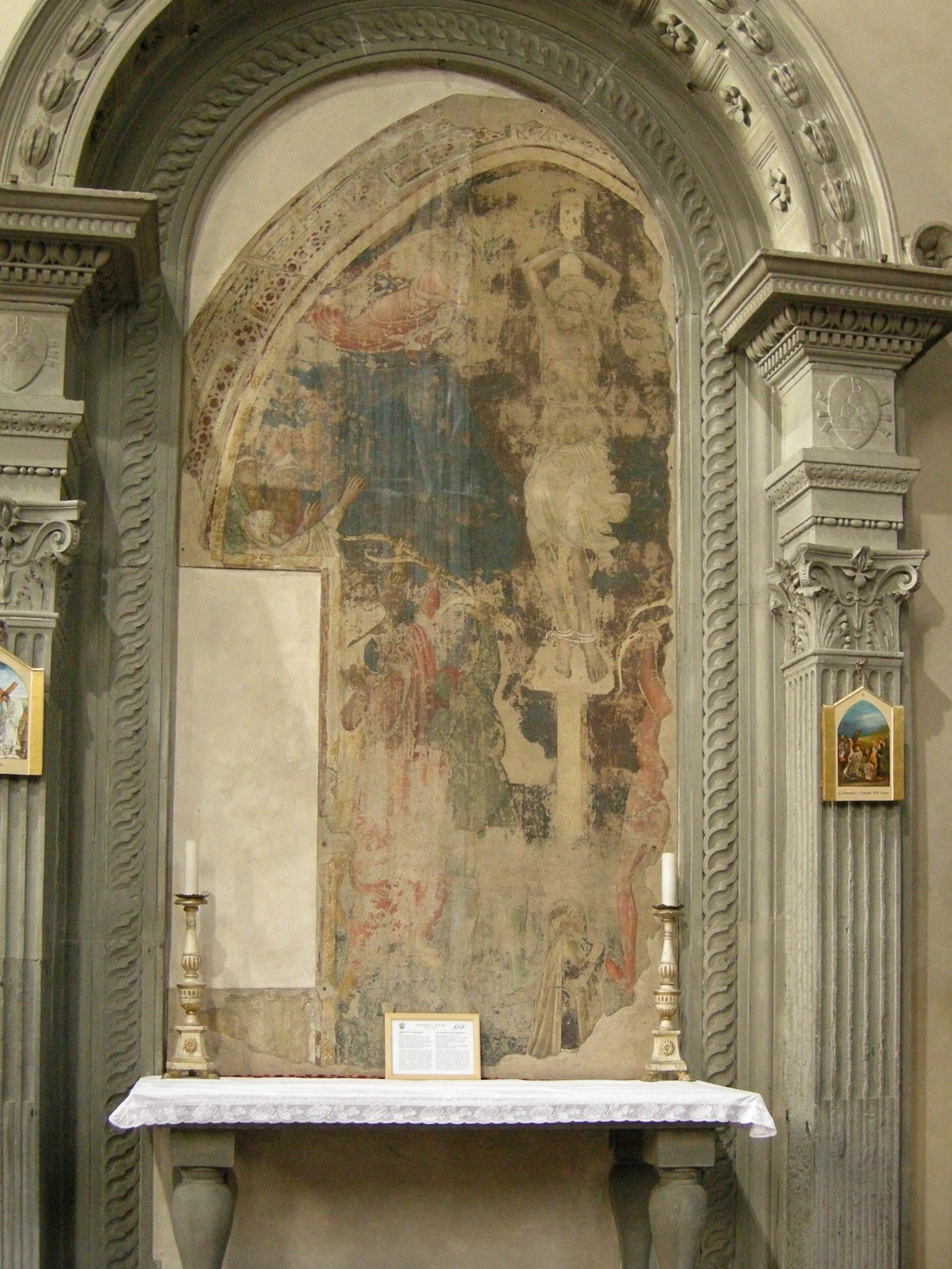
Partially uncovered fresco depicting the Martyrdom of St Sebastian in Sant'Ambrogio, Florence

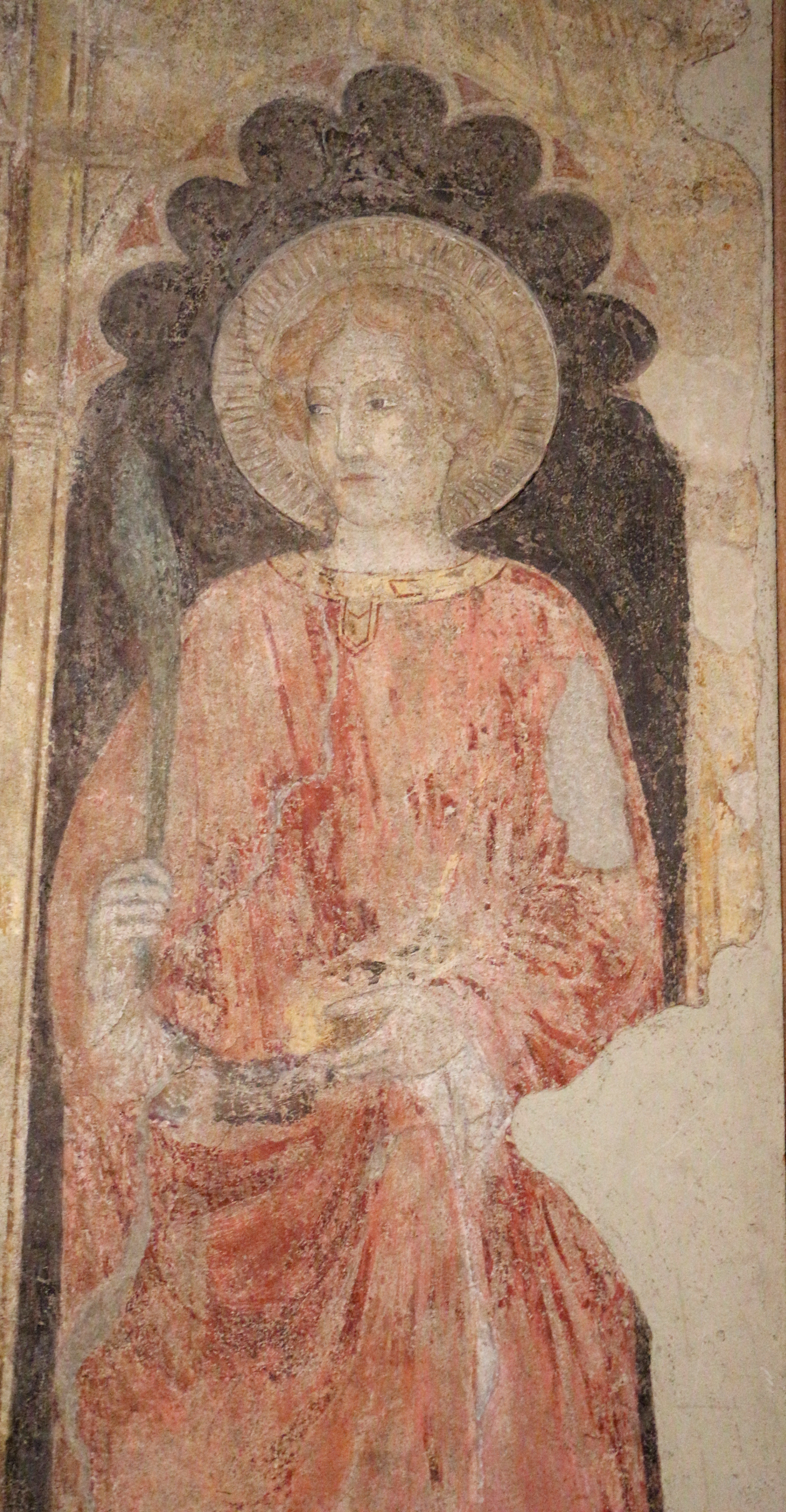
Pietro and Antonio di Miniato, Laurentius of Rome with Martyr's palm aside a Madonna Enthroned, 1411, fresco, Museo di Pittura Murale, Prato

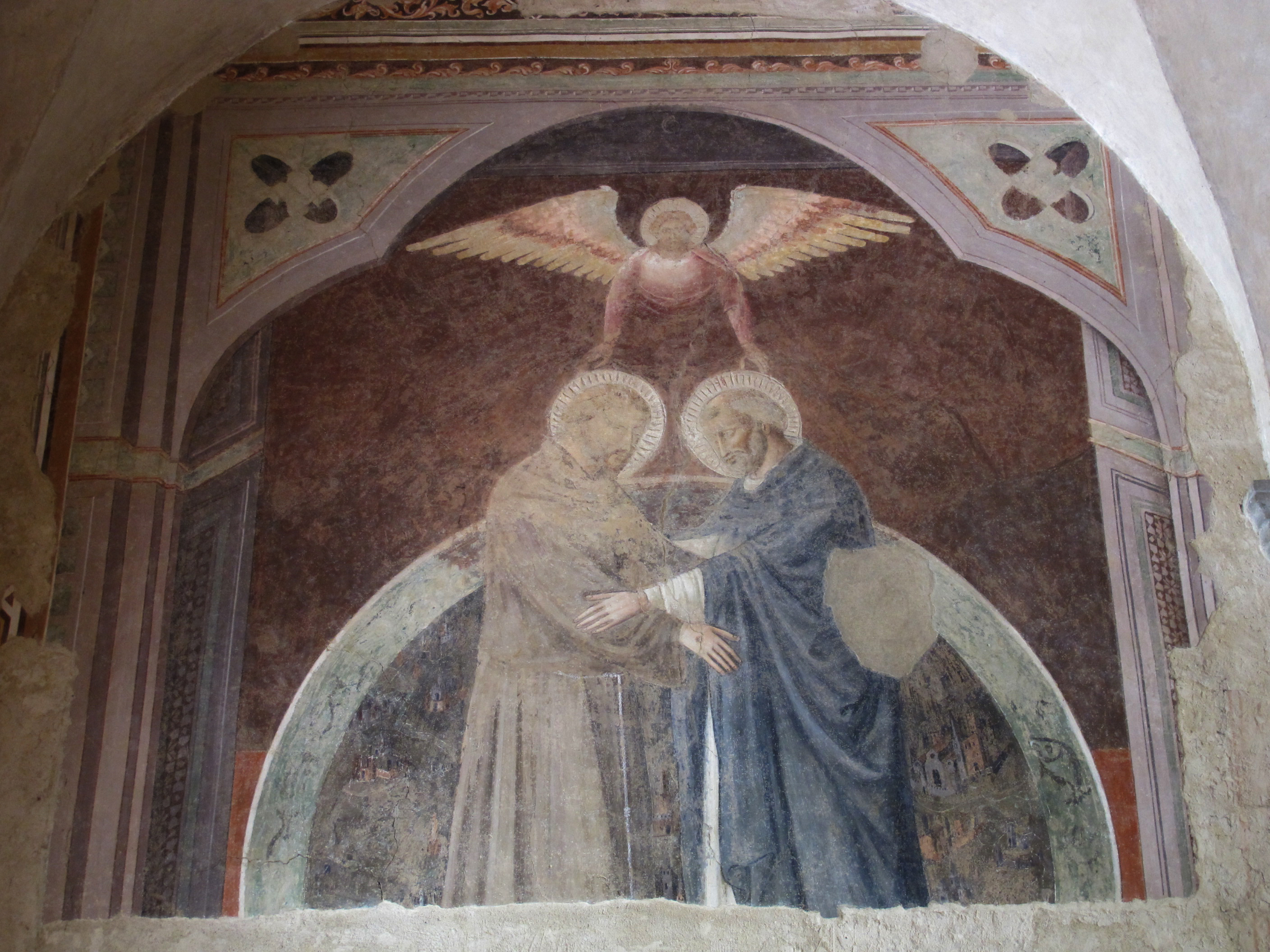
Begegnung der Hl. Dominikus und Franziskus, Chapter house of San Domenico, Prato

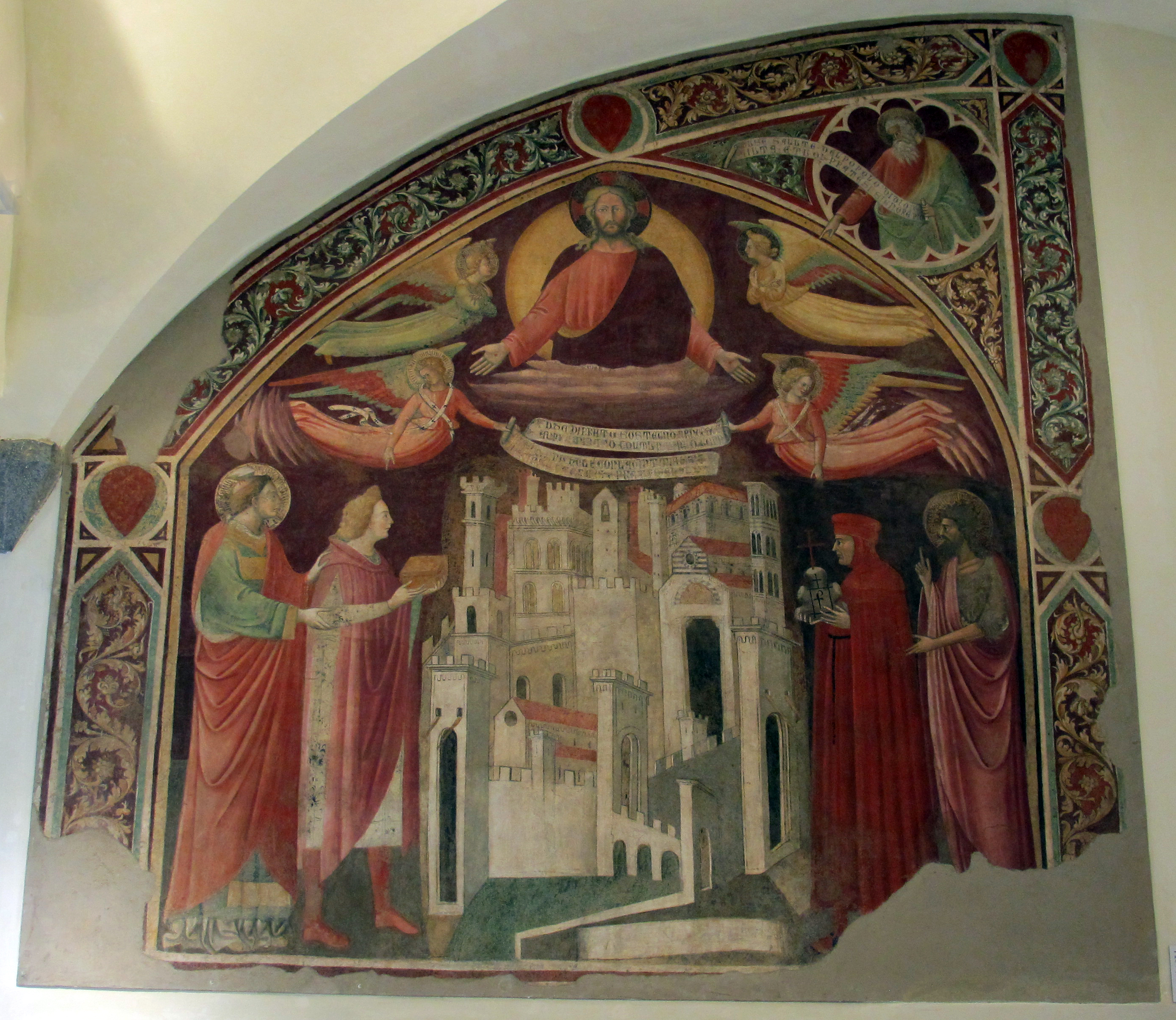
Pietro and Antonio di Miniato, metaphorical Veduta, fresco for Michele and Francesco Datini, 1415, Palazzo Pretorio, Prato

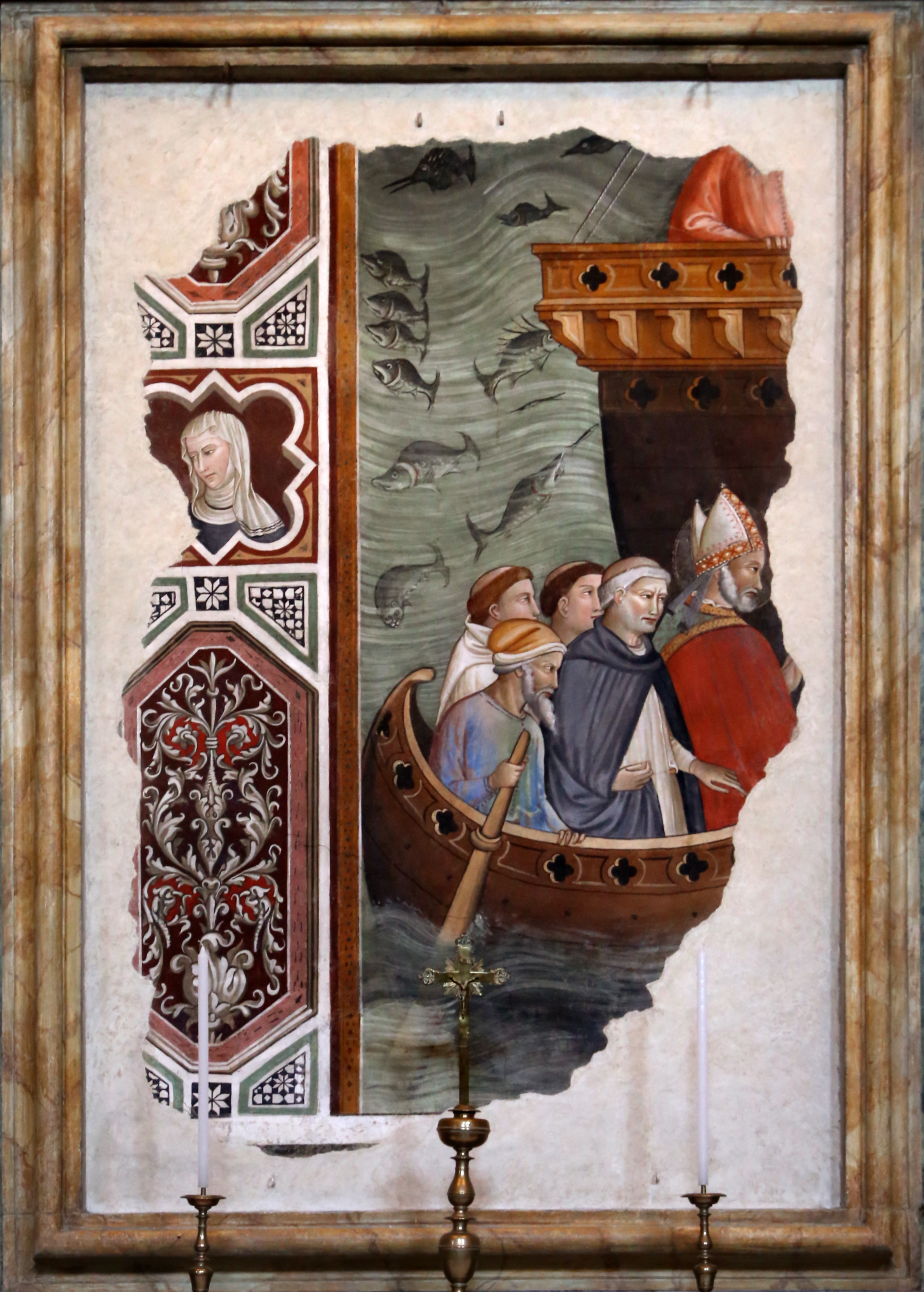
Wonders of St. Nicolas, 1423, San Niccolò, Prato

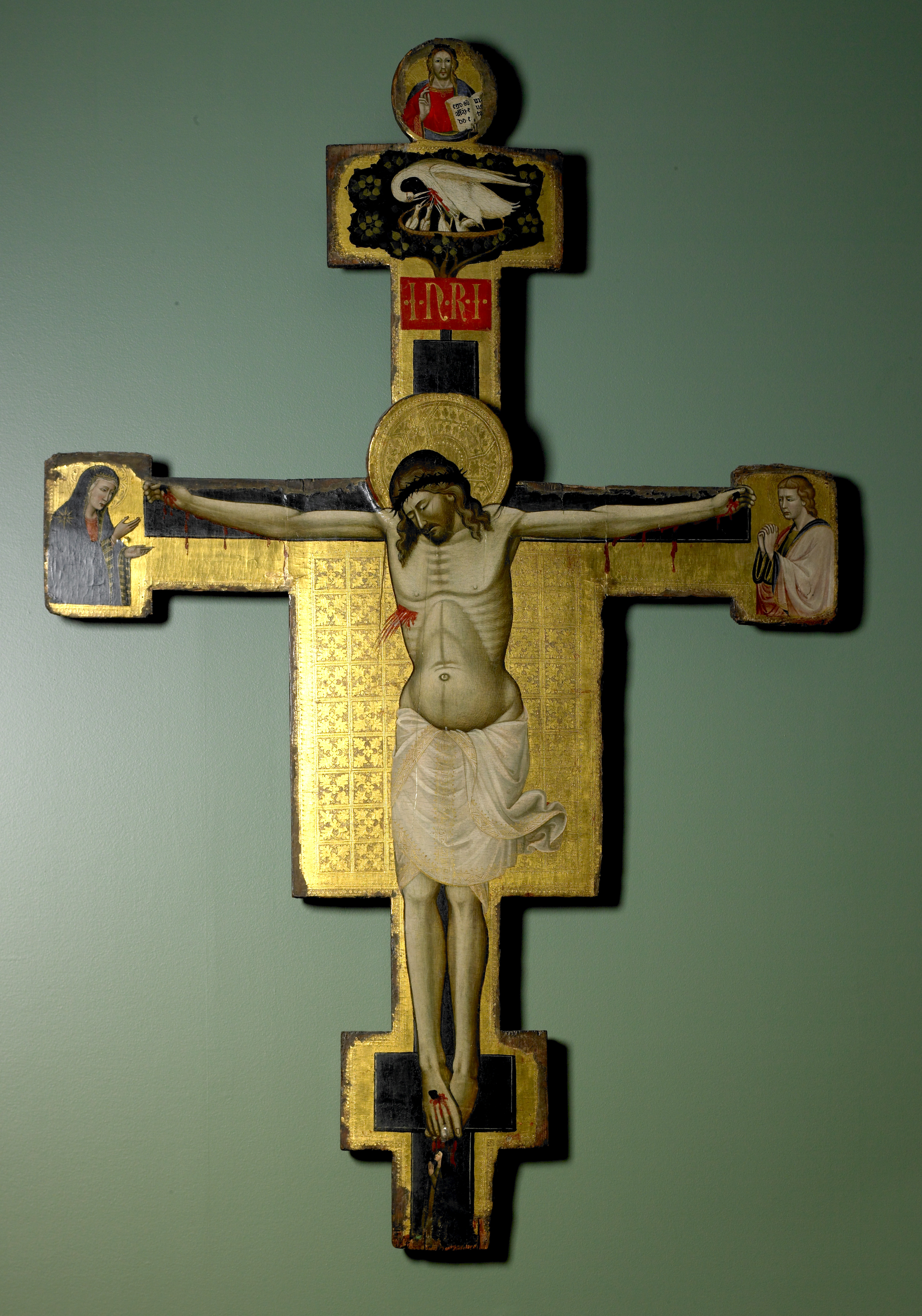
Crucifix, ca. 1400–1420, Saint Louis Art Museum
