= Duti Monor Jonak =

Indian drama series

- Genre: Family, drama, romance
- Screenplay by: Nayan Khaund, Janvi Mazumdar
- Story by: Nayan khaund
- Directed by: Kalpajyoti Das
- Opening theme: "Duti monor jonak" by Torali sharma
- Country of origin: India
- Original language: Assamese
- No. of seasons: 2
- No. of episodes: 180

Production
- Producer: Har Govinda Mahanta
- Camera setup: Single camera
- Running time: approx. 20-21 minutes
- Production company: HGM Films

Original release
- Network: Rang
- Release: 3 February – 29 August 2020

Duti Monor Jonak (The Two Sides Love) was an Assamese romantic drama series that premiered on 3 August 2020 on Rang TV. It was produced by Har Govinda Mahanta under HGM Films, and starred Munmi Phukan, Sukanya Rajguru, Sidharth Kalita, Upasona Priyam, and Komol Lusan.

== Cast ==
=== Season 1 ===
- Munmi Phukon as Kasturi
- Sukanya Rajguru as Nidhi
- Guna Borah as om
- Sidhant Kalita as Aryan
- Joli Laskar as Anjali
- Jyoti Narayan Nath as Tejas
- Manami Bezbaruah as Biswajit Ojah
- Nayan Jyoti Gogoi as Nayan

=== Season 2 ===
- Upasana Priyam as Kasturi
- Komal Lusan as Brikam
