= Dutti =

Dutti may refer to:

- Massimo Dutti, Spanish fabrics and clothing company
- Sunil Dutti (born 1960), Indian politician and a member of Indian National Congress
