= Timeline of Prato =

The following is a timeline of the history of the city of Prato in the Tuscany region of Italy.

== Prior to 20th century ==
- 10th C. - Cathedral of Saint Stephen was already in existence.
- 11th C. - Borgo di Cornio and Santo Stefano pieve (settlements) merged to form "Borgo di Prato."
- 12th C. - Walls of Prato built.
- 1107 - Prato besieged by forces of Matilda of Canossa.
- 1142 - Comunal consul active (approximate date).
- 1180 - Prato "under the Imperial supremacy."
- 1193 - Office of "imperial podesta" formed (approximate date).
- 13th C.
  - Palazzo Pretorio, Prato assembled.
  - Palazzo degli Alberti originates.
- 1211 - Cathedral of San Stefano rebuilding begins.
- 1228 - Franciscan church established.
- 1248 - Castello dell'Imperatore (castle) built.
- 1271 - Sant'Agostino monastery built.
- 1283 - San Domenico church founded.
- 1292 - Ordinamenti sacrati (law) adopted.
- 1295 - San Francesco church built.
- 14th C. - Corporazione dell'Arte della Lana (wool guild) formed.
- 1301 - Black Guelphs in power.
- 1313 - Prato "acknowledged the authority of Robert, King of Naples."
- 1322 - Monastero e chiesa di San Niccolò construction begins.
- 1347 - Black Death plague.
- 1351 - Prato sold to Florentines by Joanna I of Naples.
- 1383 - Palazzo Datini construction begins.
- 1429 - Population: 3,517 (approximate).
- 1499 - Santa Maria delle Carceri church built.
- 1512 - Sack of Prato by Spanish forces.
- 1653
  - Roman Catholic diocese of Pistoia e Prato formed.
  - Prato "obtained the rank of city".
- 1666 - Collegio Cicognini founded.
- 1766 - Biblioteca Roncioniana (library) built.
- 1830 - Teatro Metastasio (theatre) opens.
- 1861 - Population: 32,710.^{(it)}
- 1896 - Statue of Francesco Datini erected in the Piazza del Comune (Prato).

== 20th century ==
- 1906 - Population: 20,197.
- 1908 - A.C. Prato (football club) formed.
- 1932 - Florence-Montecatini highway opens.
- 1934
  - Bologna–Florence railway begins operating.
  - Prato Centrale railway station built.
- 1936 - Population: 64,362.^{(it)}
- 1941 - Stadio Lungobisenzio (stadium) opens.
- 1943 - Bombing of Prato in World War II.
- 1944 - 7 September: Eccidio del Castello dell'Imperatore.
- 1945 - Cooperativa Autotrasporti Pratesi (transit entity) formed.
- 1950 - Sede INAIL (Prato) built.
- 1951 - Population: 77,631.^{(it)}
- 1954 - Roman Catholic Diocese of Prato established.
- 1961 - Population: 111,285.^{(it)}
- 1967 - Prato Cathedral Museum founded.
- 1971 - Population: 143,232.^{(it)}
- 1975 - Prato Textile Museum founded.
- 1977
  - Prato textile museum opens.
  - Teatro Fabbricone (theatre) founded.
- 1978 - Biblioteca comunale Lazzerini (library) established.
- 1988 - Centro per l'arte contemporanea Luigi Pecci opens.
- 1992 - Prato becomes seat of the newly formed Province of Prato.
- 1998 - Cantieri culturali ex Macelli-Officina Giovani built.

== 21st century ==
- 2001 - Monash University, Prato Centre opened.
- 2009 - Roberto Cenni becomes mayor.
- 2013 - Population: 187,159.
- 2014 - Matteo Biffoni becomes mayor.
- 2015 - 31 May: Tuscan regional election, 2015 held.

== See also ==
- History of Prato
- List of mayors of Prato
- List of bishops of Prato, 1653–present (in Italian)
- History of Tuscany
- State Archives of Prato

Other cities in the macroregion of Central Italy:^{(it)}

- Timeline of Ancona, Marche region
- Timeline of Arezzo, Tuscany region
- Timeline of Florence, Tuscany
- Timeline of Grosseto, Tuscany
- Timeline of Livorno, Tuscany
- Timeline of Lucca, Tuscany
- Timeline of Perugia, Umbria region
- Timeline of Pisa, Tuscany
- Timeline of Pistoia, Tuscany
- Timeline of Rome, Lazio region
- Timeline of Siena, Tuscany

== Bibliography ==
=== in English ===
- "Prato" . Encyclopædia Britannica. Vol. 22 (11th ed.). 1910. p. 255.
- Roy Domenico (2002). "Tuscany: Prato". Regions of Italy: a Reference Guide to History and Culture. Greenwood. pp. 339+. ISBN 0313307334.
- Joseph P. Byrne (2004). "Prato". In Christopher Kleinhenz (ed.). Medieval Italy: an Encyclopedia. Routledge. pp. 928+. ISBN 0415939291.

=== in Italian ===
- "Prato", Nuova Enciclopedia Italiana (in Italian), vol. 18 (6th ed.), Unione tipografico-editrice torinese, 1885, hdl:2027/chi.100213905
- Carlo Lozzi (1887). "Storie de'Municipii: Prato". Biblioteca istorica della antica e nuova Italia (in Italian). Vol. 2. Imola. OCLC 12117233. (bibliography)
- E. Corradini (1905). Prato. Bergamo.
- S. Nicastro. Sulla storia di Prato dalle origini alla metà del sec. XIX, Prato 1916
- "Prato", Enciclopedia Italiana (Treccani) (in Italian), 1935
- Ferdinando Carlesi. Origini della città e del Comune di Prato, Arnaldo Forni Editore, 1984.
- Claudio Cerretelli (1996). Prato e la sua provincia. Florence: Giunti Editore. ISBN 88-09-03425-2.
- Percorsi sulla memoria. Le trasformazioni del territorio pratese, Giunti Editore, 1998.
- Franco Cardini. Breve storia di Prato, Pacini Editore, 2006.
- Giuseppe Testa. Prato, la storia e i suoi due distretti, Pentalinea, 2009.
