= Biblioteca Lazzerini =

Coordinates: 43.876432°N 11.098683°E

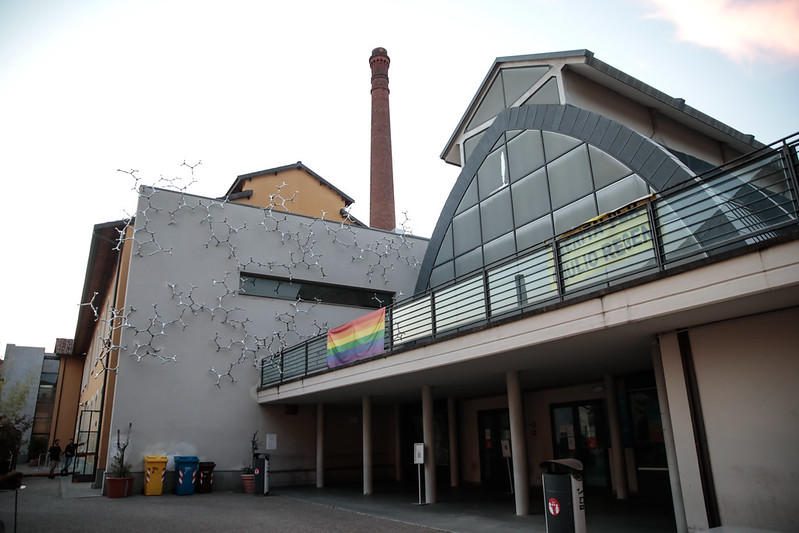
Entrance facade to library

The Biblioteca Lazzarini is the main public library, also called the Lazzerini Cultural and Documentation Institute, which was inaugurated on 24 November 2009. It is located on Via Puccetti #3 in the Santa Chiara district of Prato, region of Tuscany, Italy. The site also houses the Prato Textile Museum (Museo del Tessuto).

The modern library and reading rooms were built in the building that once formed the Campolmi Factory, a 19th-century textile mill. The designs to make the present library and museum were by Marco Mattei.

The first collections (8000 volumes, mainly ecclesiastical) for a town library were donated by the monsignor Alessandro Lazzerini (1766–1836). This collection was initially held in the Biblioteca Roncioniana, however the construction of a communal library was delayed until 1978, when the first site at via del Ceppo Vecchio 7 were opened. This library was not inaugurated until 24 November 2009.
