= Palazzo Pretorio, Prato =

Palazzo Pretorio
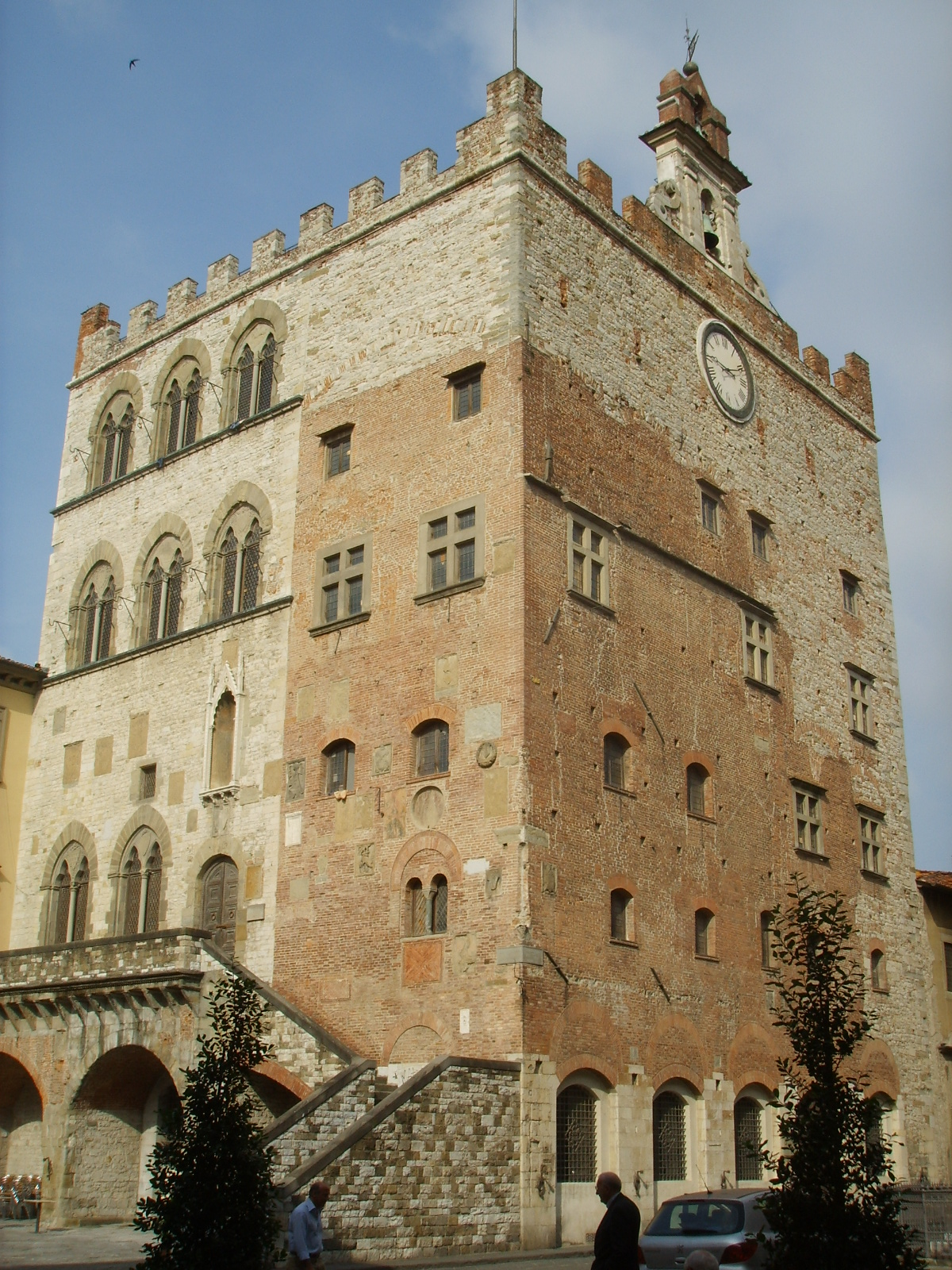
- Facade of the Palace
- Interactive map of the Palazzo Pretorio area

General information
- Type: Medieval Town Hall
- Architectural style: Medieval architecture
- Location: Prato, piazza del Comune
- Coordinates: 43°52′49.92″N 11°5′47.49″E
- Construction started: 12th century
- Completed: 14th century
- Opened: reopened in 2013 as Museum
- Owner: Municipality of Prato

The Palazzo Pretorio is a historical building in Prato, Tuscany, Italy. It was the old city hall, standing in front of the current Palazzo Comunale. It now accommodates the Civic Museum of Prato, which was reopened in September 2013.

== History ==
The main structure in its present form was assembled during the late 13th century and early 14th century from the merger of three separate buildings, fused to house the local podestà, the judiciary and Prison. The different building materials, evident from the facade, still reveal the outlines of the earlier structures. The oldest part is the tower-house still discernible on the right (13th century), which had belonged to the family of Pipini, with a portico on the ground floor with pilasters of limestone then buffered but still visible. It was purchased in 1284 from the capitano del popolo Fresco Frescobaldi to house the municipal government. During the 16th century, the building, including the belltower, collapsed. The restoration added a new bell tower and crowning crenellations. The interiors were often divided into smaller rooms over time. Towards the end of 19th century, it was proposed for demolition, but by 1909 it was decided to restore the building.

The left hand part of the facade and building dates back to the 14th century and has eight elegant mullioned windows and a tabernacle. In this tabernacle, until at least 1799, stood a statue of the 14th century Robert of Anjou, once viewed as a defender of the city. Unfortunately, it was he, who sold Prato to Florence, ending the town's independence. From the portal on the ground floor one enters a series of rooms with original frescoes: the earliest frescoes (1307) by Bettino Corsino and later frescoes (1425) by Pietro di Miniato and Antonio di Miniato. The wide outdoor staircase leads to the main floor.

The Grand Duke Peter Leopold of Lorraine in 1788 expressed the intention of creating a school of design in Prato. By 1858, a collection of works in Prato were being assembled in a civic museum, housed in the nearby Palazzo Comunale. From 1912, the Palazzo Pretorio has hosted the Museo Civico, which contains many works of art ranging from medieval times to the 19th century.

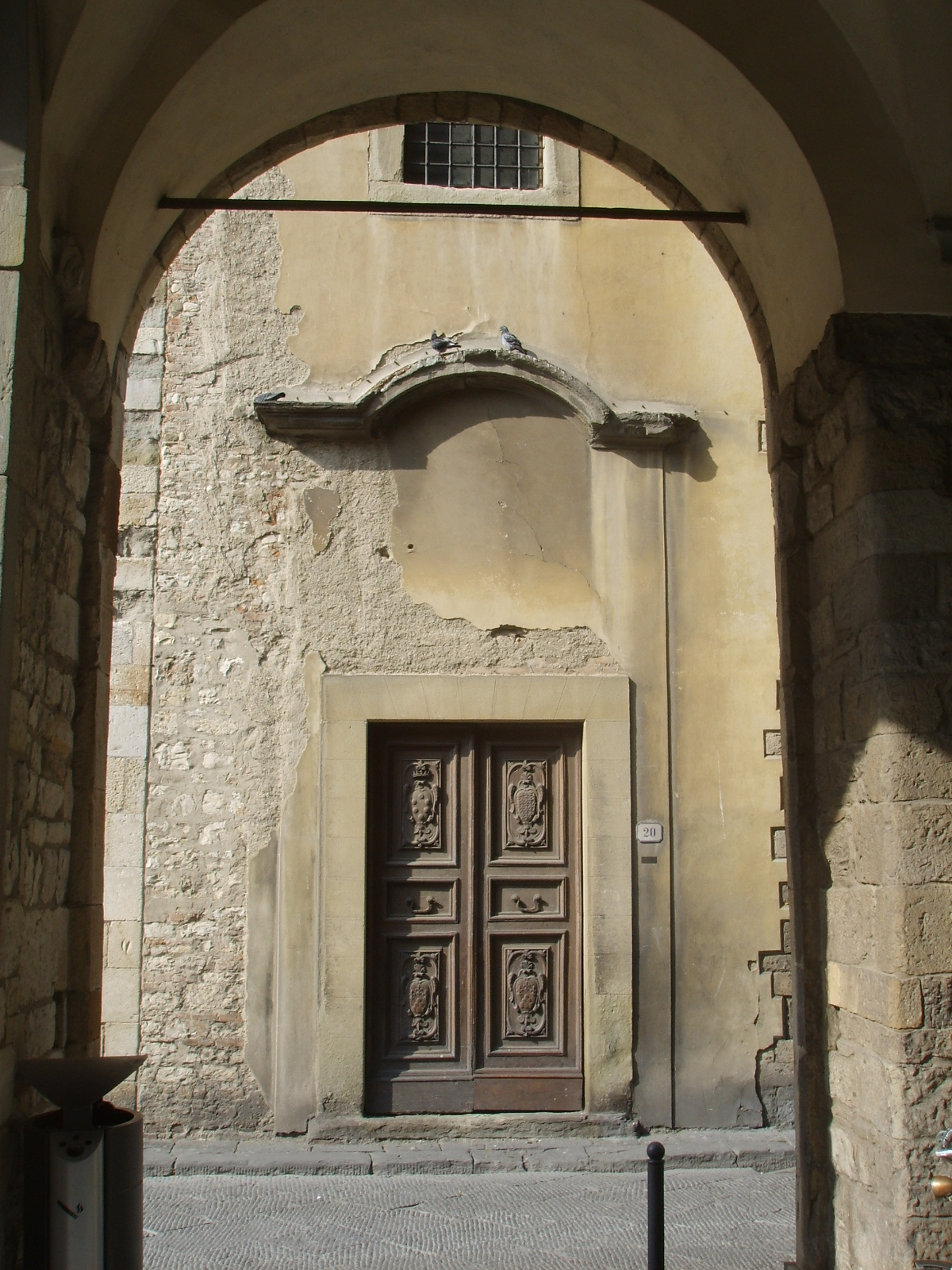
Lateral Entrance

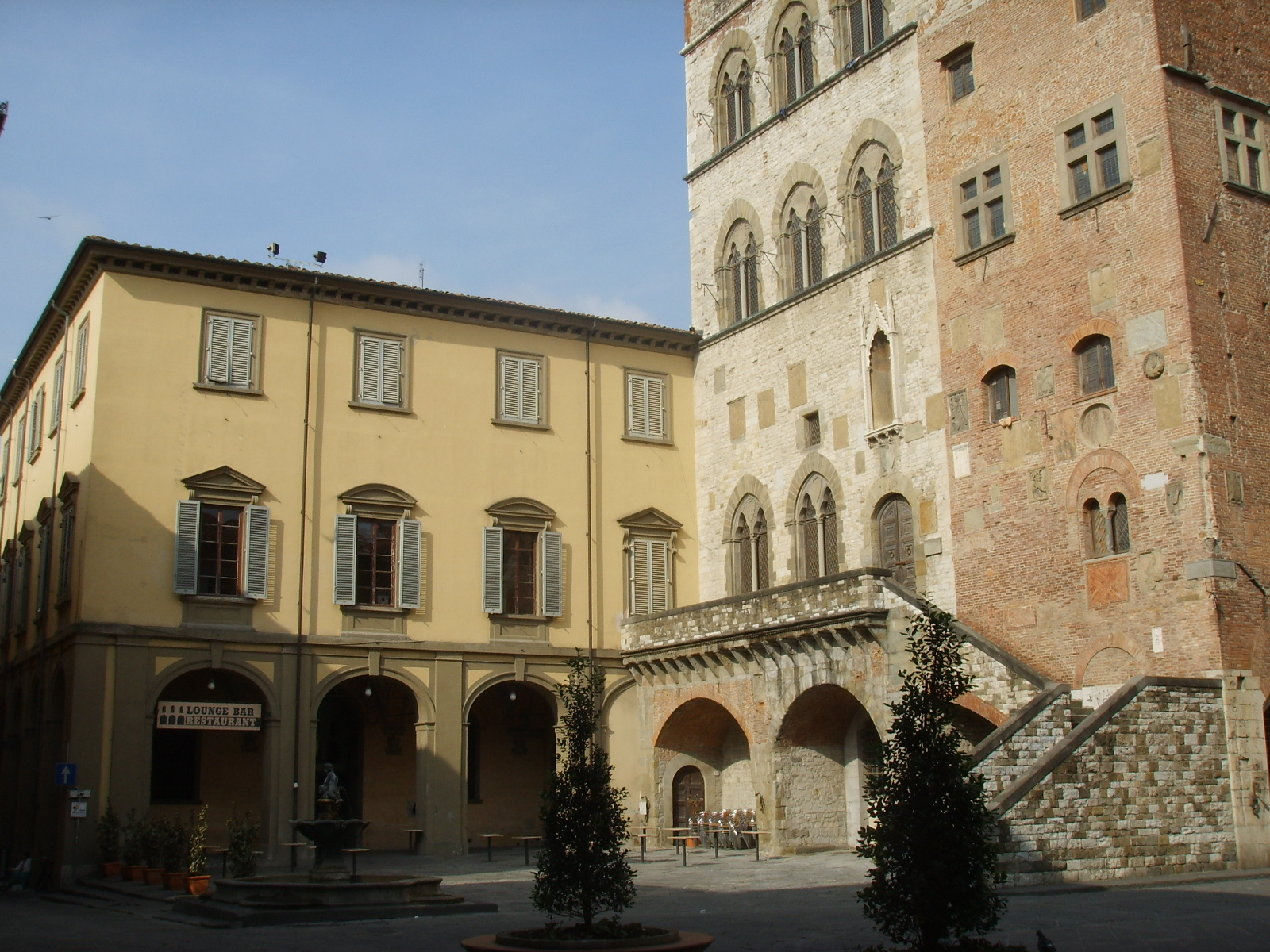
The Museum of Palazzo Pretorio and Piazza del Comune

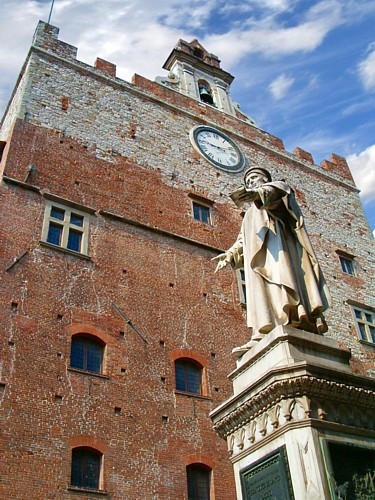
The statue of Datini in front of Palazzo Pretorio

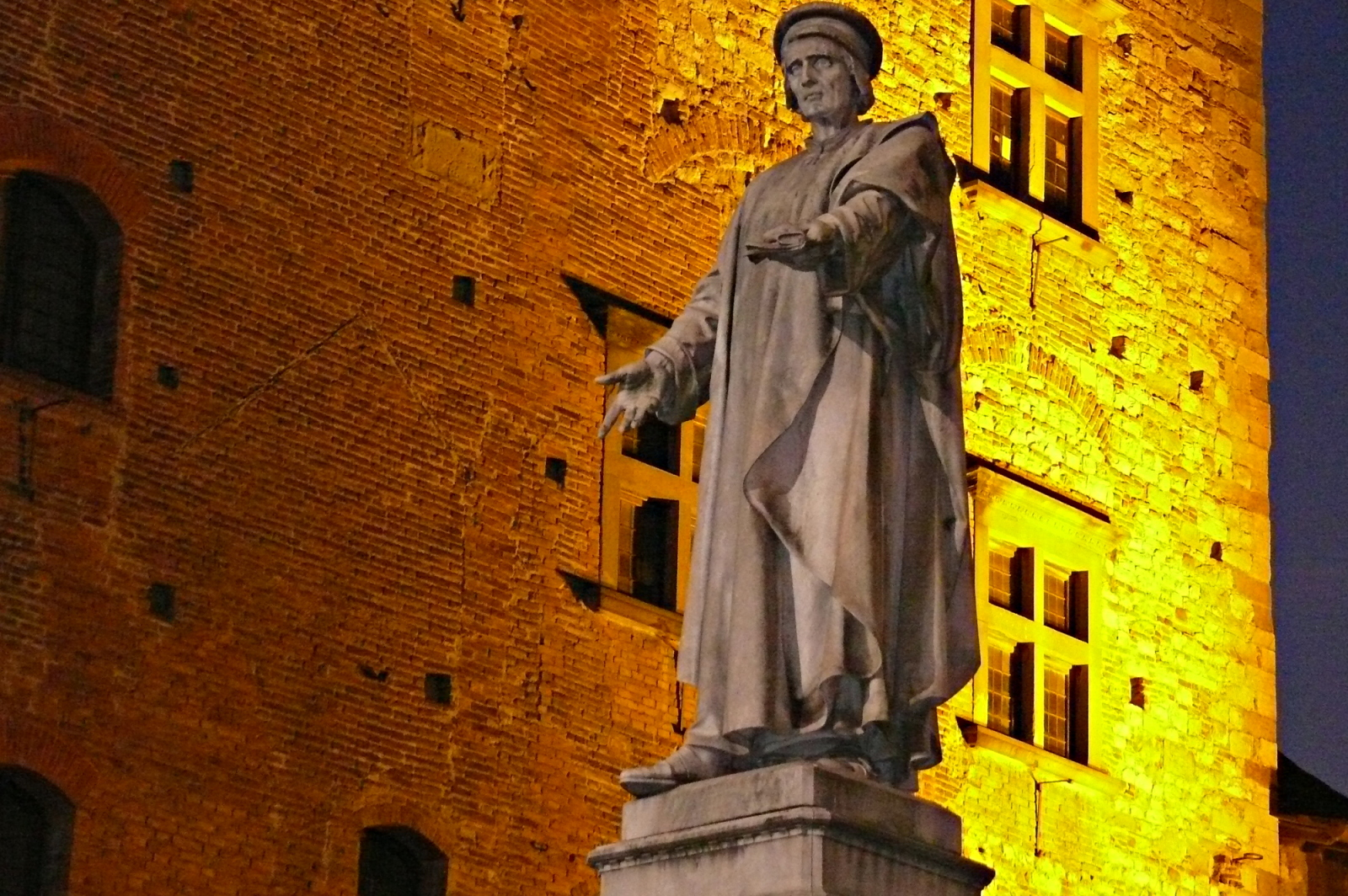
Palazzo Pretorio with statue of Marco Datini

== Main Artworks of the Museo Civico ==
=== Filippo and Filippino Lippi and their time ===
- Blessed Jacopone da Todi, 1435 circa, fresco, 181 × 59 cm by Paolo Uccello
- Madonna del Ceppo, 1452–1453, tempera on panel, 187 x 120 cm by Filippo Lippi
- Madonna of the Girdle, 1456–1460, tempera on panel, 207 x 200 cm by Filippo Lippi
- Adorazione del Bambino di San Vincenzo Ferrer, 1455-1466 circa, tempera on panel, 146,5 x 156,5 cm by Fillipo Lippi
- Madonna col Bambino tra i Santi Stefano e Caterina, Antonio Abate e Margherita , dated 1498, fresco, cm 239 x 141x 71 by Filippino Lippi
- Crucifixion, 1501 ca, tempera on panel, 31,2 x 23,4 cm by Filippino Lippi
- Madonna and Child, St. Stephen and St. John the Baptist, 1502–1503, tempera on panel, 132 x 118 cm by Filippino Lippi
- Madonna of the Girdle, tempera on panel, 207 x 200 cm by Filippo Lippi and Fra Diamante
- Annunciation with St Giuliano, 1455 circa, tempera on panel, 75 x 48 cm by Filippo Lippi and Fra Diamante
- Nativity with Saints George and Vincent Ferrer, tempera on panel, 159 x 168 cm by Studio of Filippo Lipi
- Presentation at the Temple, Adoration by the Magi, Massacre of the Infants, tempera on panel, 26 x 160 cm by Fra' Diamante
- Enthroned Madonna with Child among Saints Jerome, Francis, Anthony of Padua and Ludwig of Toulouse, 1483 ca., tempera on panela, 157 x 133 cm by Francesco Botticini
- Madonna and Child with young St John the Baptist, tempera on panel, 113,5 cm diam. by Raffaellino del Garbo
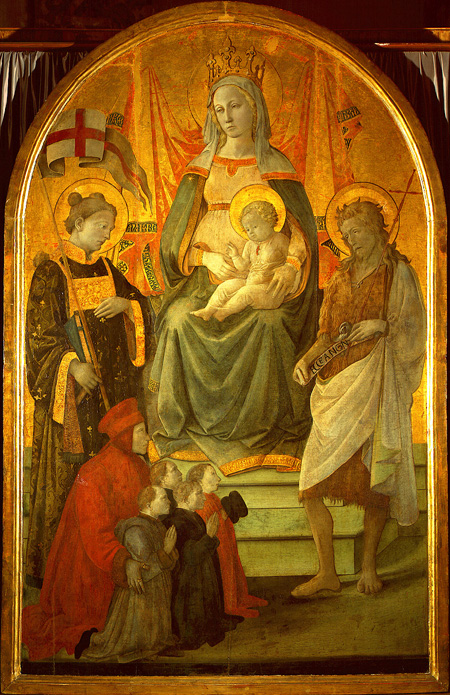
Filippo Lippi, Madonna del Ceppo

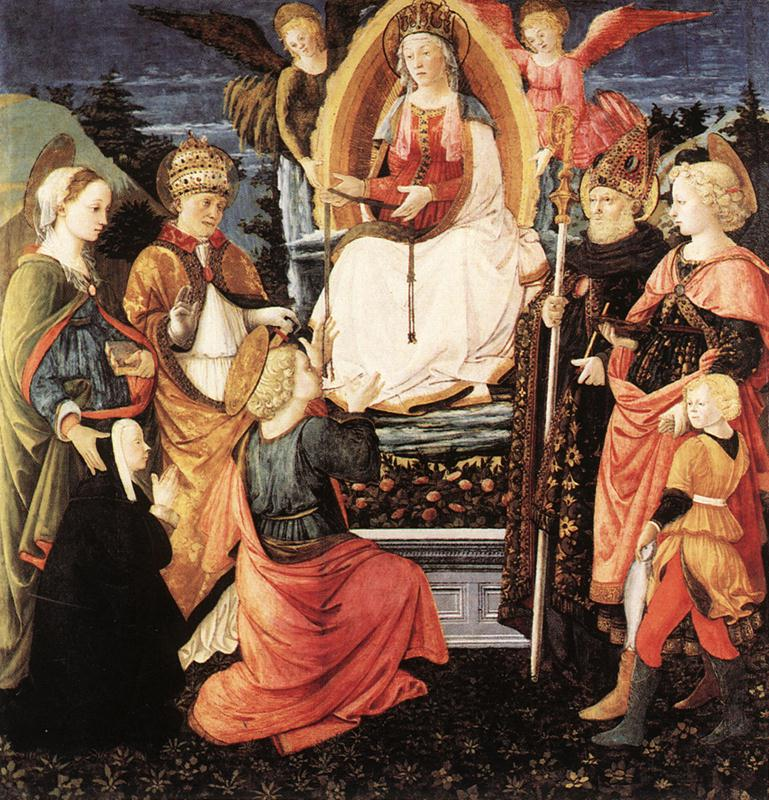
Filippo Lippi, Madonna della Cintola

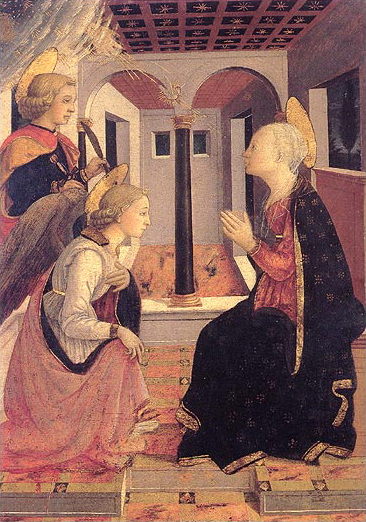
Filippo Lippi, Annunciation with St Giuliano

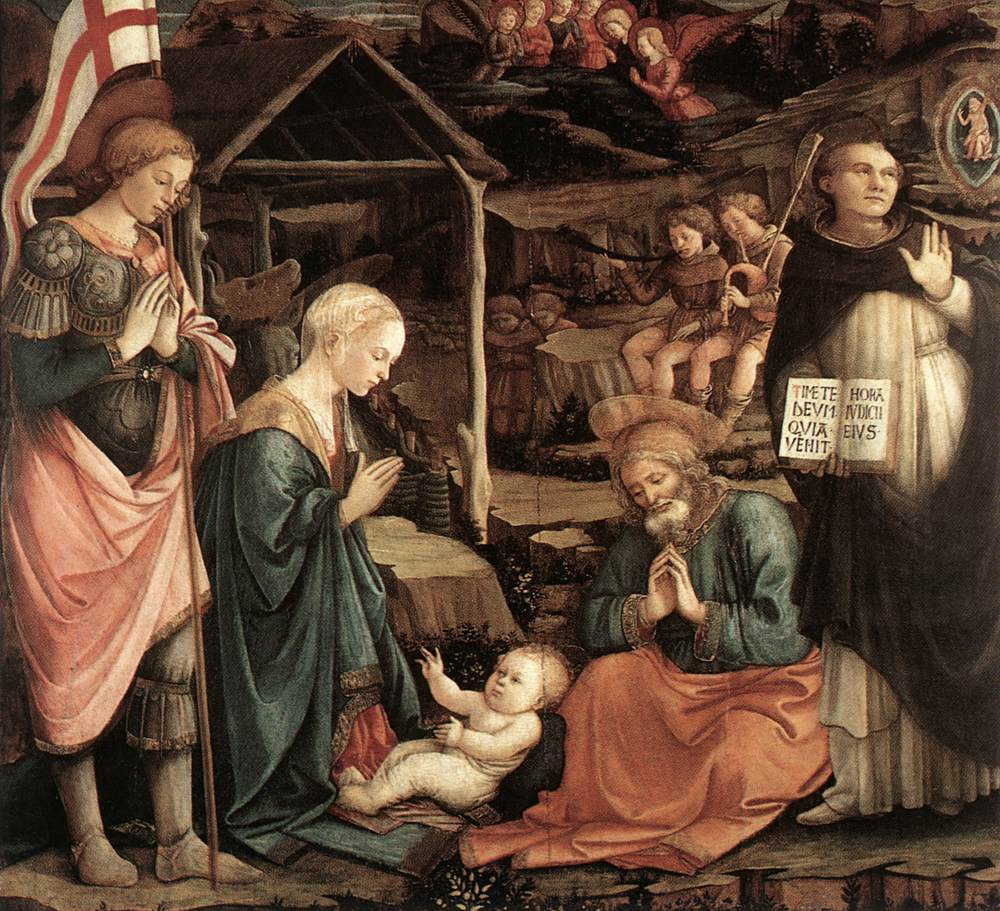
Filippo Lippi, Adoration of Child with St Vincent Ferrer

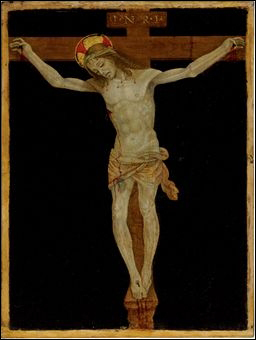
Crucifixion

=== Polyptychs ===
- Madonna and Child between Saints Francis, Bartholomew, Barnabas & Catherine, 1332-1335, tempera on panel by Bernardo Daddi
- Stories of the Holy Girdle, 1337-1338, tempera on panel by Daddi
- Madonna and Child between Saints Catherine of Alexandria, Bernard, Bartholomew & Barnabas, tempera on panel, 245 x 210 cm by Giovanni da Milano
- Stories of the Holy Girdle, tempera on panel, 26,5 x 22,3 cm (each) by Giovanni da Milano
- Coronation of the Virgin with Sts Matthew and Mattias, (doc. 1413), tempera on panel, 139 x 66,5 (central part); 35 x 118 cm (upper predella); 28 x 201 (bottom predella) by Pietro di Miniato
- Enthroned Madonna and Child in trono e due angeli oranti fra i Santi Caterina d'Alessandria, Benedetto, Giovanni Gualberto e Agata, [1413], tempera on panel, 111 x 69 cm (central); 139 x 63 cm (each lateral) by the studio of Lorenzo Monaco
- Madonna and Child with two Angels, tempera on panel, 237 x 250 cm by Andrea di Giusto Manzini

=== Sculptures ===
- Saint Anthony Abbot between two angels, glazed terracotta, 103 x 186,5 cm by Andrea della Robbia
- Madonna and Child, Holy Spirit and two cherubs, glazed terracotta, 82,5 x 55 cm by Benedetto Buglioni
- Leopoldo II Grand Duke of Tuscany, marble, 59 cm (altezza) by Lorenzo Bartolini
- Napoleon Bonaparte, marble, 30 cm (altezza) by Bartolini
- Model of the funeral monument to Nicola Demidoff, alabaster and white marble, 73,5 x 51 x 51 cm by Bartolini
- Fiducia in Dio (Trust in God), plaster, 93 cm (altezza) by Bartolini
