= Niccolò di Pietro Gerini =

Italian painter

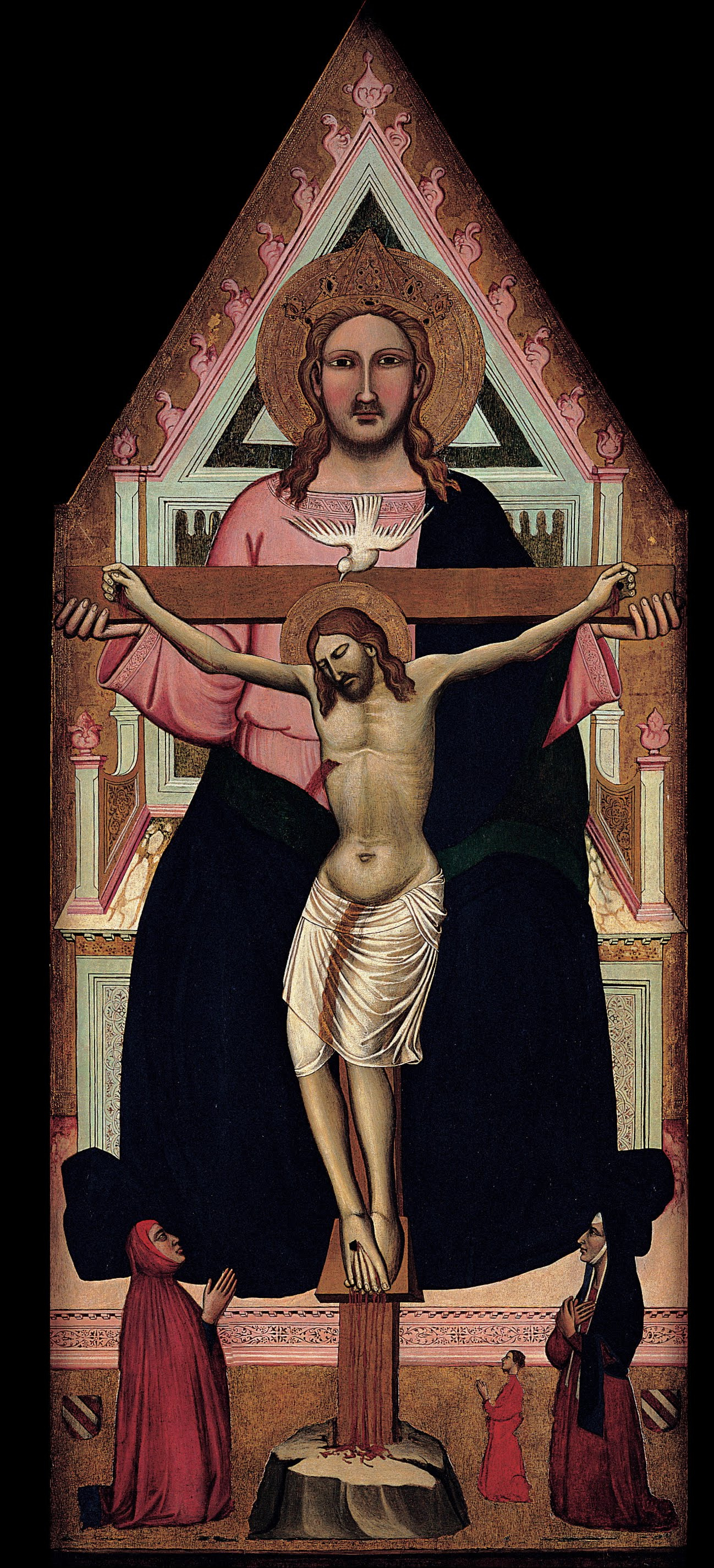
- The Trinity
- Born: 1340; Florence
- Died: 1414 (aged 73–74); Florence
- Known for: Painter

Niccolò di Pietro Gerini (c. 1340 – 1414) was an Italian painter of the late Gothic period, active mainly in his native Florence although he also carried out commissions in Pisa and Prato. He was not an innovative painter but relied on traditional compositions in which he placed his figures in a stiff and dramatic movement.

== Early life and family ==
Gerini's father, Pietro Geri, was registered as a member of the Guild of Saint Luke in 1339. In 1368, Niccolò Dipintore is identified as a member of the Arte dei Medici e Speziali Guild (Guild of Doctors and Apothecaries, which included painters until 1378) in Florence. Niccolo worked mainly in Florence, although he also carried out commissions in Rome at the Vatican, and in Pisa and Prato.

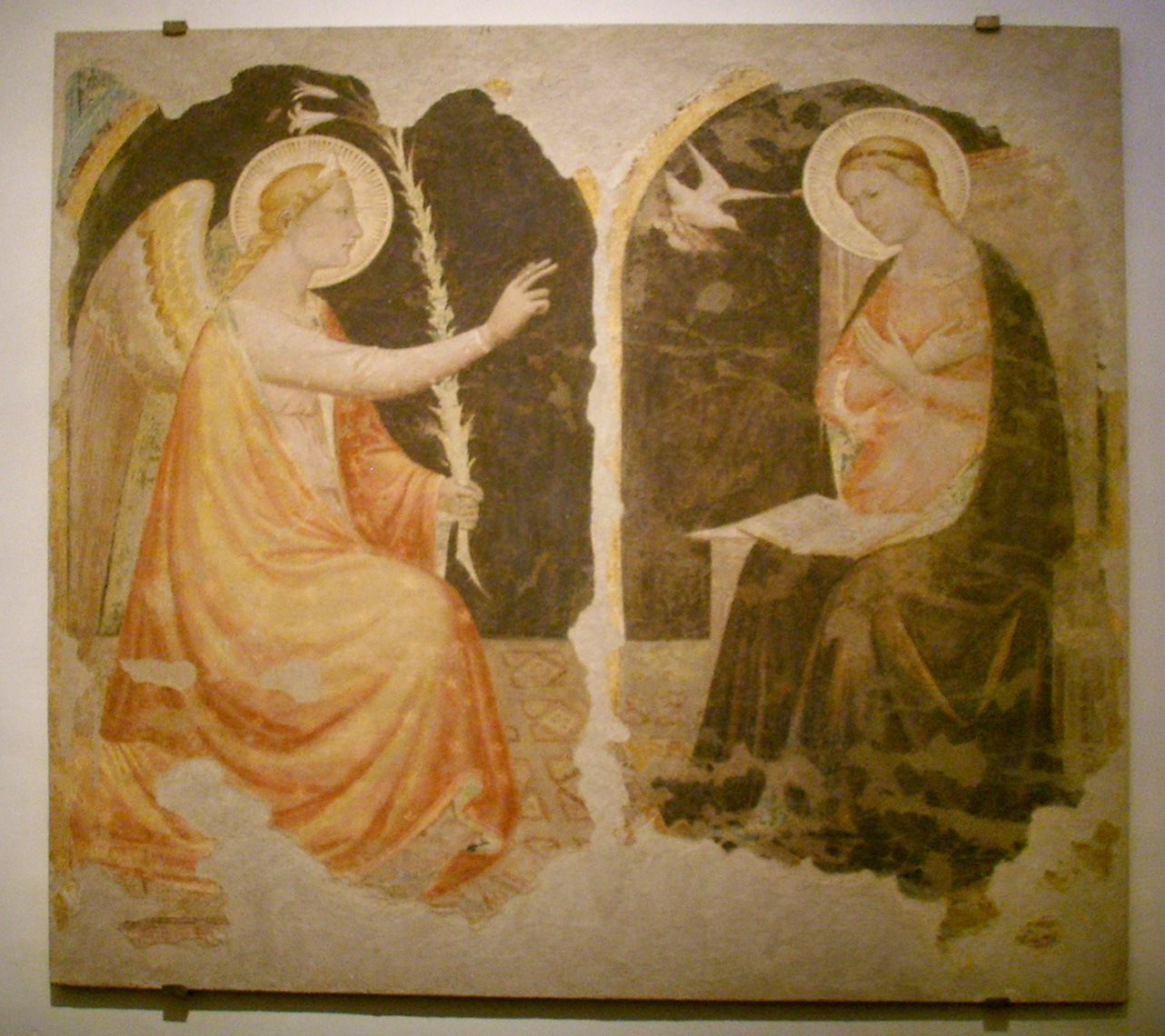
Santa Felicita, Florence, Annunciation

Another important artist, Lorenzo di Niccolò di Martino, trained in Niccolò di Pietro Gerini's workshop and later collaborated with him, but was not his son as is sometimes erroneously stated. Gerini did have a son named Bindo di Niccolo di Pietro Gerini, born in 1363, who was registered as a member of the Guild of Saint Luke in 1408.

== Career ==
Gerini represents the school of Giotto di Bondone, in the tradition of Andrea di Orcagna and of Taddeo Gaddi. As is typical for Gothic depictions, Gerini's figures have large chins, sloping foreheads, and sharp noses whilst their bodies are squat and frontally displaced.

Gerini is recorded as collaborating with Jacopo di Cione on frescoes for the Guild hall of the Judges and Notaries in Florence in 1366. He is the Niccolaio Dipintore who worked with Jacopo di Cione on the altarpiece of the Coronation of the Virgin commissioned by the Albizzi family for San Pier Maggiore, Florence in 1370. He was paid 12 golden florins per disegnare la tavola dell’altare (for the design of the altarpiece) in November of the same year. In addition to the altarpiece, he designed the elaborate throne canopy, while Jacopo di Cione actually produced the piece.

He collaborated with Jacopo di Cione on a second Coronation of the Virgin (Accademia, Florence) in 1372. It was commissioned by the mint of Florence Zecca Vecchia that same year. In 1383 Gerini again worked with Cione on a fresco of the Annunciation in the Palazzo dei Priori, Volterra. This fresco clearly shows the work of two very different artists: Niccolò di Pietro Gerini (design and very fine painting) and Jacopo di Cione (broadly painted saints and side decoration).

In 1386 Niccolò frescoed the façade of the Loggia del Bigallo, Florence. He also frescoed the Basilica of Sant'Ambrogio in Milano and executed a Crucifixion in the church of Santa Felicita, both in Florence. His hand can be also seen in the sacristy of the basilica of Santa Croce in the same city, depicting scenes from the life of Christ.

Between 1391 and 1392 he worked in Prato where he frescoed Palazzo Datini and the Church of San Francesco with Lorenzo di Niccolò and Agnolo Gaddi. He also frescoed the capitals of the church of San Francesco, Pisa.

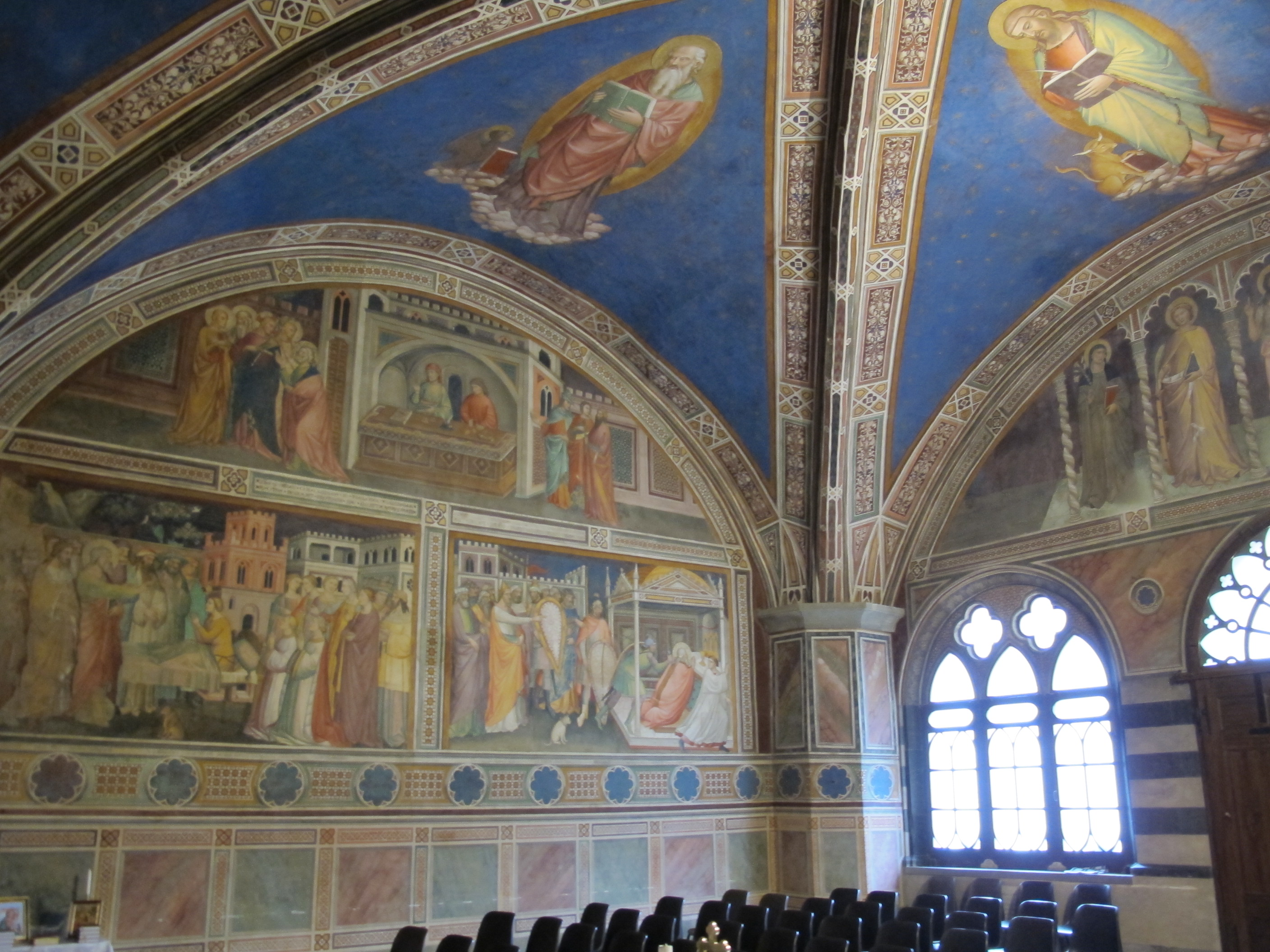
Cappella Migliorati at the church of San Francesco, Prato
