= Palazzo Datini =

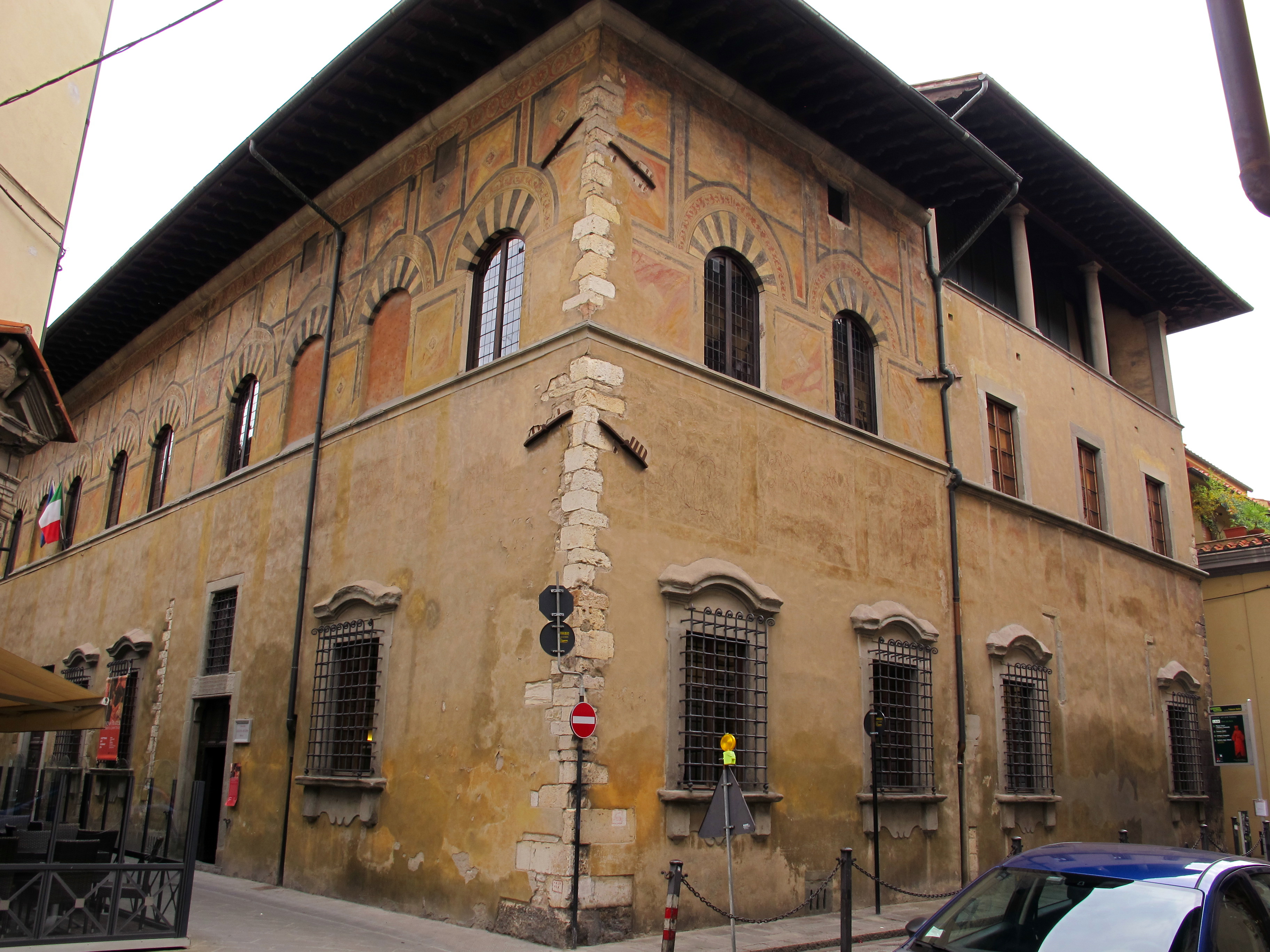
- Facade of the Palace
- Interactive map of the Palazzo Datini area

General information
- Location: Prato, via Ser Lapo Mazzei, 43
- Coordinates: 43°52′47.98″N 11°5′43.62″E
- Construction started: 12th century
- Completed: 14th century

Website
- Official Website

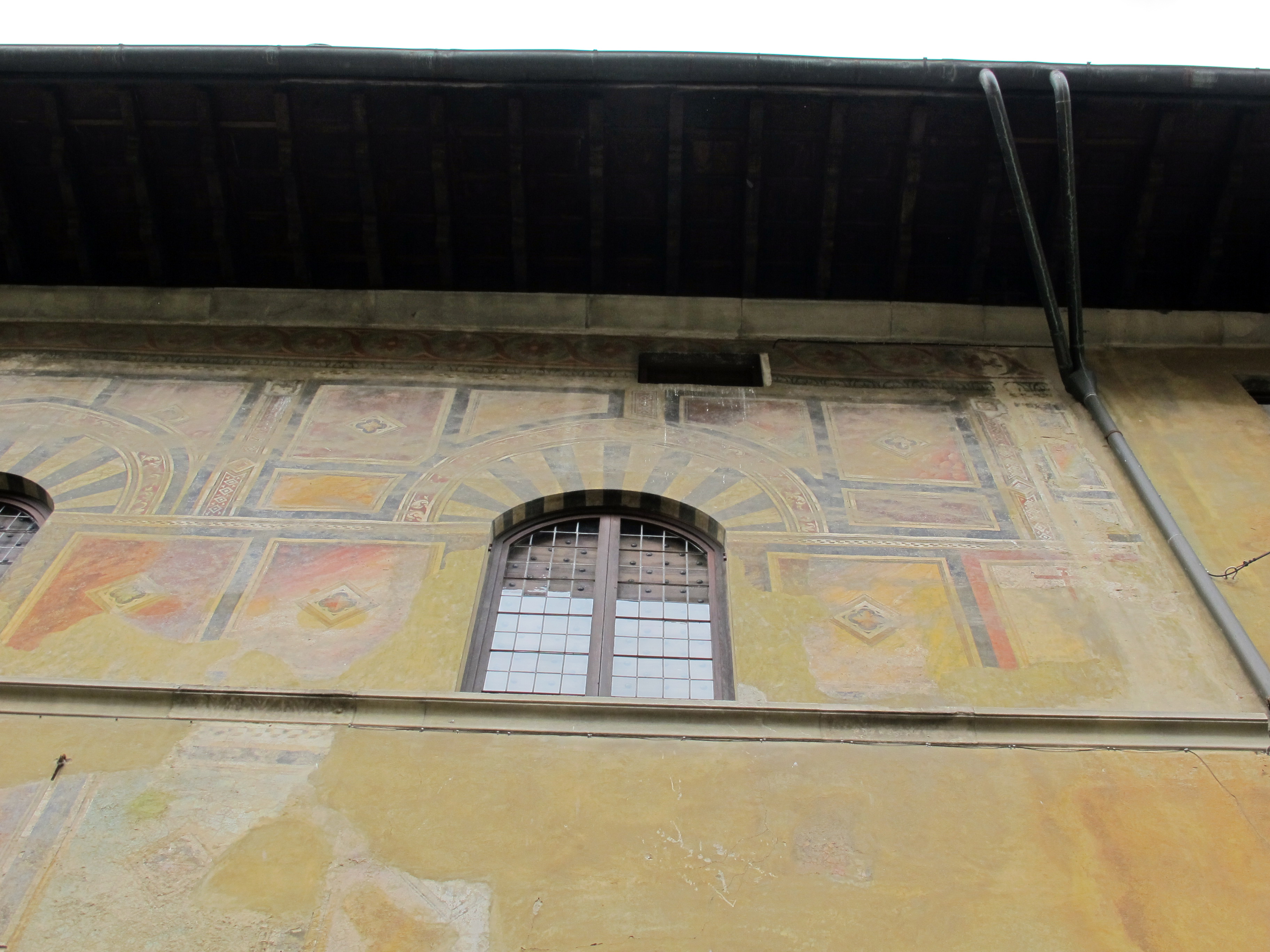
External frescoes.

Palazzo Datini is a late 14th-century palace in Prato, Tuscany, central Italy. In 2015, the palace housed the offices of the Fondazione Casa Pia dei Ceppi, a charitable organization and a museum and archive.

It houses the State Archives of Prato.

== History ==
Begun in 1383 as the residence of merchant Francesco Datini, it was subsequently decorated by artists such as Agnolo Gaddi and Niccolò di Pietro Gerini, both internally and externally, although the latter paintings are rather damaged. It once included, in front of the current façade, a botanical garden which was among the first ones in Italy. In 1409 the palazzo was visited by Pope Alexander V and Louis II of Anjou, King of Naples.

After Datini's death, all the papers from his archive were shut in a wall of the buildings; they were discovered, nearly intact, in the 19th century and are now housed, for a total of some 150,000 documents, in the building.

Filippo Lippi's Madonna del Ceppo was once located in the palace's garden.
