= State Archives of Prato =

State archival institution in Prato, Italy

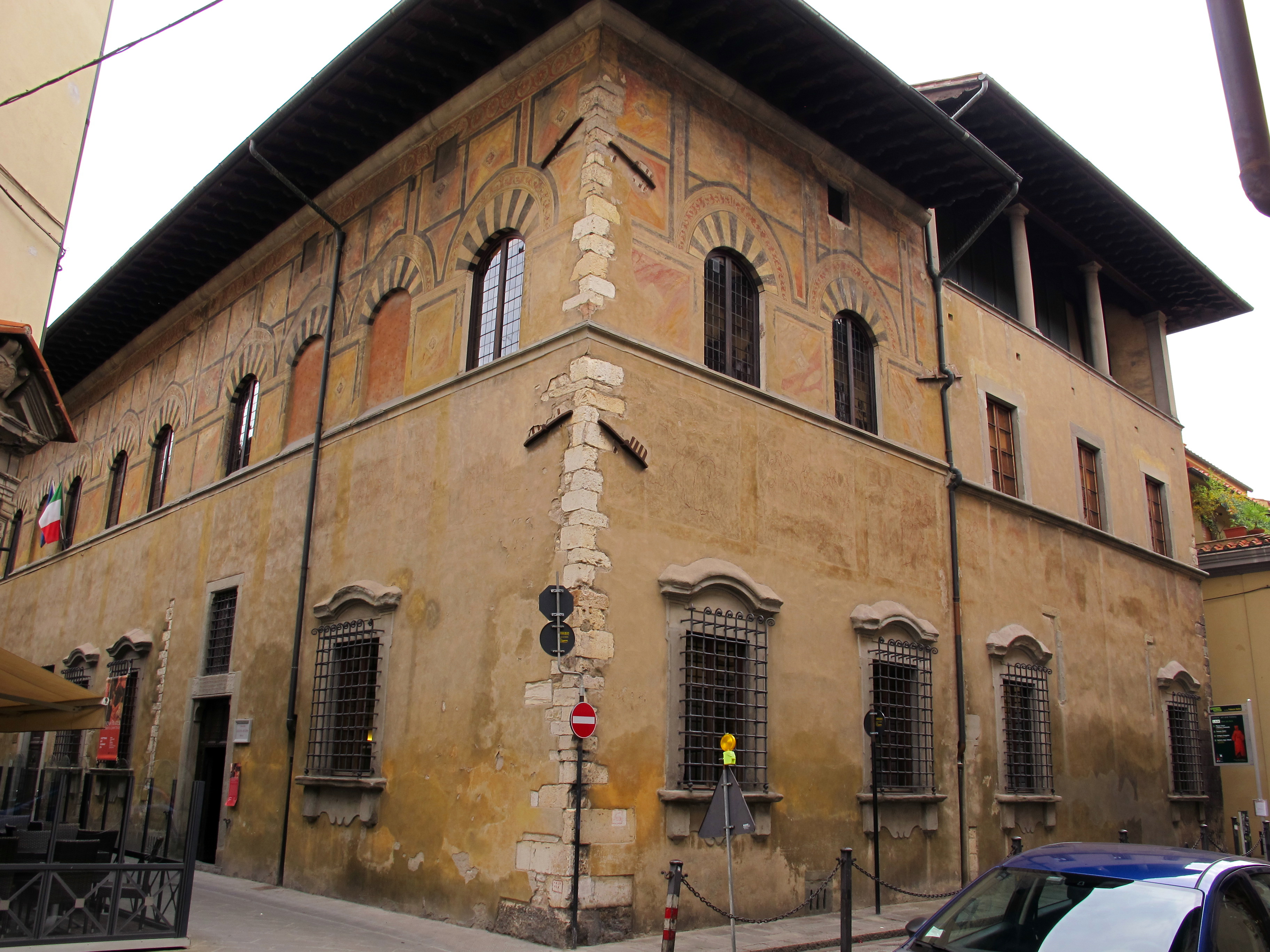
- Palazzo Datini
- Interactive map of State Archives of Prato
- 43°52′49″N 11°05′44″E
- Location: Prato, Tuscany, Italy
- Type: State archive
- Established: 1957

Building information
- Building: Palazzo Datini
- Website: http://www.archiviodistato.prato.it

The State Archives of Prato (Italian: Archivio di Stato di Prato) is a state archive located in Prato, Tuscany, Italy. It is a peripheral office of the Italian Ministry of Culture responsible for preserving historical records produced by public institutions in the province of Prato, as well as other archival collections of historical significance acquired through deposits, donations, or purchases.

The archive was established in 1957 as a Subsection of the State Archives, being recognized officially as a Section in 1963. It became a full State Archive in 1997, following the creation of the Province of Prato. Since its foundation it has been housed in the late fourteenth-century Palazzo Datini, once the residence of the merchant Francesco Datini. Its collections include the historical archives of the Prato municipality, charitable institutions such as the Casa Pia dei Ceppi, and the important archive of Datini, a major source for the study of late medieval European commerce and society.

== Sources ==
- "Sezione di Archivio di Stato di Prato" (PDF). Guida generale degli Archivi di Stato italiani. Vol. II. Rome: Ministero per i beni culturali e ambientali. Ufficio centrale per i beni archivistici. 1983. pp. 175–198.
- "Archivio di Stato di Prato". Sistema informativo degli Archivi di Stato.
