= Madonna del Ceppo =

Painting by Filippo Lippi

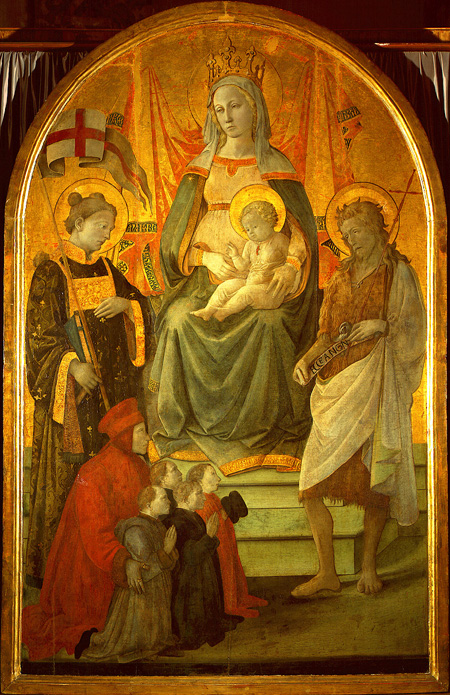
- Artist: Filippo Lippi
- Year: c. 1452–1453
- Medium: Oil on panel
- Dimensions: 187 cm × 120 cm (74 in × 47 in)
- Location: Museo Civico, Prato

The Madonna del Ceppo is a painting by the Italian Renaissance painter Filippo Lippi, commissioned to him between 1452 and 1453. It is housed in the Civic Museum of Prato, Italy (though exposed in the local Museum of Wall Painting, in the Palazzo degli Alberti). The name derives from the fact that it was located over a pit of the garden of Pia Casa dei Ceppi in Palazzo Datini, in Prato.

In the centre, the Madonna and Child are flanked by Saints Stephen and John the Baptist; below, Francesco Datini presents to the Virgin the four Buonomini ("Honourable Men") of the Ceppo: Andrea di Giovanni Bertelli, Filippo Manassei, Pietro Pugliesi and Jacopo degli Obizzi.

== See also ==
- Stories of St. Stephen and St. John the Baptist
