= Prato Textile Museum =

Textile museum and library in Prato, Italy

Coordinates: 43.8764°N 11.0637°E

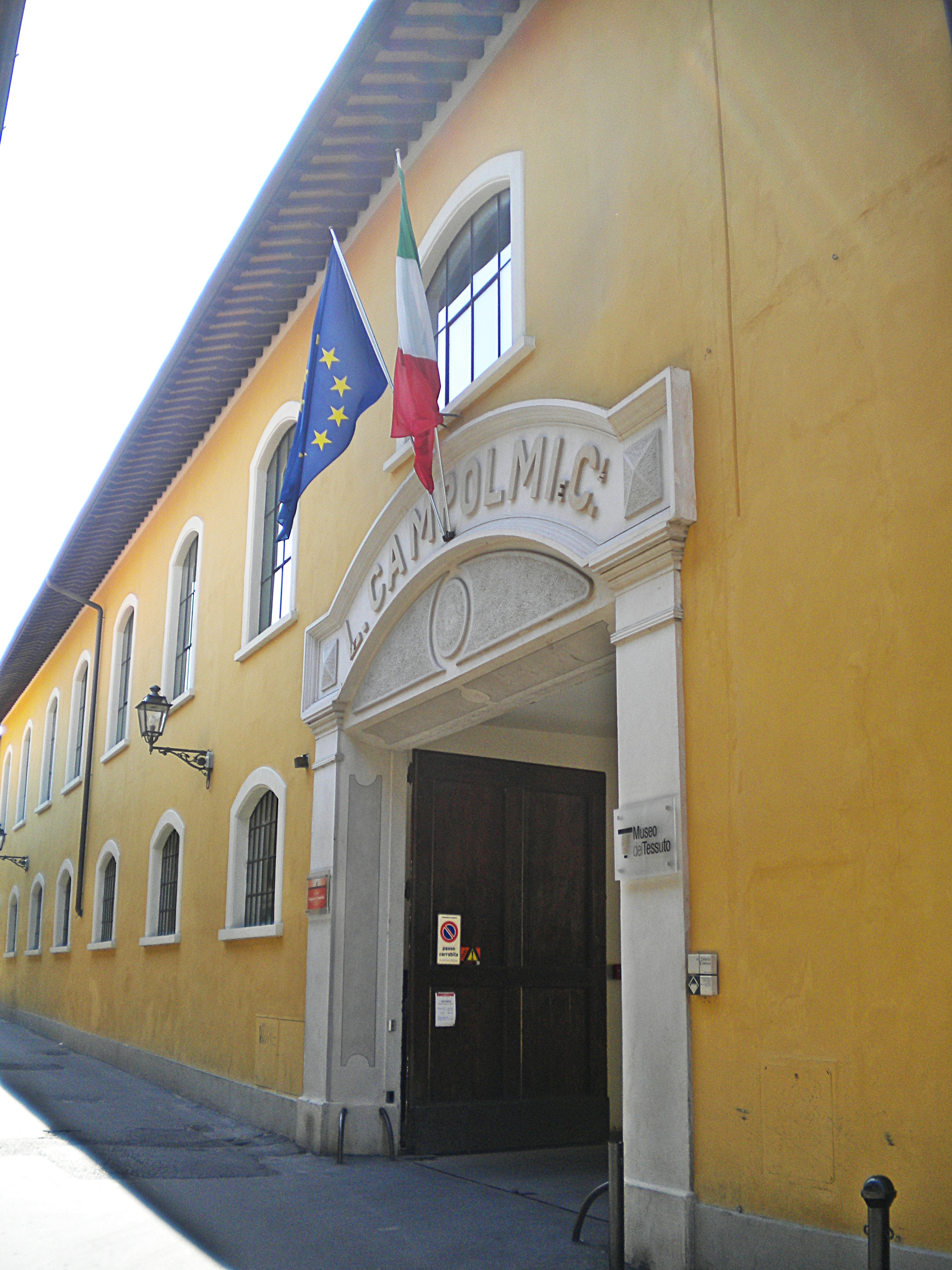

The Campolmi Factory, the Prato Textile museum and Lazzerini Library is a textile museum and library in Prato in Tuscany, Italy. The museum is an Anchor point on the European Route of Industrial Heritage.

== Context ==
Prato Textile Museum initially opened in 1975 at Tullio Buzzi Technical Institute, from May 2003, it has been in the converted Campolmi textile mill in the centre of Prato. It is Italy's largest centre for the study, conservation and exhibition of historic and contemporary textiles. The Prato Textile Museum Foundation was founded in November 2003 as a partnership between the city, the bands and the craft unions.

== History ==
The city of Prato has been producing woollen cloth since the 12th century. Industrialization in the mid-19th century caused the area to develop an industrial production system. Following the second world war, contrary to trends elsewhere in Europe, the industries of Prato expanded: by the early 1980s, the area was model industrial district. Changes in lifestyle and the development of new technologies made Prato textile companies abandon their traditional carded wool businesses and investigate new markets.

== Buildings ==
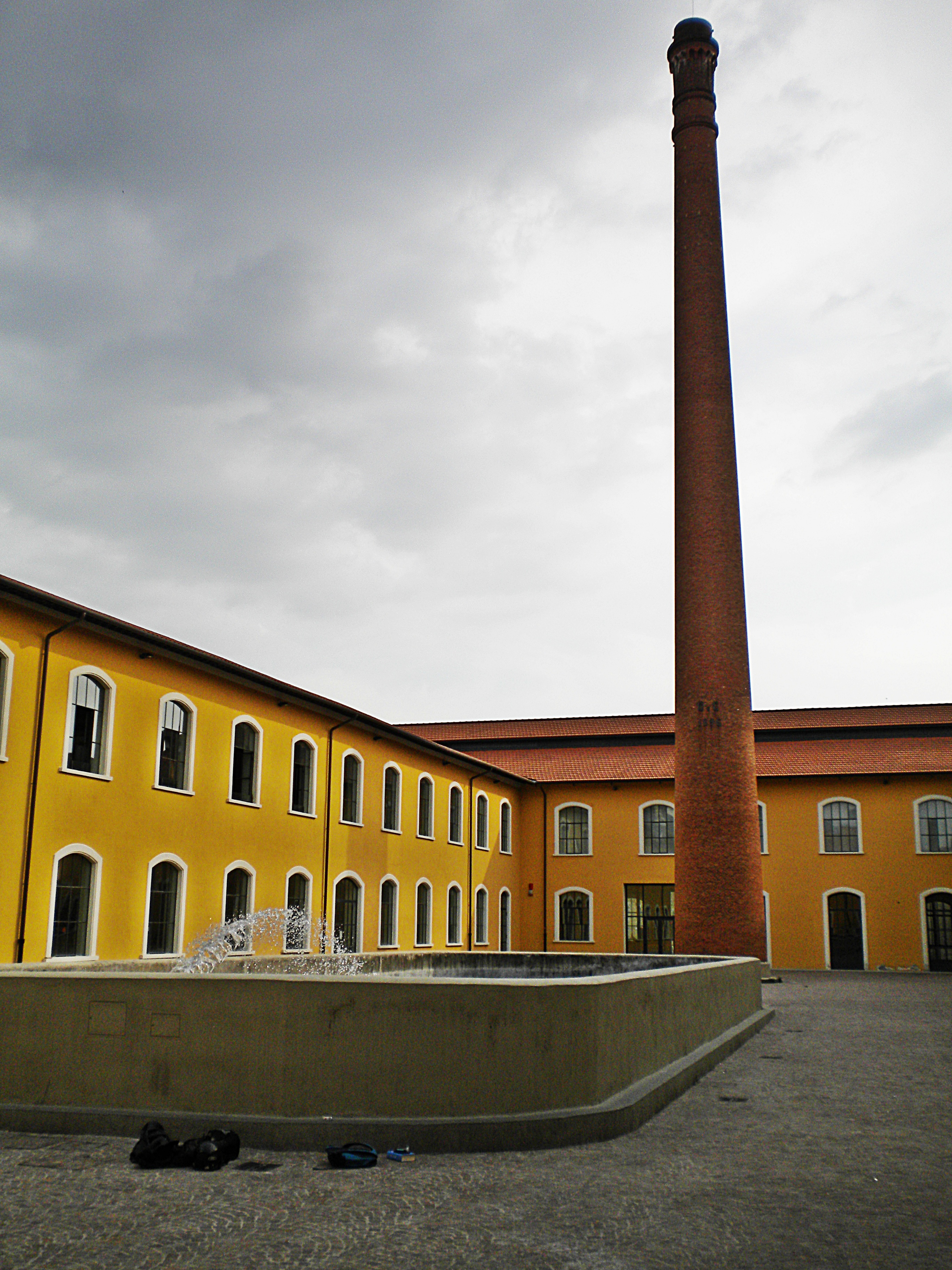
Courtyard with mill lodge and chimney

Prato Textile Museum is housed in the Cimatoria Campolmi Leopoldo e C. 8,500 m^{2} textile mill, the only 19th-century industrial site within the 14th-century walls of the city. It 2,400 m^{2} of the long west wing (ground and first floor) of the architectural complex, sharing the building with the Prato Municipal Library (Lazzerini Library). The site has been used for the production of textiles since the Middle Ages. There was a gualchiera (wool fulling mill) on the same site in 1326.

The mill was situated on the banks of the Gora del Fiume Romita (aka the Gora delle Gualchiere), a canal dug in the first half of the 13th century specifically to enable the waters of the River Bisenzio to be used for textile production. It was later acquired by the church and transformed into St. Clare's Mill, a flour mill, which remained active throughout the 18th century.

In March 1863, it was bought by Vincenzo Campolmi, Luigi Cecconi and David Alphandery, established again as a water-powered textile factory. The resulting Campolmi textile mill gained reputation for the quality of its textile finishings. By the end of the 19th century, Campolmi textile mill had developed into a two-storey rectangular building built around a courtyard with a reservoir (lodge) and a 40-metre brick chimney in the centre.

The factory was engaged in training and there were many spin off companies. The final expansion was the construction of the dyeing plant, with noted ogival-ceiling.

The company ceased trading in 1994.

== Museum ==
Cost of restoration: (1999-2006)
Date	Event	Cost
July 1999	Purchase of the complex	€3,600,000
December 1999 – 2002	Restoration of the museum section of the building	€2,700,000
2002	Creation of Prato Textile Museum	€1,300,000
	including a European Union contribution	€700,000 (DOCUP 2000-2006 funding)

The historic collections are displayed in one of the oldest parts of the entire complex. For conservation reason lighting levels are controlled.

The boiler room contains much of the machinery used to produce the steam necessary to drive the original Campolmi textile mill.

== Library ==
Named after the Italian sculptor Alessandro Lazzerini, the Library Lazzerini project was the combined effort of Marco Mattei, architect and designer, Fabrizio Cecconi, architect, and Blacks Franco, director of the Library Lazzerini. The total cost of the renovation for the complex, including the museum and library was approximately 18 million euros.
