= Biblioteca Roncioniana =

Coordinates: 43.879718°N 11.096251°E

The Biblioteca Roncioniana is a public library, founded in 1726, and located on Piazza San Francesco #27 in the historic center of Prato, region of Tuscany, Italy. The library stands across the park from the church of San Francesco.

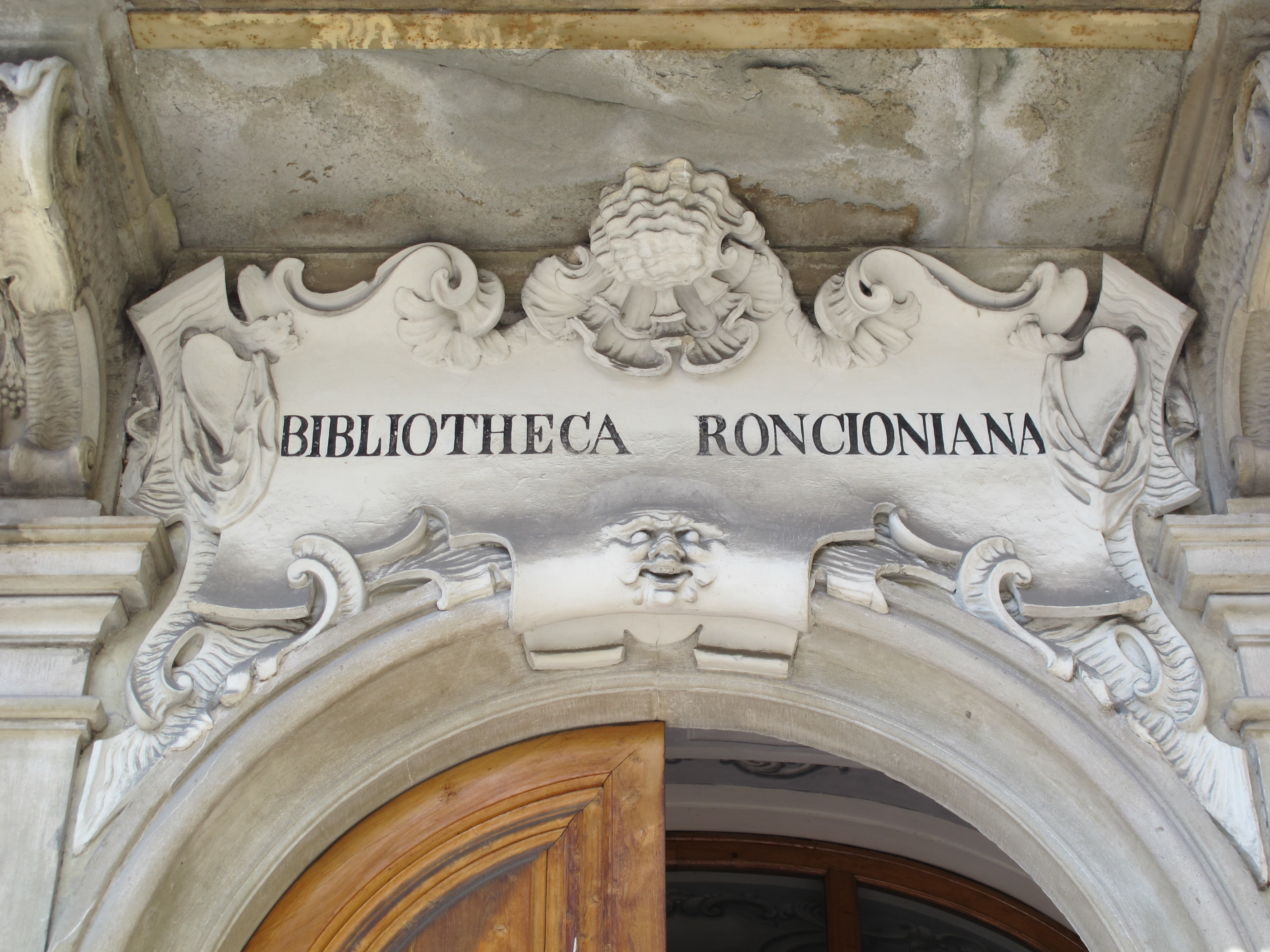
Entrance portal to the library

== History ==
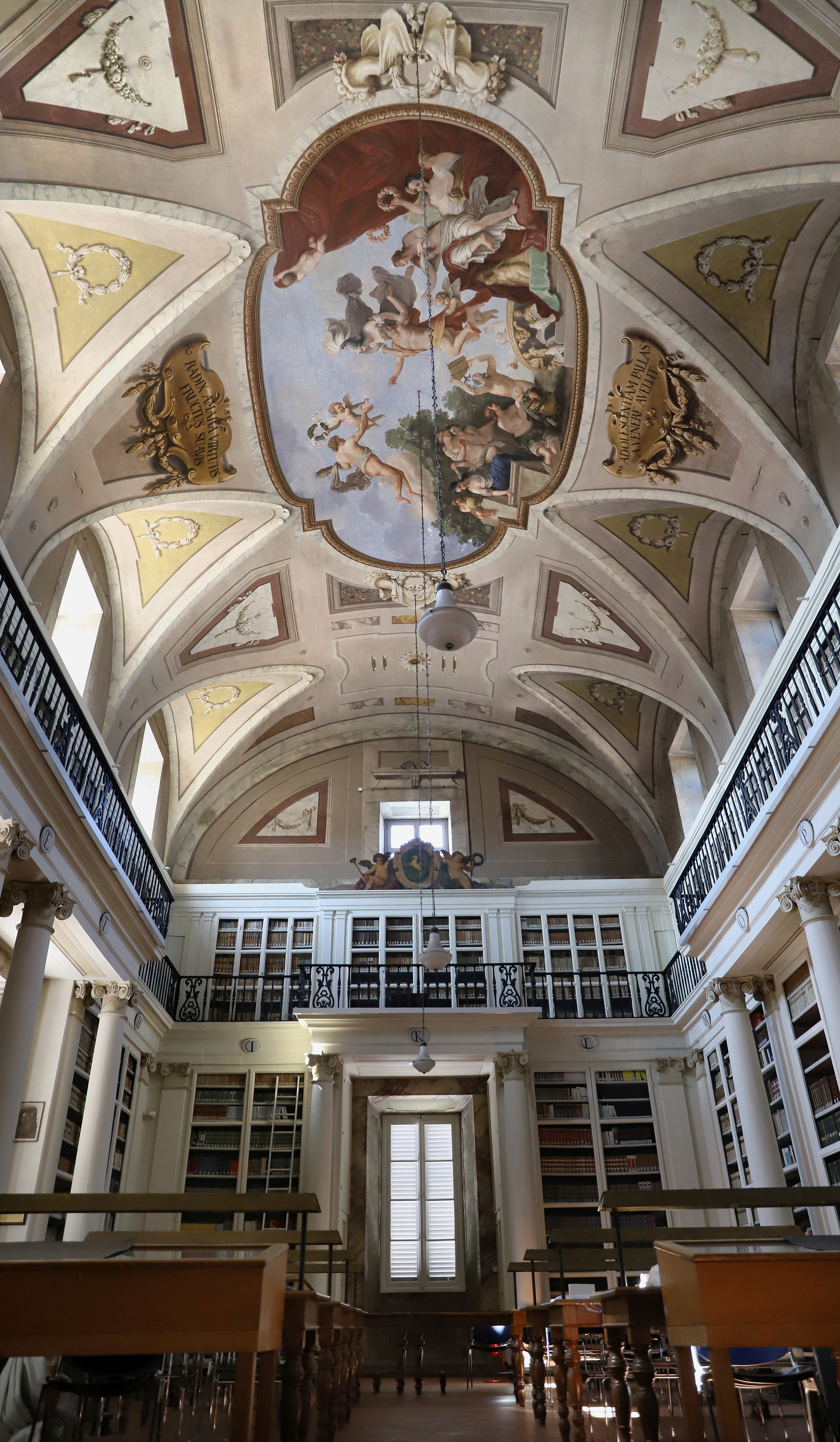
Reading room with frescoed ceiling

The library was founded and endowed by the will of the aristocrat Marco di Emilio Roncioni (1600 - 1677). The library was provisionally open in 1722, but only since 1766 has it been hosted in a portion of the Palazzo Roncioni, located in the historic center of Prato.

The palace was built 1751-1766 likely on the original design by Antonio Saller, but modified later by Francesco Arrighi and Stefano di Rigo, who brought it to completion. The entrance atrium has a 15th-century terracotta images of the Arcangel Raphael and Tobias by the studio of Andrea della Robbia. The entrance has frescoed panels with trompe-l'œil architecture. The ceiling of main reading room was frescoed (1789) by Luigi Catani and depicts Sloth and Wisdom (images after works of Pietro da Cortona). On the wall are two mappamondi (world maps) based on the 16th century work of Mercator (by Gerard Kremer, 1512–1594).

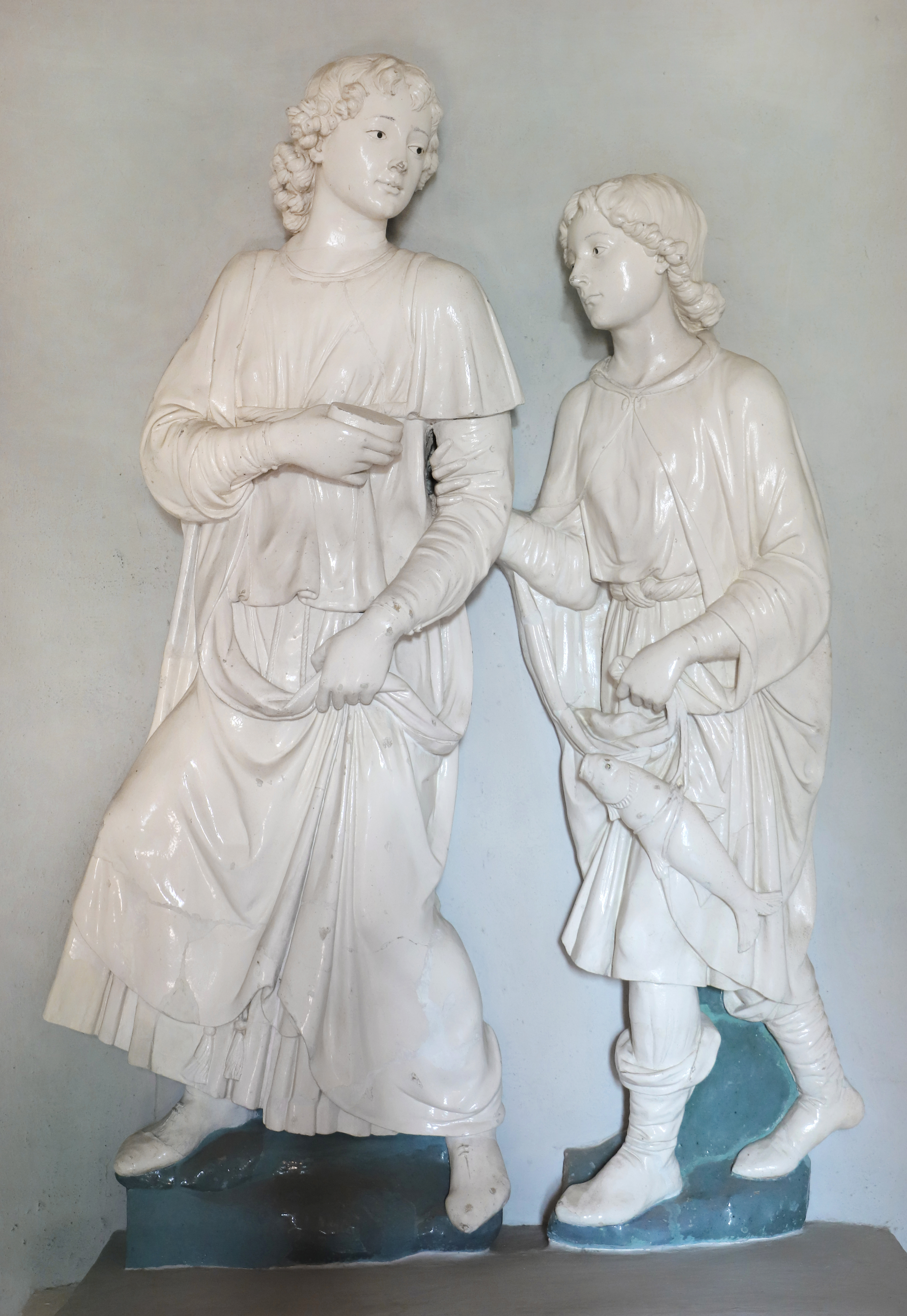
terracota statuary by Della Robbia depicting the Arcangel and Tobias

To the original donation of Roncioni, additional collections have been added over the centuries, including in 1727, the collections of Bernardino Piazzini and by the canon Giovan Battista Casotti in 1737. In the 19th century, the library acquired the collection of the lawyer Giovacchino Benini and Adele Guerrazzi Mazzoni, and additionally it acquired some of the libraries from suppressed monasteries in Prato. Other donations were provided by Cesare Guasti, monsignor Ferdinando Baldanzi, monsignor Giovacchino Limberti, monsignor Giovanni Pierallini, canon Luigi Sacchi, and canon Giovacchino Pelagatti.

In 2022, the collection included 39 books from the 15th-century; 1638 volumes from the 16th-century; 2268 volumes from the 17th-century, and 50,527 volumes and journals from subsequent periods.
