= San Francesco, Prato =

Church building in Prato, Italy

Coordinates: 43°52′45″N 11°05′49″E

Monumental Church of St. Francis Chiesa di San Francesco (Prato) Conventus Sancti Francisci Prati Etrurie
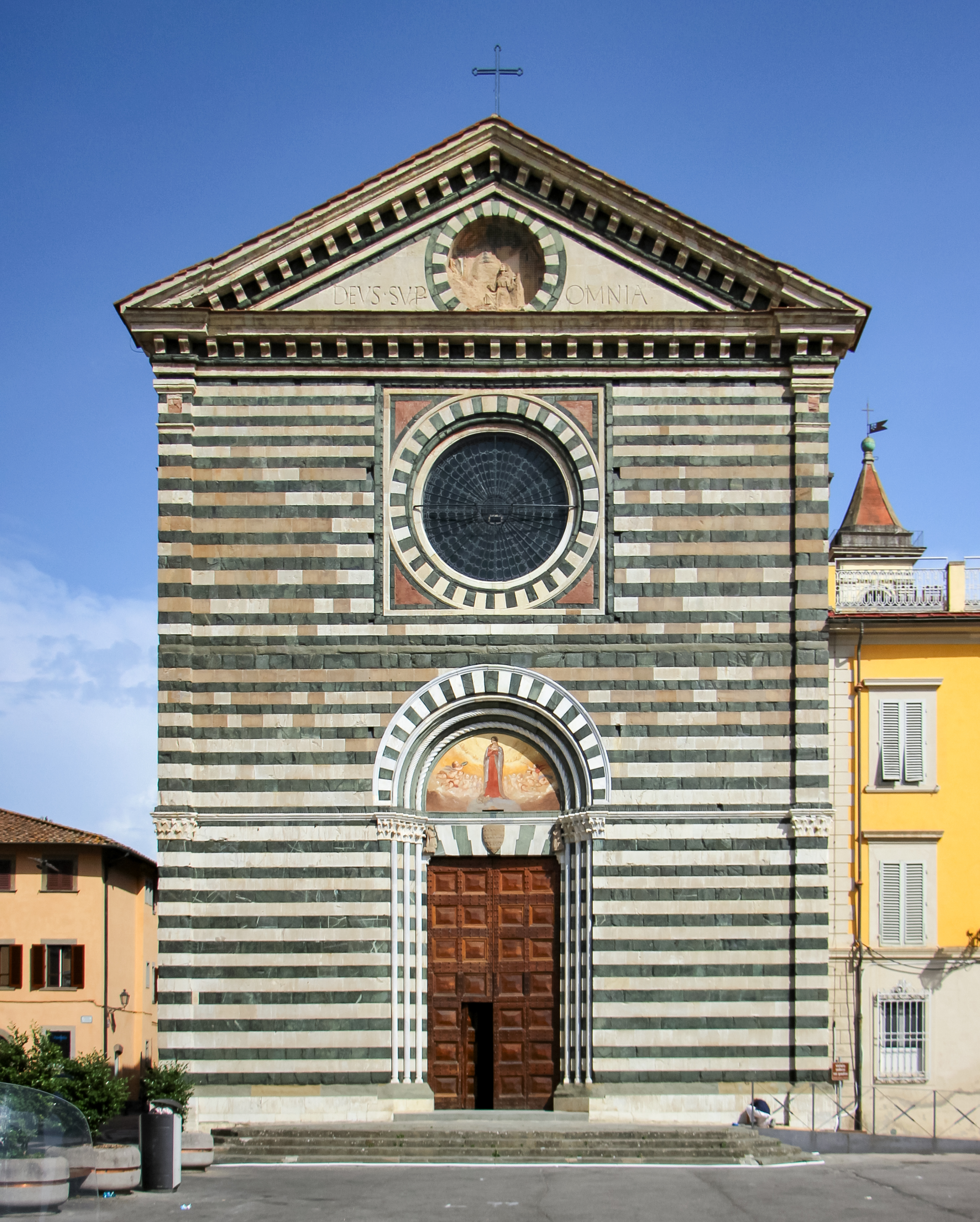

Religion
- Affiliation: Franciscan
- Rite: Roman Catholic
- Year consecrated: October 1285

Location
- Location: Prato, Tuscany, Italy
- Interactive map of Monumental Church of St. Francis; Chiesa di San Francesco (Prato); Conventus Sancti Francisci Prati Etrurie

Architecture
- Type: Church
- Style: Romanesque, Gothic
- Groundbreaking: 12 July 1228
- Completed: 1331 (building) 1422 (façade)

Specifications
- Length: 65 metres (213 ft)
- Width: 20 metres (66 ft)
- Width (nave): 15 metres (49 ft)
- Height (max): 30 metres (98 ft)
- Materials: bricks

Website
- www.sanfrancescoprato.it

San Francesco is a Gothic-style, Roman Catholic church located at the square of the same name, in the historic center of Prato in Tuscany, Italy.

The Church of San Francesco is located in the nucleus of the oldest part of the city of Prato and one of the earliest Franciscan churches with a large (now defunct) convent built on ground donated by the municipality to the friars minor only eight days after the canonization of the saint, in 1228.^{Ref. missing.}

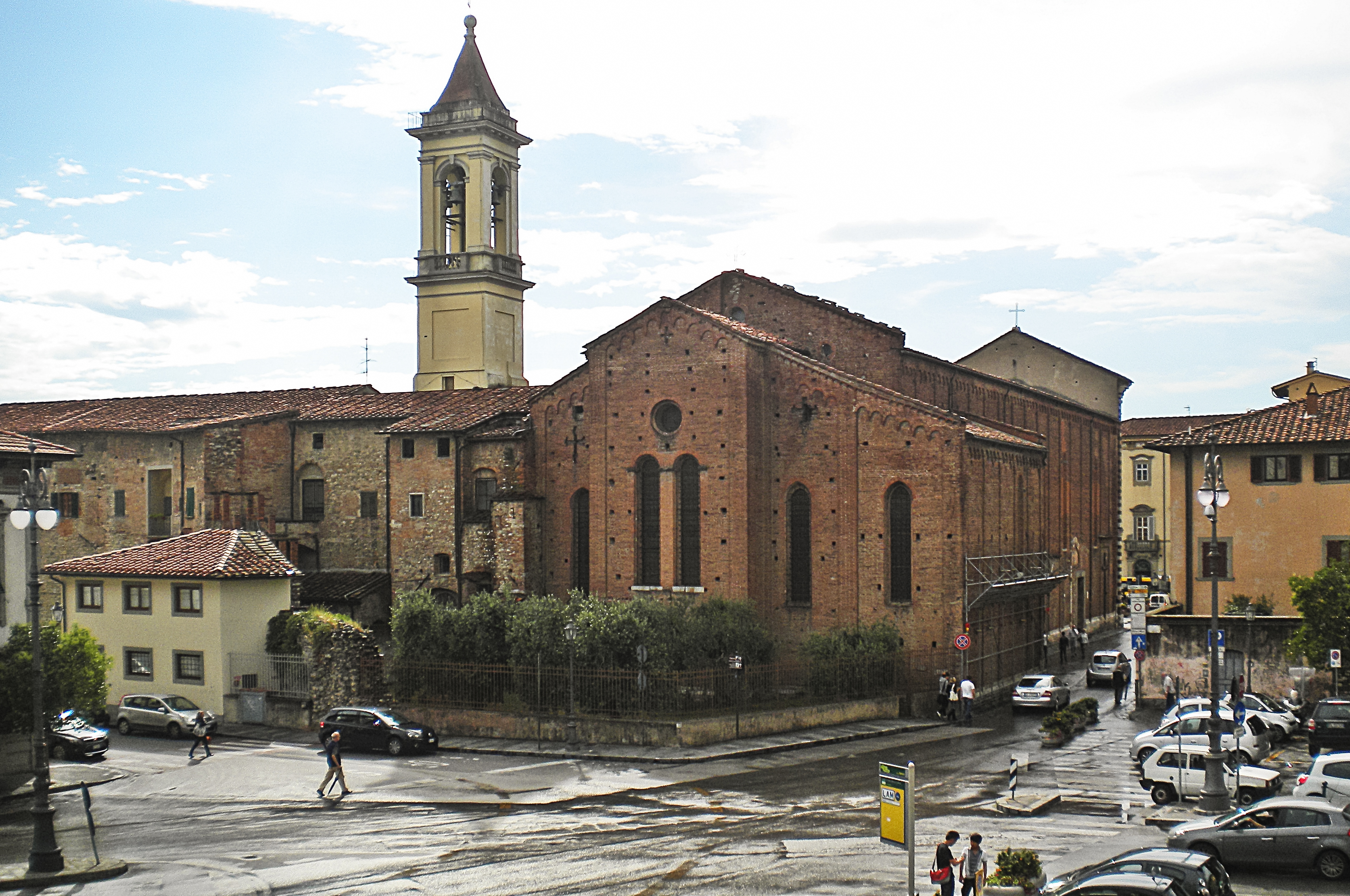
The church and former convent of San Francesco, seen from the Castello across Piazza Santa Maria delle Carceri

== The architecture ==
Construction of the monastery on land donated to the friars minor began a few days after the canonization of the saint in 1228; construction of the present church began in 1281, next to the oratory of the convent. When the building was completed in 1331, the church was among the first buildings in Prato built in brickwork instead of stone.

The 18th-century bell tower was designed by Antonio Benini (1799–1801).

=== The façade ===
The superimposed west façade added at the beginning of the 15th century is divided in bichrome stripes in Alberese marble and green serpentinite. It is about the height of its pediment higher as the building itself. The single central portal is framed by only slightly receding jambs accentuated by a suite of three rather slim marble columns. Almost frieze-like capitals of acanthus leaves are echoed at the merely profiled corners. The architrave is decorated with a coat of arms and two small kneeling donor figures at the ends; its somewhat lightning-like composition of stones is peculiar. Above it a simple three-stepped marble moulding concludes the ground floor. The archivolt continues the pilasters with twisted ribs of different shapes. The arch itself has an outer line drawn from a higher mid-point than the inner half circle, giving it the appearance of a horseshoe arch getting wider towards the cusp. The lunette features a painted Ascension of the Virgin.

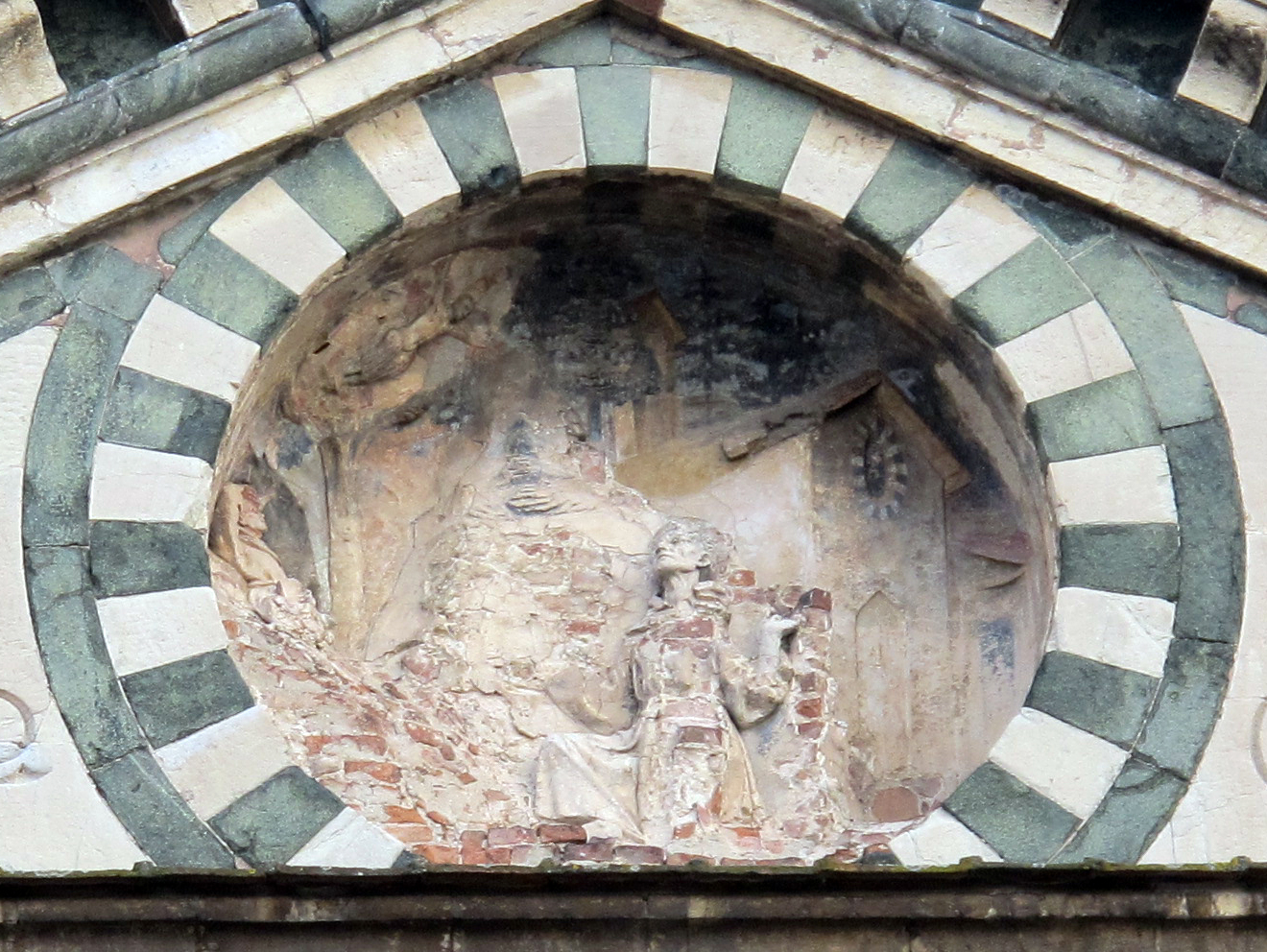
Andrea della Robbia, St. Francis Receiving the Stigmata, second half of 15th ct. (photo taken before its recent restoration)

At about two thirds of the façade's height without the pediment touching the arch's tip three joint stripes of serpentinite (replacing one alternation of white marble) separate the third tier which is dominated by an oculus of similar width as the portal. The roundel is framed by a square with spandrels of reddish stone. Here, the vertical division of the façade in three exactly equal parts gets most obvious, while the actual half height is at the bottom line of the square.

The façade is topped by a classical pediment with corbels running around it encasing a smaller oculus. It shows a sculpture by Andrea della Robbia, composed of bricks, depicting the St. Francis Receiving the Stigmata. Huge majuscules read in Latin: DEVS SVP OMNIA ("God is above all things").

== Interior ==
In 1902, a restoration of the interiors stripped some of the baroque decoration, aiming to leave only the earliest medieval decoration.

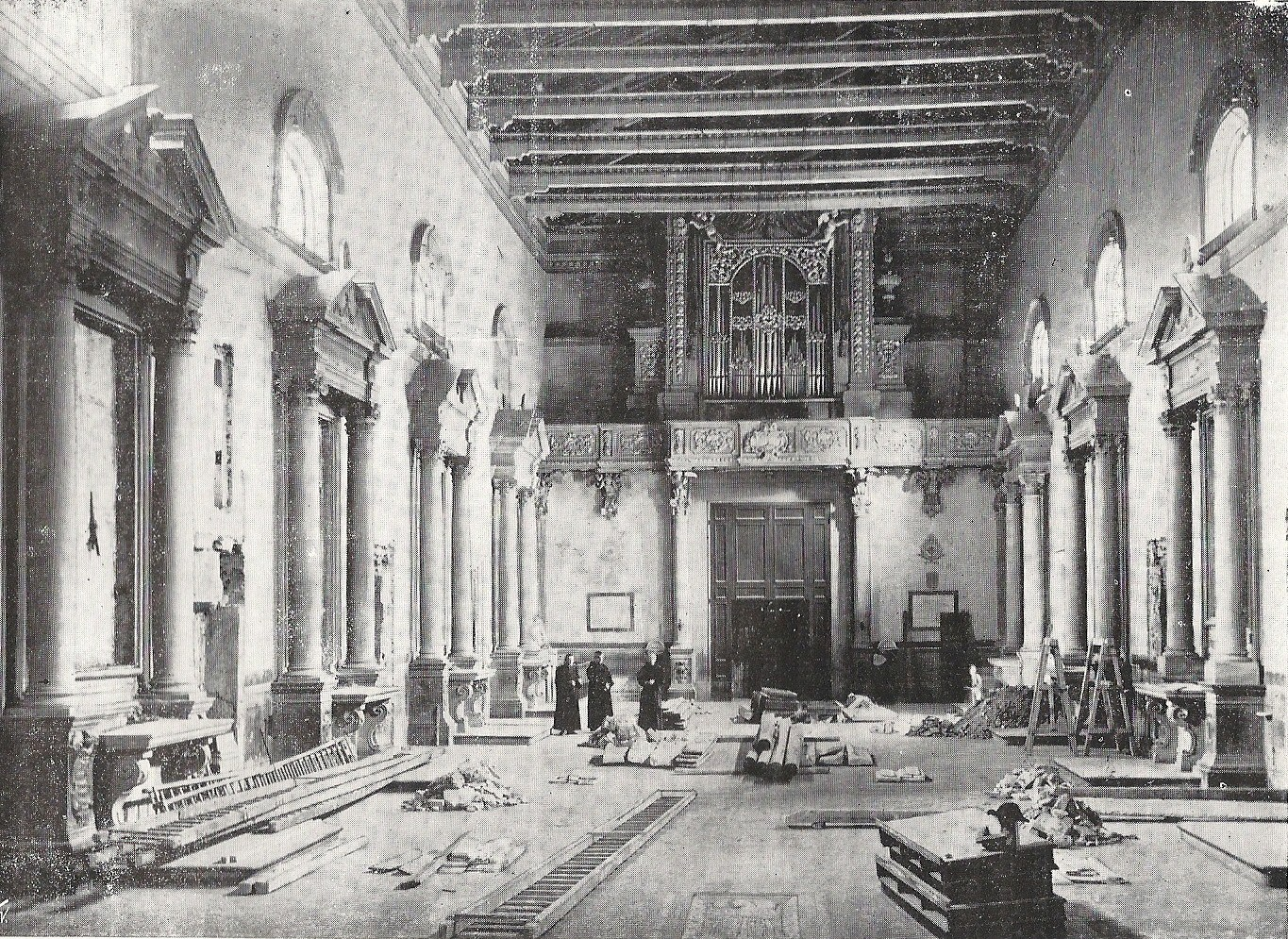
Condition of the church at the beginning of the restoration campaign in 1902

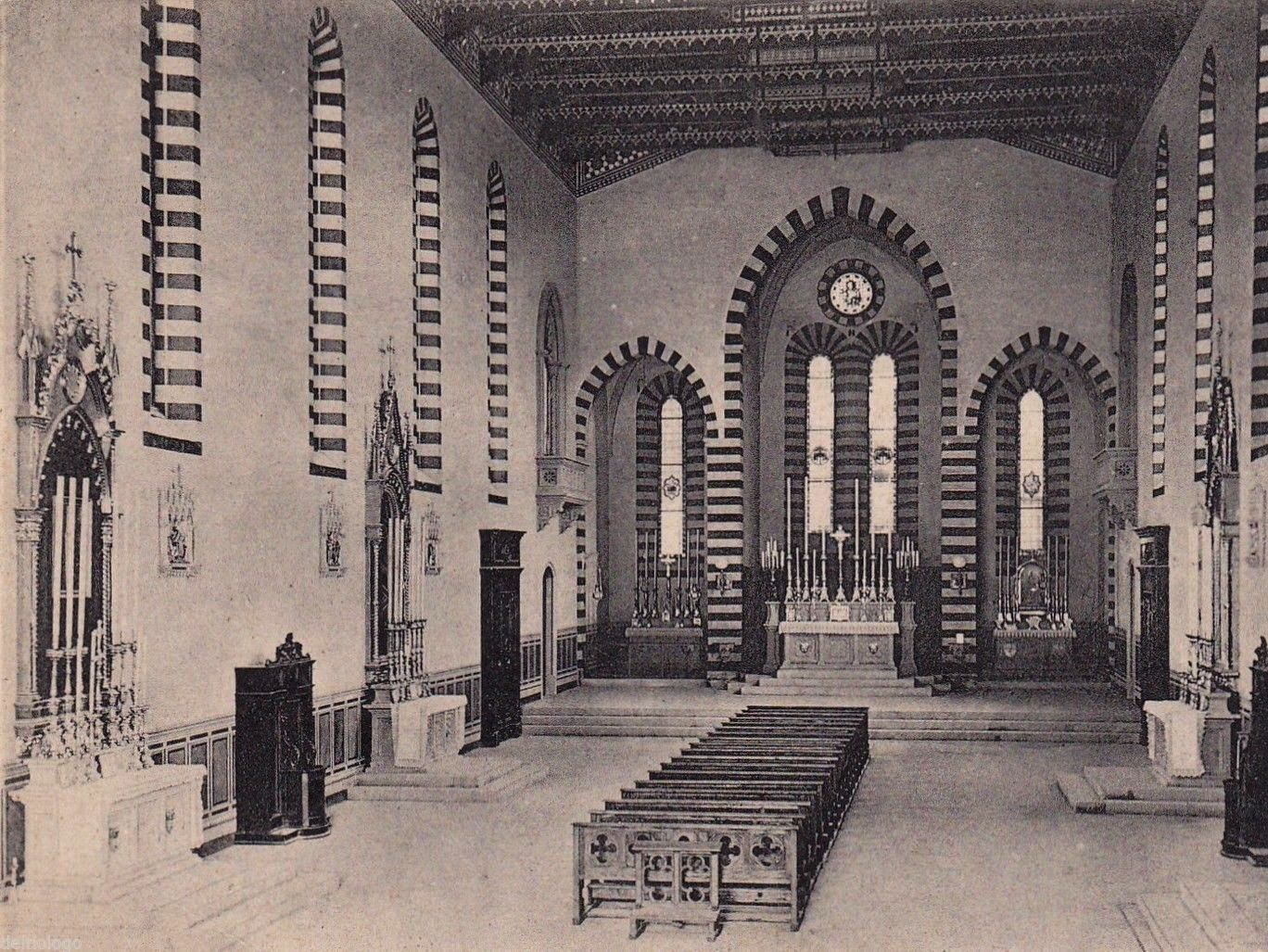
Interior of church after its reconstruction

The polychrome wooden crucifix from the second half of the 14th century was donated by the merchant Francesco Datini. The latter's tomb slab in white marble next to the altar was executed by the Florentine Niccolò di Pietro Lamberti (1411–12). It depicts the figure lying in state on a catafalque, his head on a cushion. At the same time the figure can be read standing within an elaborate Gothic tabernacle.

Next to a Renaissance pulpit in pietra serena is a 15th-century panel with Christ's monogram, which was traditionally added to churches visited by San Bernardino. The funerary monument of Geminiano Inghirami (c. 1460) is attributed to Pasquino da Montepulciano, who also executed the small ciborium on the presbytery wall. Pasquino's style recalls the work of Antonio Rossellino.

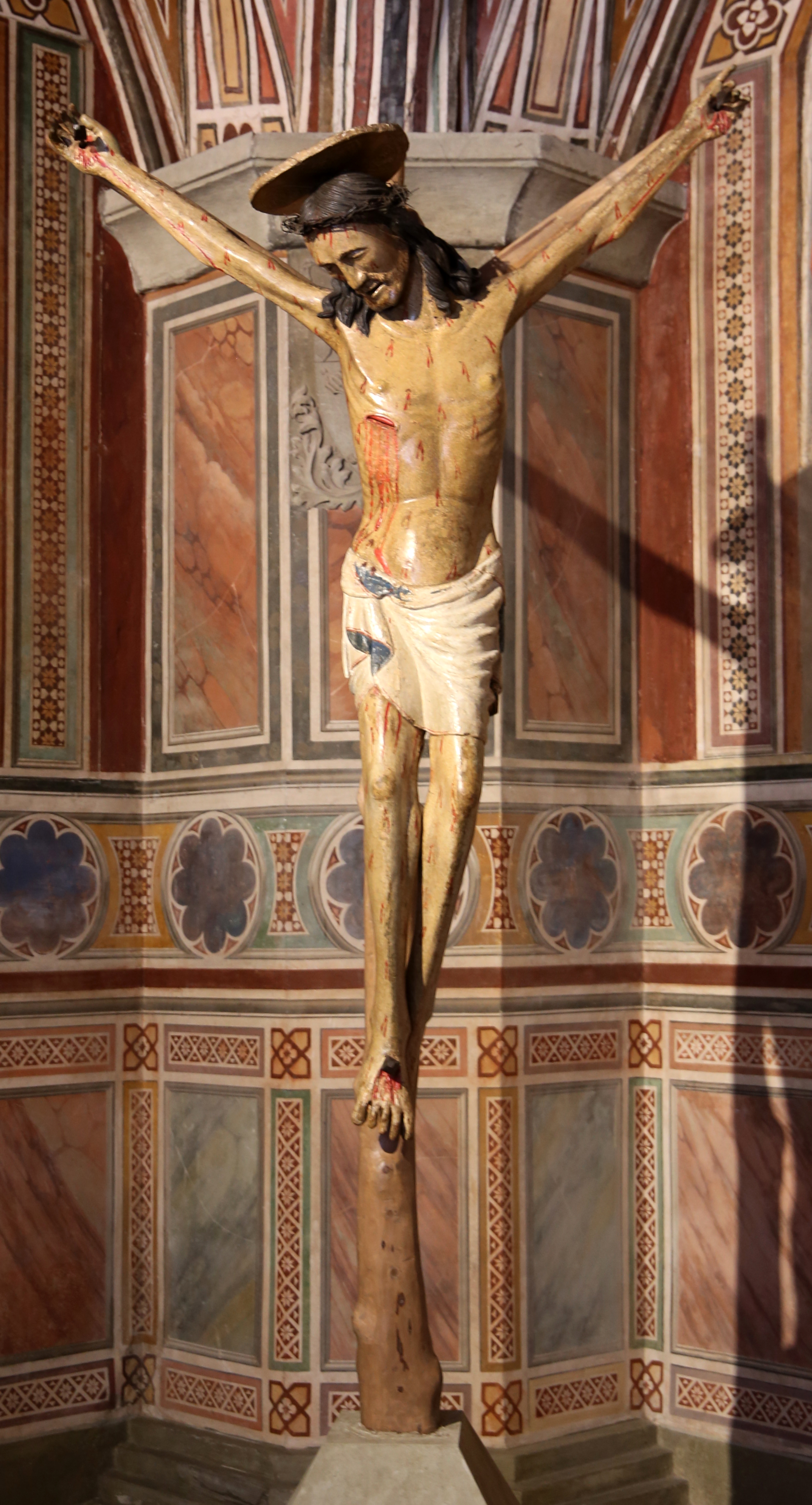
Polychromed crucifix, Florentine school, ca. 1350–1400, donated by Francesco Datini

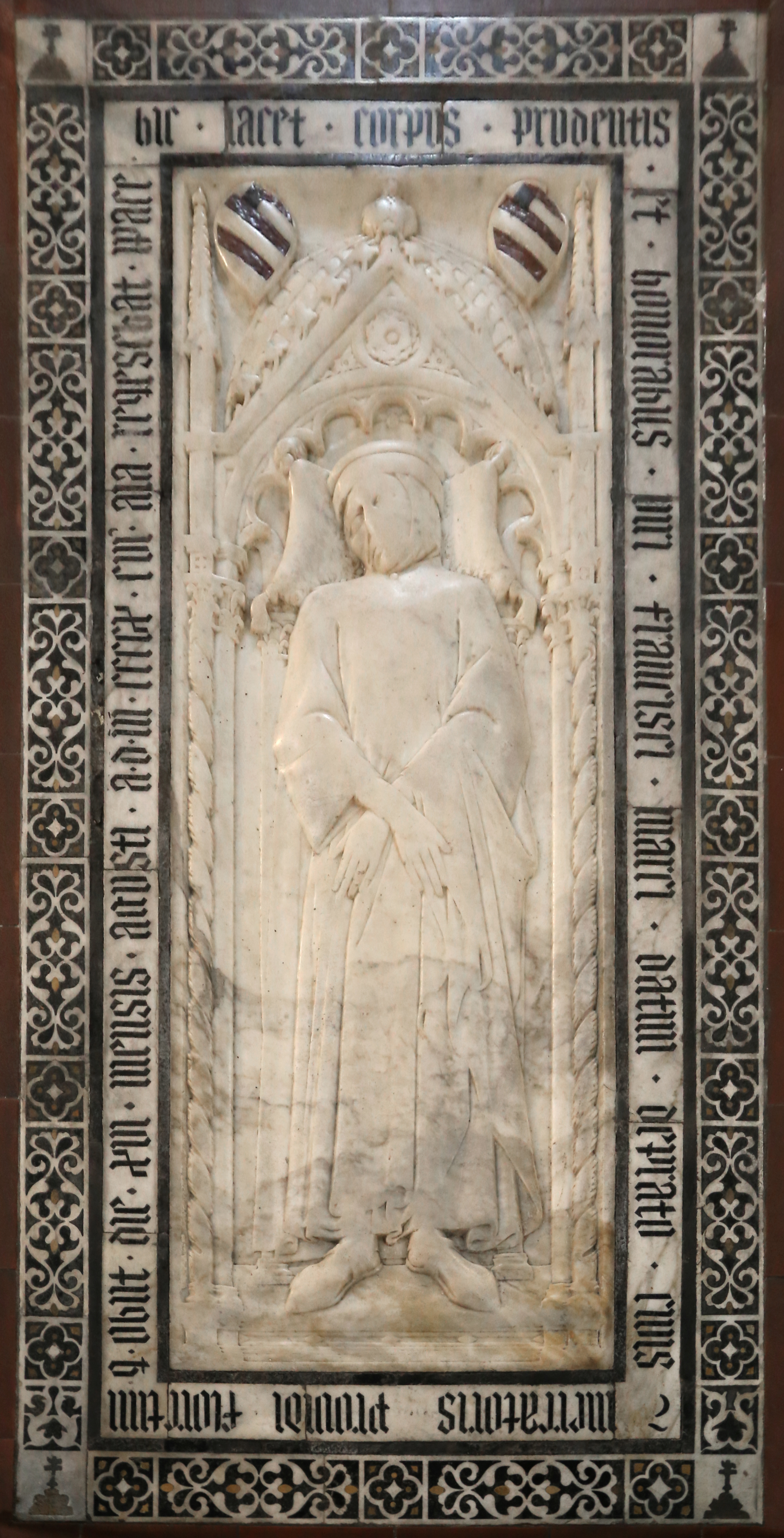
Niccolò di Pietro Lamberti, Tomb slab for Francesco Datini, 1411

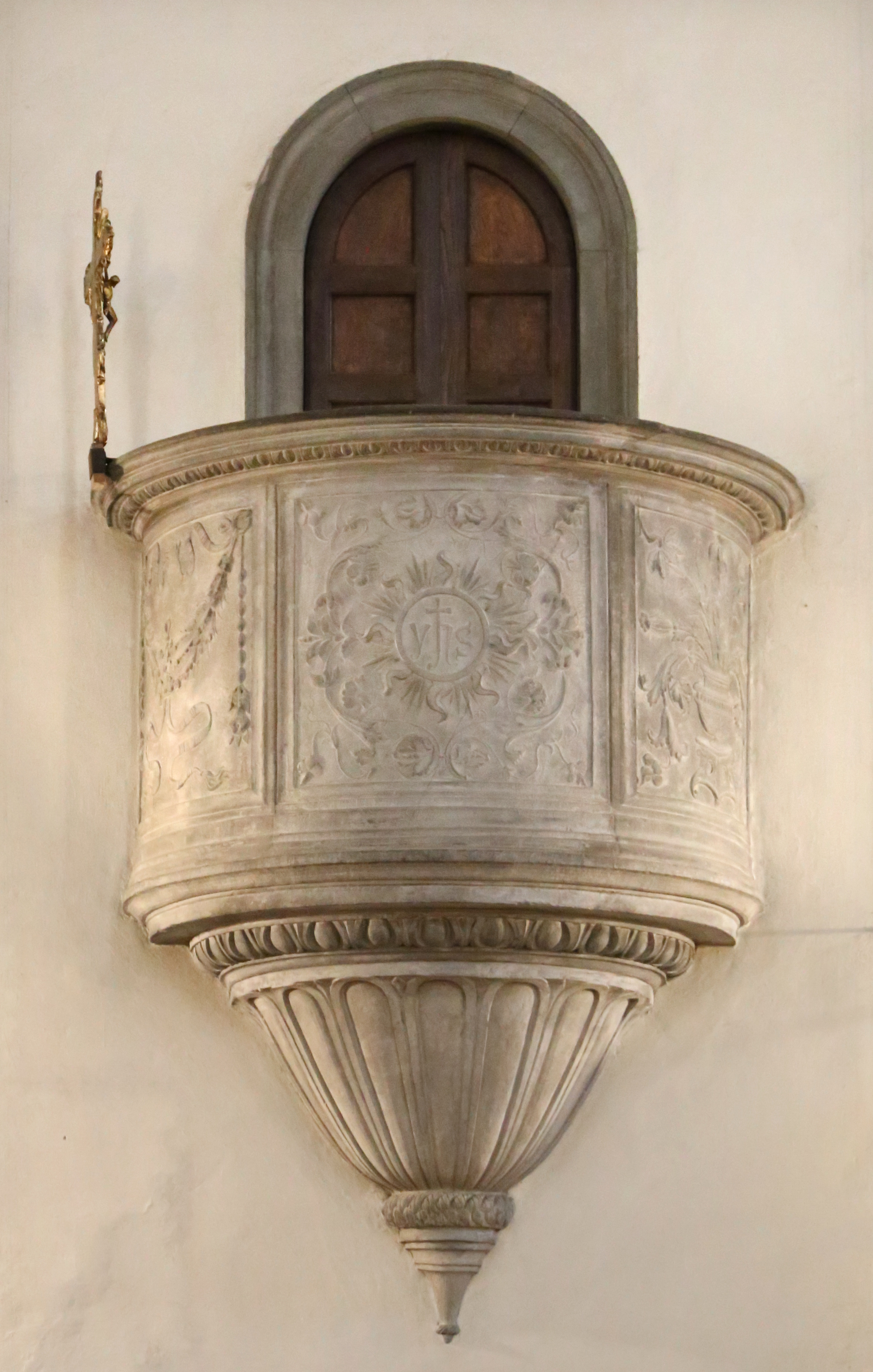
Pulpit, after Benedetto da Maiano, ca. 1490–1510

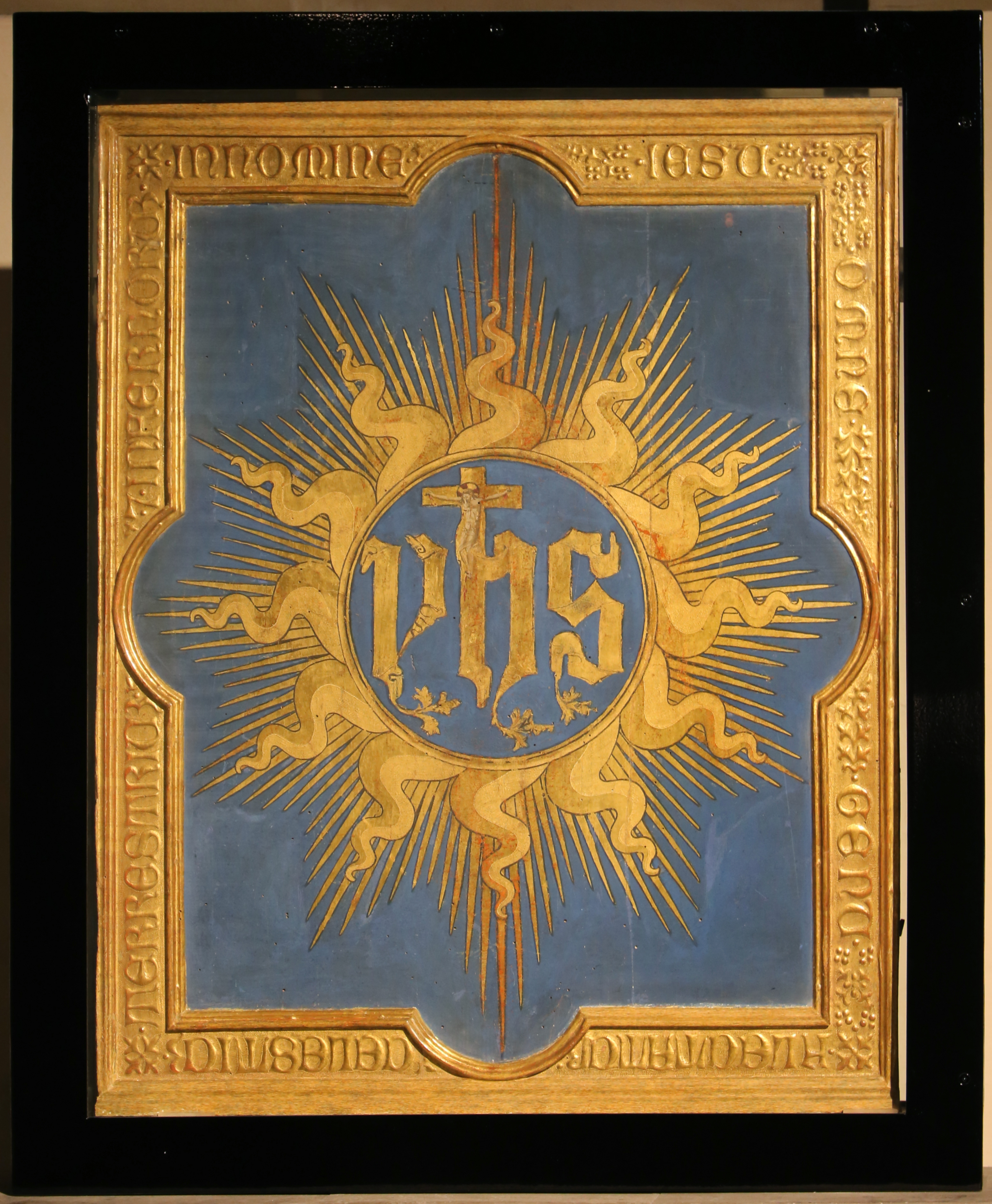
The Christogram, attributed to Neri di Bicci

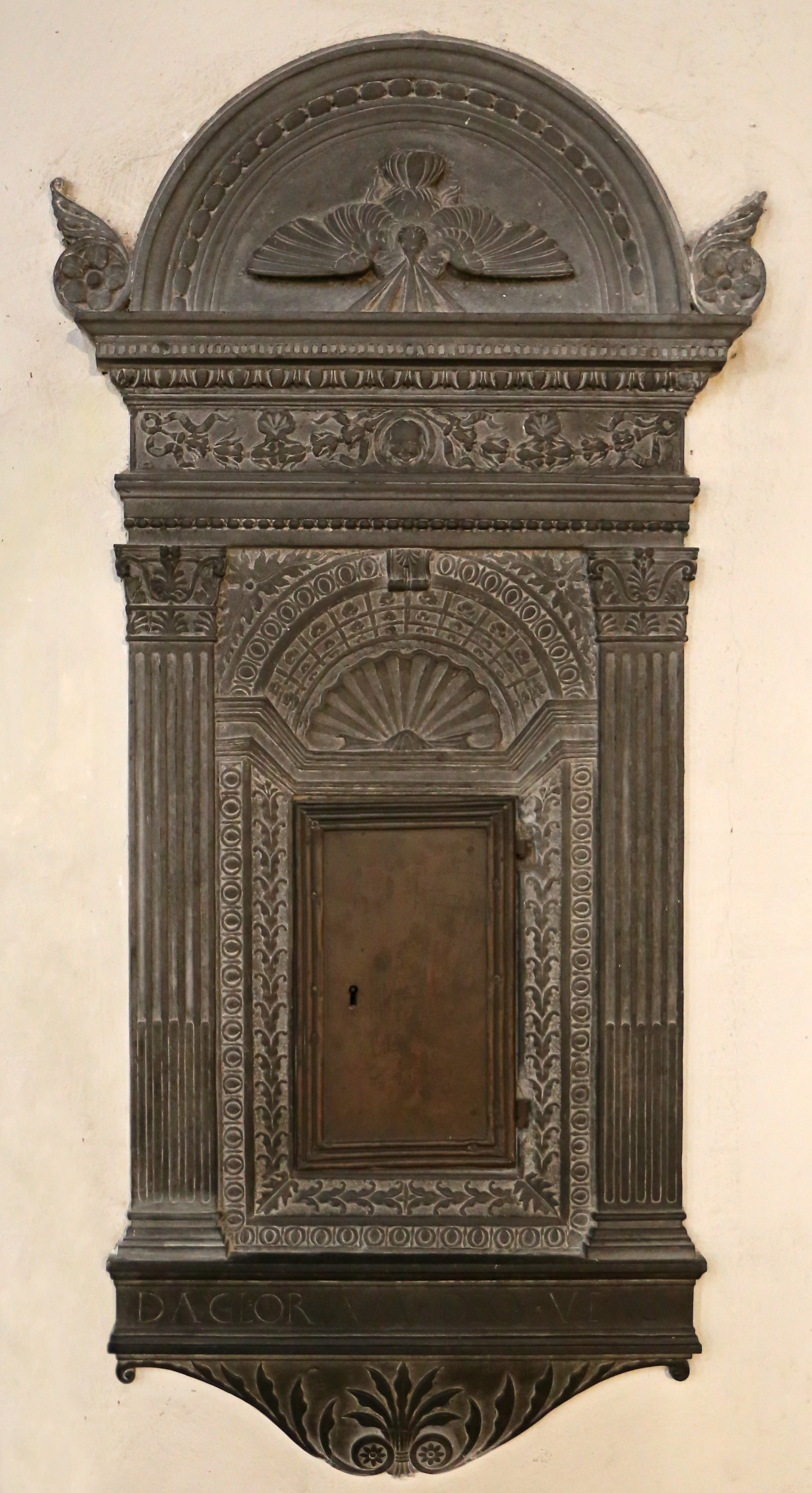
Eucharistic ciborium, ca. 1440

=== Regnadori Chapel ===
On the left of the presbytery, through a door below the choir, one enters the Capella Regnadori, protruding from the side of the church. Completed in the first half of the fourteenth century, the chapel has two bays with cross vaults. The wall to the left of the entrance is decorated with a cornice in pietra serena of the late renaissance, with an arch on fluted pilasters, with that, we can access to another chapel coeval (of employers Spighi) demolished in 1903. The wall in front of the entrance retains traces of seventeenth century frescoes; and on the semipilaster is carved the family crest of the Regnadori family (for which the chapel was named) . To the right is a lancet window and there while the neo-Gothic altar ciborium is the Same that adorn one time an altar. Side of the altar there are niches with statues: on the left a “Ecce Homo” century in colored wax.

== The cloister ==
The cloister, dating from 1438 to 1440, features Ionic columns. It has several coat of arms from the 15th to 19th century, and several frescoes: a lunette with the Madonna and Child and a tabernacle with the Madonna Enthroned and Saints from the early 14th century.

== Migliorati Chapel ==
Around 1400 the chapter (or Migliorati Chapel) was entirely frescoed by Niccolò Gerini in a style close to Giotto. The scenes include a ruined Cricifixion, the Stories of St. Matthew and Stories of St. Anthony (the latter also damaged) and, on the vault, the Evangelists.

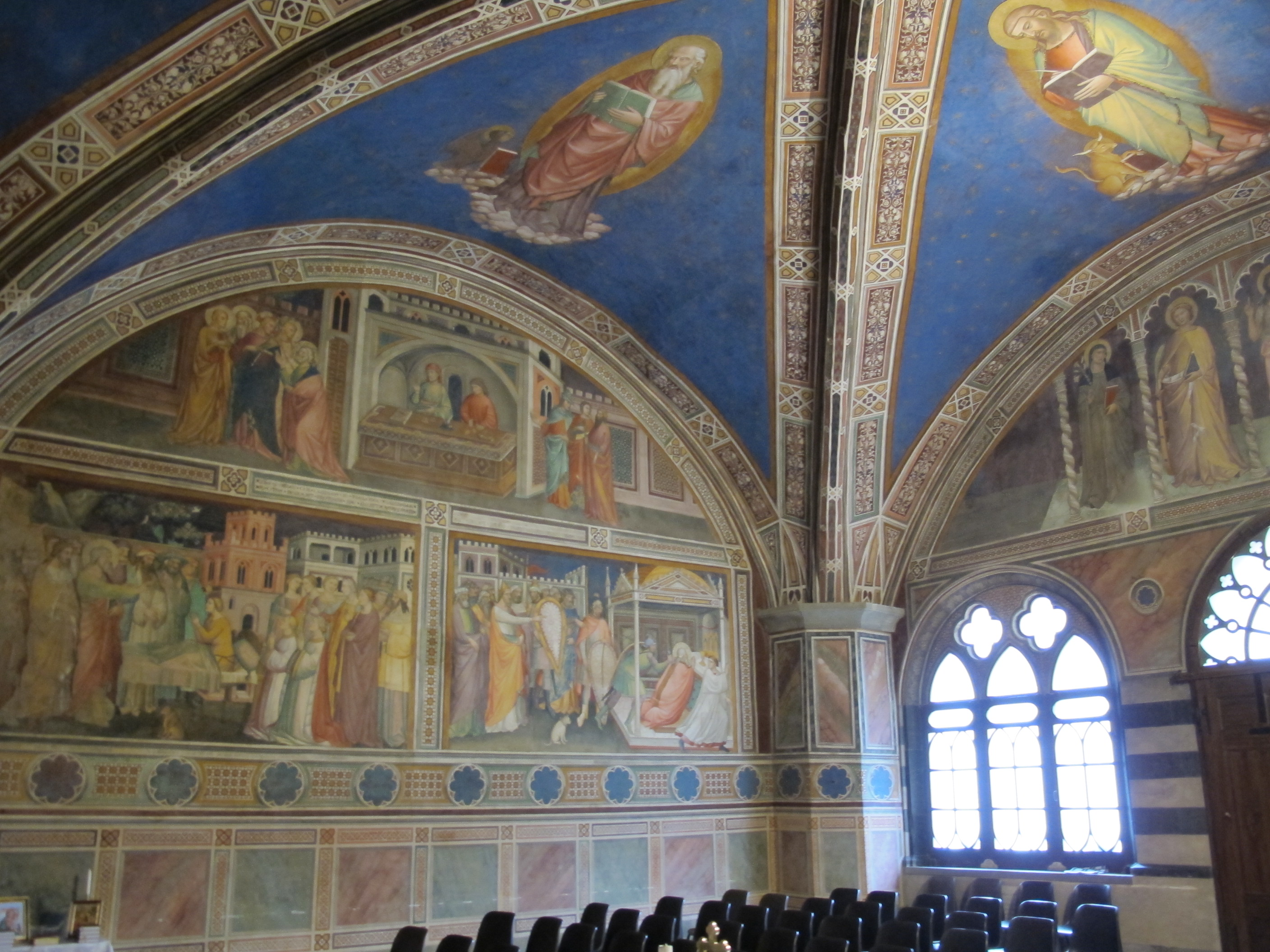
The Migliorati Chapel

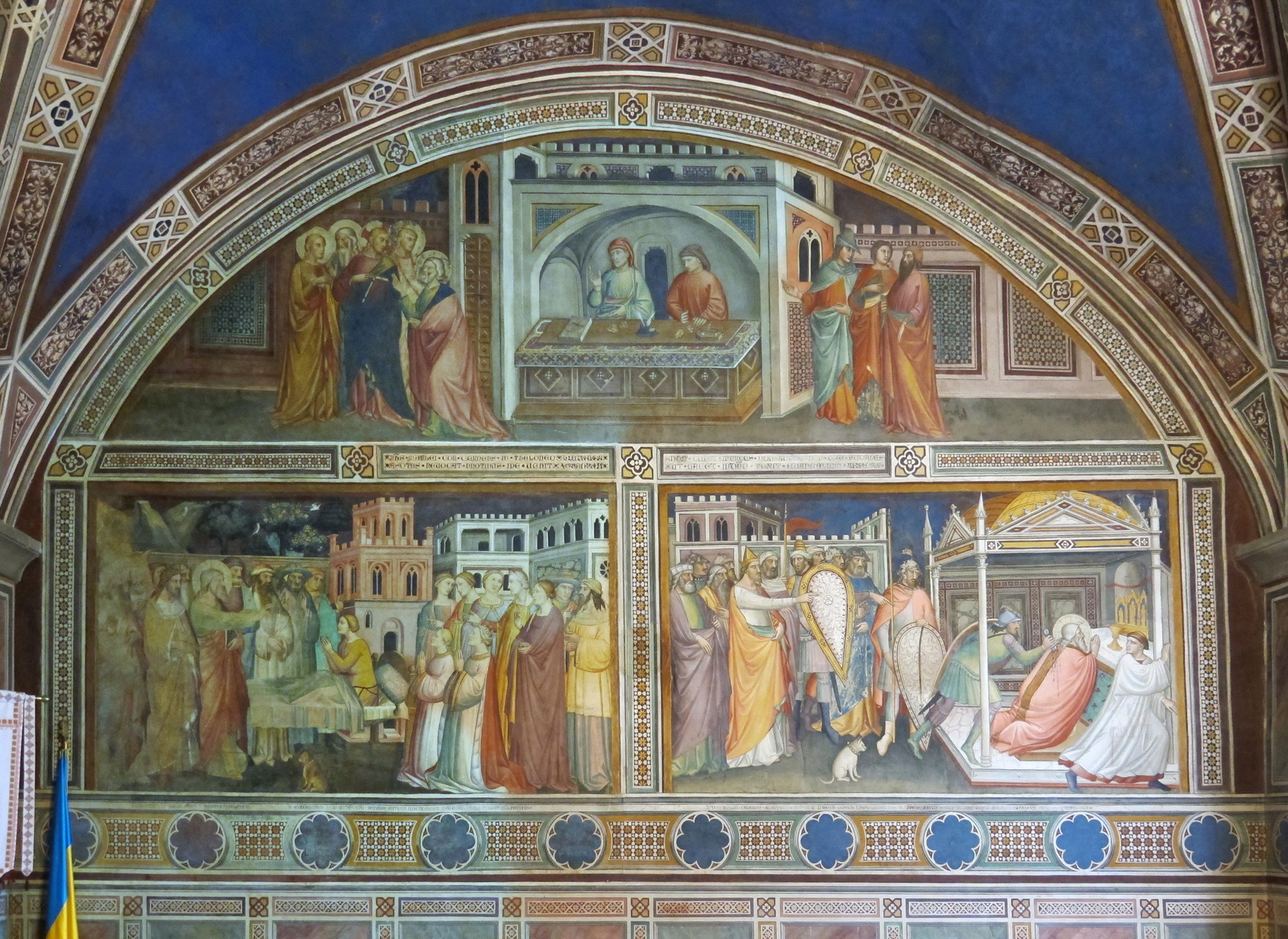
Frescoes with scenes of the life of St. Matthew
