= Francesco Datini =

Italian merchant (1335–1410)

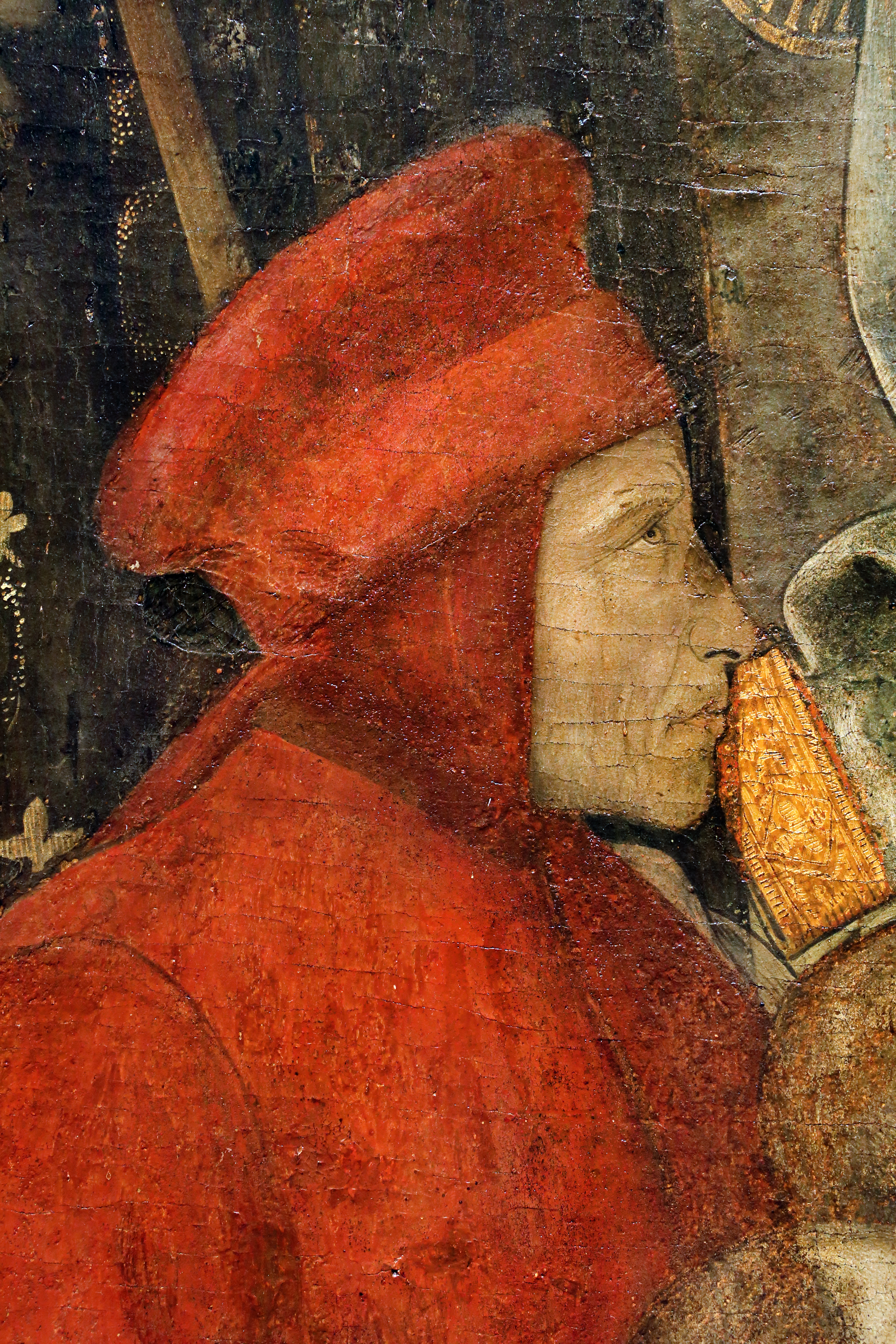
- Francesco Datini, detail of Madonna del Ceppo, 1452-1453, by Filippo Lippi, tempera on wood, 187x120
- Born: c. 1335; Prato, Republic of Florence
- Died: 16 August 1410; Prato, Republic of Florence
- Resting place: San Francesco, Prato; 43°52′45″N 11°05′49″E
- Occupation: Merchant
- Known for: having implemented the first partnership system in business
- Spouse: Margherita di Domenico Bandini (m. 1376)
- Parent(s): Marco Datini and Vermiglia Datini

Francesco di Marco Datini (c. 1335 – 16 August 1410) was an Italian merchant born in Prato. Datini is notable for having implemented the first partnership system in business in 1383.

== Biography ==
Datini was one of four children of Marco di Datino and Monna Vermiglia, who, along with two of their children, both died as a result of the Black Death in 1348.

After his parents' death, he was raised by a woman whom he called his "substitute mother." Their relationship seems to have been a positive one. There is a letter from her signed, "Your mother in love."

Datini became an apprentice of a merchant in Florence. In 1358, he joined a group of merchants who were going to Avignon, the city to which the papacy had moved at the time. Datini stayed in Avignon until 1382. His first business was in the arms trade, which was quite profitable in Avignon during the Hundred Years' War. He eventually became a supplier of luxury goods and art for the wealthy cardinals residing there. The works of art that these figures bought were some of the first consumed for private, non-religious use. Before this time, the church had been the primary patron of the arts. Later on, the papacy and other pious individuals commissioned religious artwork, creating a use for Francesco's merchant skills. He was not interested in the product itself, but rather in whether its quality would please his buyers. The purchase of artwork by individuals was a growing trend going into the Renaissance.

In 1376, Datini entered into an engagement with Margherita Bandini, the daughter of Domenico Bandini and Dianora Gheradini. Margherita was living in Avignon with her mother after her father was executed for his role in an anti-republican plot and her brothers were exiled. The couple returned to live in Prato in 1382, where Datini's business continued to thrive. In 1386, he moved to Florence, where he stayed until his death in 1410.

As thus Datini spent long periods of time away from Prato, where his wife continued to live, over the next 27 years, the couple frequently corresponded through letters. These letters give us insight into their marriage, Datini's personality and business, and Margherita's management of the household. From June 1400 to September 1401, the two, along with Datini's illegitimate daughter Ginevra, fled from Prato to Bologna in fear of the Black Death. Datini returned to die a natural death in 1410.

In 1870, 500 account books and 150,000 papers relating to Datini's business were discovered in a stairwell of the couple's mansion in Prato. These papers provide insight into both Datini's business as well as the merchant class in general as it existed in the fourteenth and fifteenth centuries.

Datini is buried in the church of San Francesco in Prato. His tomb's marble slab was designed by Niccolò di Piero Lamberti. As Datini had no legitimate or male heirs, he left the bulk of his fortune to a charitable foundation established in his name, the "Casa del Ceppo dei poveri di Francesco di Marco," which still exists today.

== See also ==
- Madonna del Ceppo, a painting by Filippo Lippi depicting him
