= Prato =

- Comune
- Comune di Prato
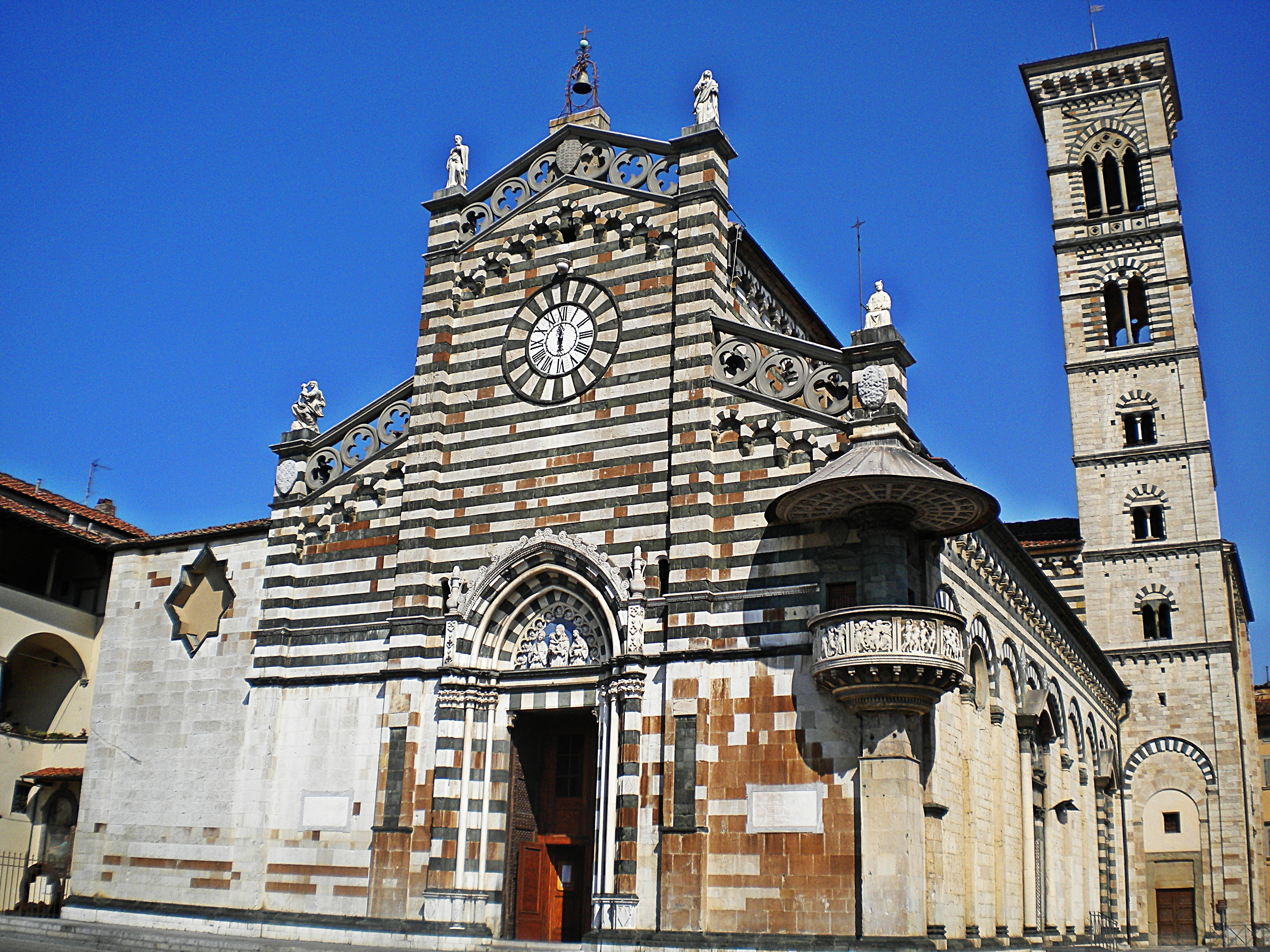
- Prato Cathedral

- Flag Coat of arms

- Location within Italy Location within Tuscany
- Coordinates: 43°52′48″N 11°05′54″E
- Country: Italy
- Region: Tuscany
- Province: Prato (PO)
- Frazioni: See list

Government
  - Mayor: Matteo Biffoni (PD)

Area
  - Total: 97.35 km^{2} (37.59 sq mi)
- Elevation: 65 m (213 ft)

Population (2026)
  - Total: 198,327
  - Density: 2,037/km^{2} (5,276/sq mi)
- Demonym: Pratese
- Time zone: UTC+1 (CET)
  - Summer (DST): UTC+2 (CEST)
- Postal code: 59100
- Dialing code: 0574
- ISTAT code: 100005
- Patron saint: St. Stephen
- Saint day: 26 December
- Website: Official website

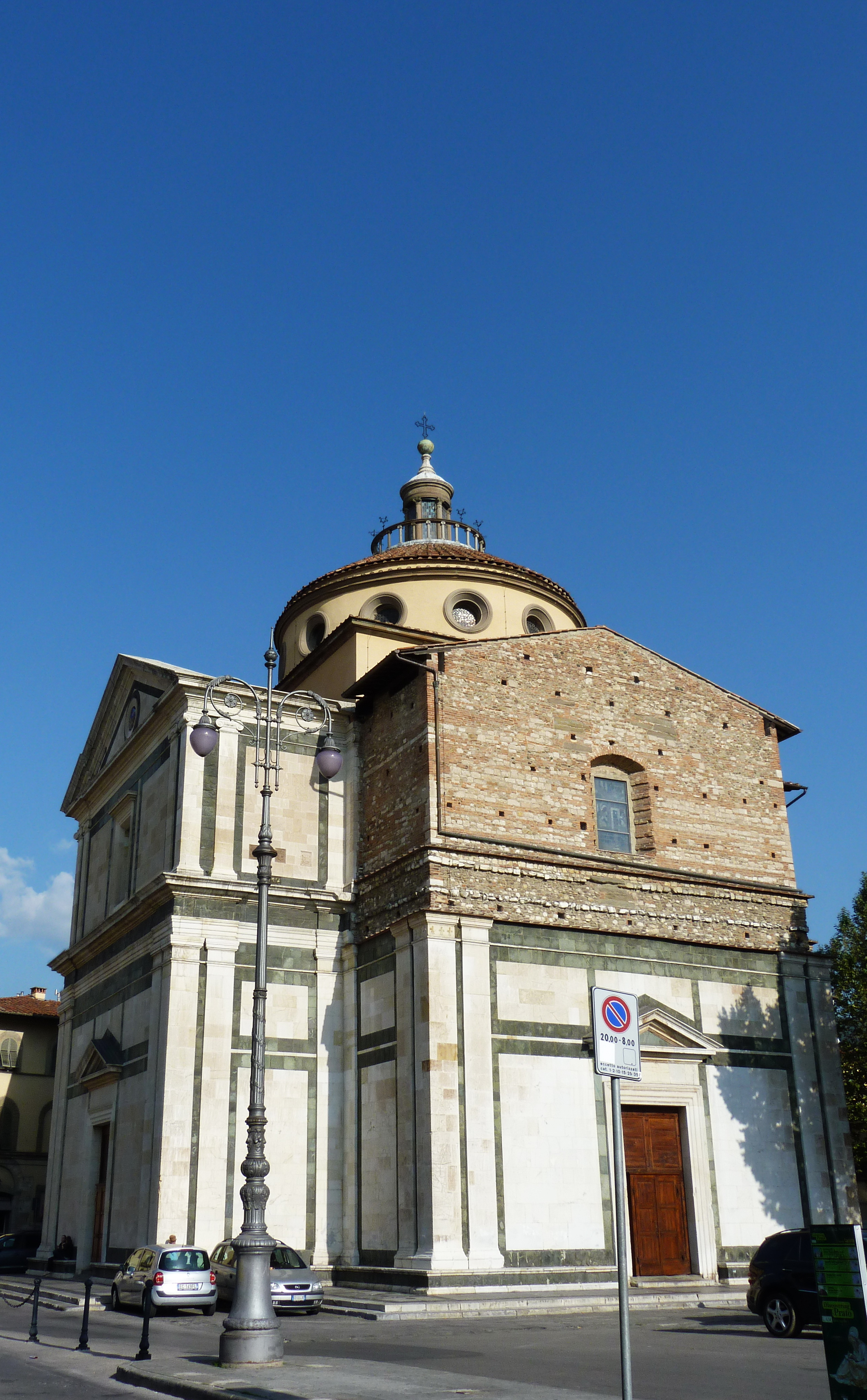
Santa Maria delle Carceri church

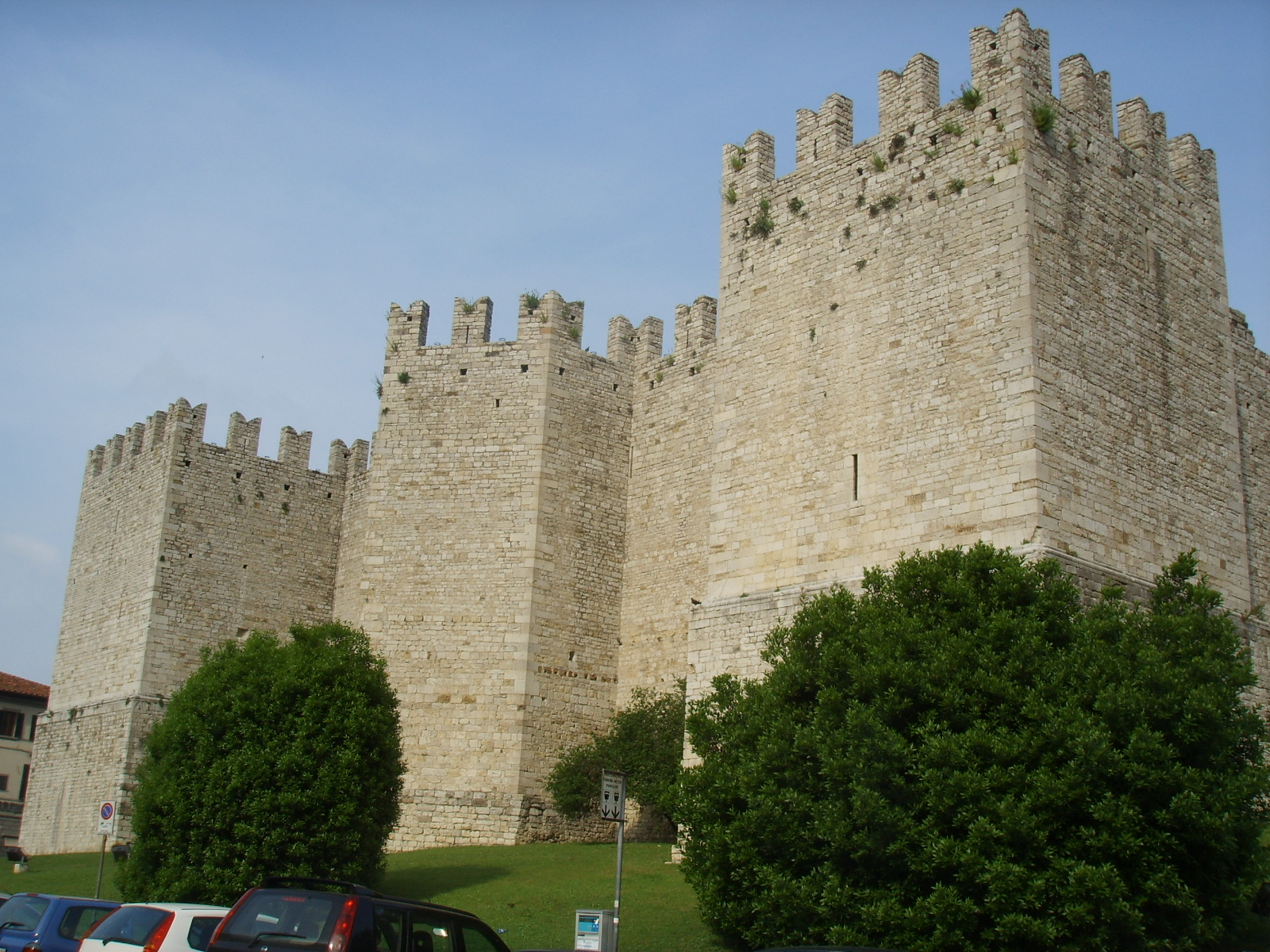
Emperor's Castle

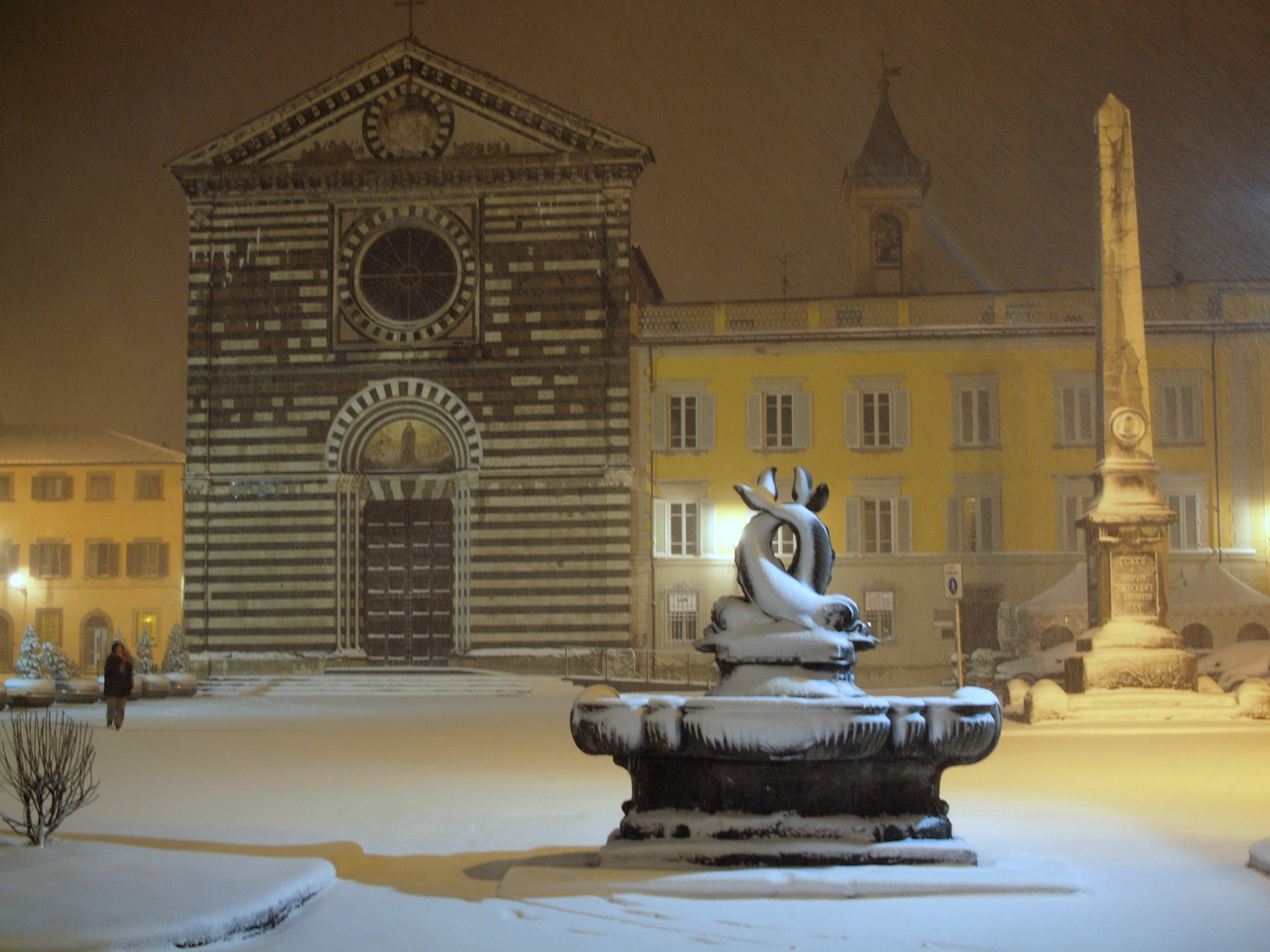
Piazza San Francesco

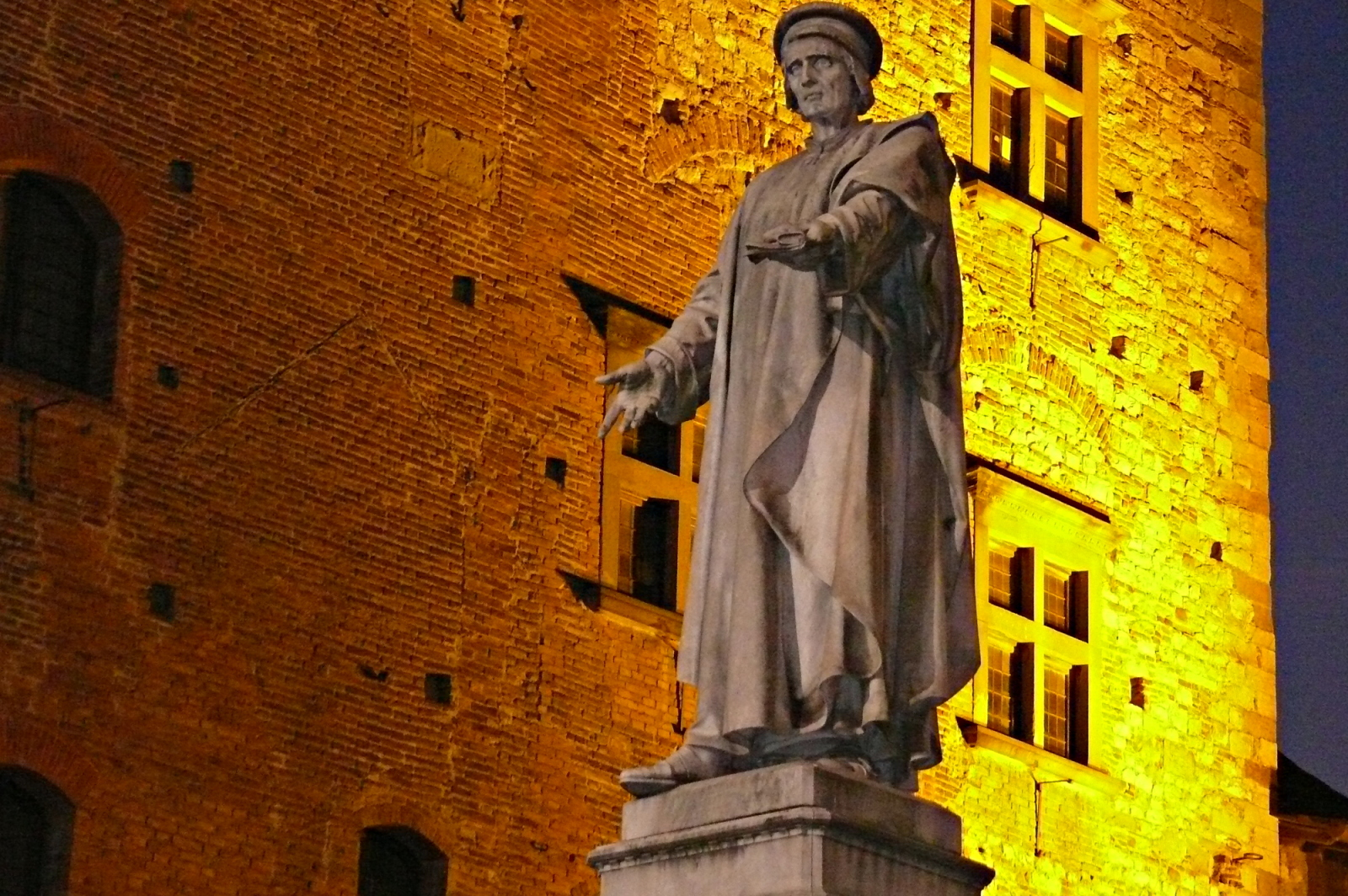
Statue of Francesco Datini in front of the Palazzo Pretorio

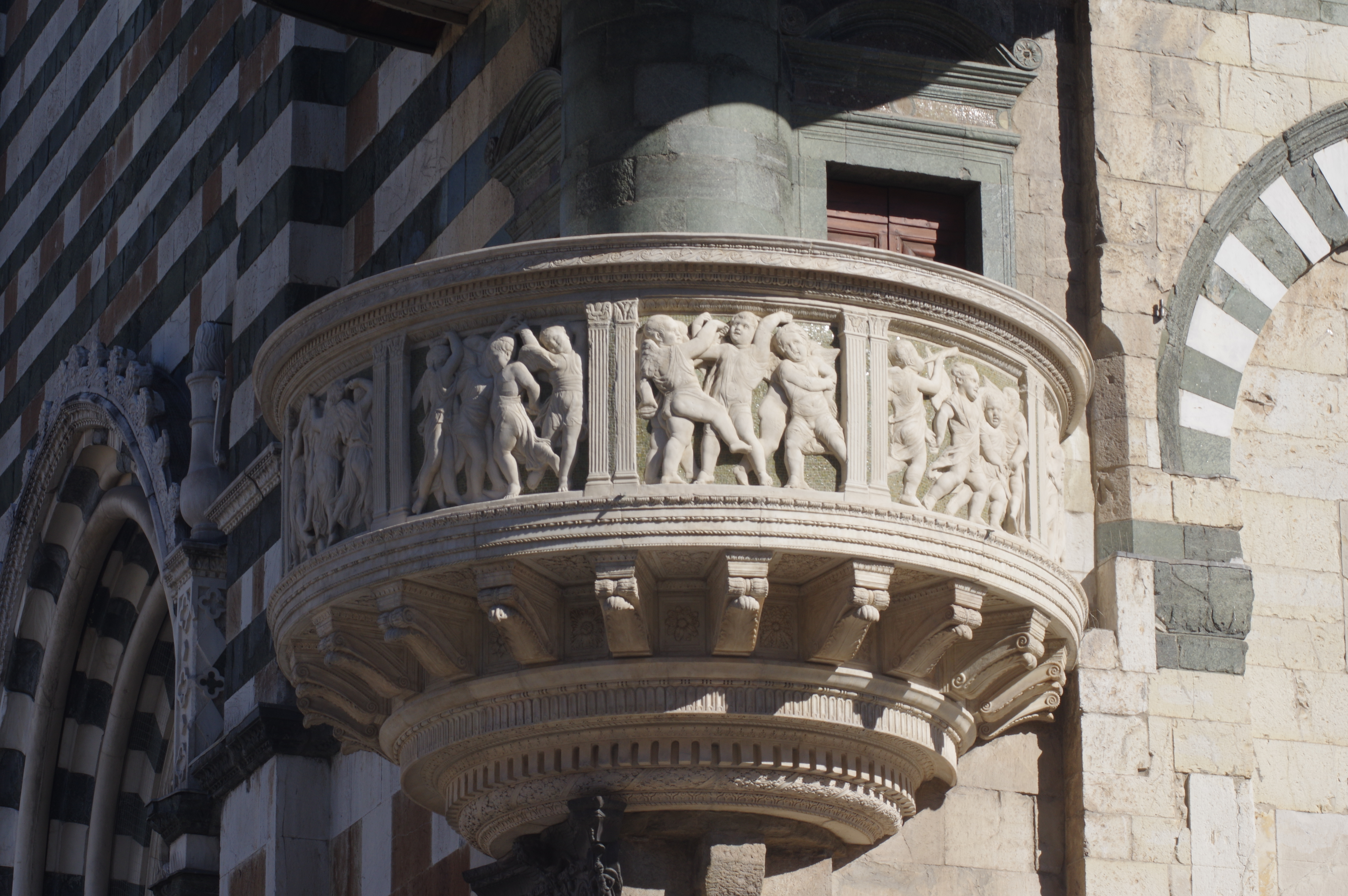
Pulpit of Donatello

Prato (/ˈprɑːtoʊ/ PRAH-toh; Italian: [ˈpraːto]) is a city and comune (municipality) in the region of Tuscany in Italy, and is the capital of the Province of Prato. The city lies in the northeast of Tuscany, at an elevation of 65 metres (213 ft), at the foot of Monte Retaia (the last peak in the Calvana chain). The distance between Prato and Florence is approximately 15–17 kilometers (about 9–10 miles). With a population of 198,327 as of 2026, Prato is Tuscany's 2nd-largest city after Florence, and the 18th-largest in Italy.

Historically, Prato's economy has been based on the textile industry which has continued in recent years leading to it becoming Italy's fast fashion manufacturing hub. The city's textile district, the largest in Europe, is home to about 5000 fashion companies which are largely small, Chinese-run subcontractors engaging in illegal activity known as the "Prato system" run by Chinese organized crime. The left wing Partito Democratico (PD) has been implicated in the crimes with the PD mayor Ilaria Bugetti resigning after the opening of a corruption investigation against her in July 2025.

The city boasts important historical and artistic attractions, with a cultural span that started with the Etruscans and then expanded in the Middle Ages and reached its peak with the Renaissance, when artists such as Donatello, Filippo Lippi and Botticelli left their testimonies in the city. The renowned Datini archives are a significant collection of late medieval documents concerning economic and trade history, produced between 1363 and 1410.

Cantucci, a type of biscotti invented in Prato during the Middle Ages, are still produced by local traditional bakers.

== History ==
=== Ancient times ===
Archaeological findings have proved that Prato's surrounding hills were inhabited since Paleolithic times. The plain was later colonized by the Etruscans. In 1997, remains of a previously unknown city from that civilization were discovered in the neighbourhood of Gonfienti near Campi Bisenzio. It was of medium size and it was already a centre for the wool and textile industry. According to some scholars, it could be the mythical Camars. The Etruscan city was inhabited until the 5th century BC, when, for undisclosed reasons, it decayed; control of the area later shifted to the Romans, who routed the Via Cassia through it but did not build any settlements.

=== Middle Ages ===
In the early Middle Ages, the Byzantine and Lombard dominations prevailed in the region.

The history of Prato itself begins from the 10th century, when two distinct villages, Borgo al Cornio and Castrum Prati (Prato's Castle), are known. In the following century the two settlements were united under the lords of the castle, the Alberti family, who received the imperial title of Counts of Prato. In the same period the plain was drained and a hydraulic system regulating and exploiting the waters of the Bisenzio River was created to feed the gualchiere (pre-industrial textile machines).

After a siege in 1107 by the troops of Matilde of Canossa, the Alberti retreated to their family fortresses in the Bisenzio Valley: Prato could therefore develop as a free commune. Within two centuries it reached 15,000 inhabitants, spurred in by the flourishing textile industry and by the presence of the Holy Belt relic. Two new lines of walls had to be built in the mid-12th century, and in the early 14th century.

In 1313, in order to counter the expansionism of the Republic of Florence, Prato submitted voluntarily under the seigniory of Robert of Anjou, King of Naples. However, on 23 February 1351 Joanna I of Naples sold the city to the Republic of Florence in exchange for 17,500 golden florins.

Prato's history therefore followed that of Florence in the following centuries.

=== Modern age ===
In 1512, during the War of the Holy League, the city was sacked by Spanish troops assembled by Pope Julius II and the king of Aragón, Ferdinand II, to recover the nearby city of Florence for the Medici family. The severity of the sack of Prato led to the surrender of the Florentine Republic, and to the restoration of the Medici rule. Historians debate the actual number of people killed during the sack, but contemporary chroniclers asserted between 2000 and 6000 people were slaughtered in the streets. Following the 1512 fall of Prato, the ambassador from the Duchy of Ferrara documented the scene, reporting that Spanish forces executed an unprecedented massacre, leaving churches and homes filled with corpses.

In 1653, Prato obtained the status of city and became seat of a Catholic diocese. During the 18th century, with the ascent of Lorraine at the head of the Grand Duchy of Tuscany, the city was embellished and also experienced a significant cultural development, which was promoted by the grand dukes themselves.

The intellectual foresight of Prato and its land in this century finds its maximum expression in the words of Filippo Mazzei, a friend of Thomas Jefferson, which today are reported in the second paragraph of the American Declaration of Independence: All men are created equal.

After the unification of Italy in the 19th century, Prato became a primary industrial centre, especially in the textile sector (Italian historian Emanuele Repetti described it as the "Italian Manchester"), and its population grew up to 50,000 in 1901 and to 180,000 in 2001. The town experienced significant internal immigration. Previously part of the province of Florence, in 1992 Prato became the capital of the eponymous province.

== Climate ==
Prato has a humid subtropical climate which has sunny hot summers and cool damp winters. July is the driest month of the year.

== Demographics ==
Historical population
Year	Pop.	±%
1861	32,710	—
1871	36,923	+12.9%
1881	38,985	+5.6%
1901	47,166	+21.0%
1911	51,707	+9.6%
1921	55,021	+6.4%
1931	61,498	+11.8%
1936	64,362	+4.7%
1951	77,631	+20.6%
1961	111,285	+43.4%
1971	143,232	+28.7%
1981	160,220	+11.9%
1991	165,707	+3.4%
2001	172,499	+4.1%
2011	185,456	+7.5%
2021	195,213	+5.3%
Source: ISTAT

As of 2026, the population is 198,327, of which 49.5% are male, and 50.5% are female. Minors make up 14.6% of the population, and seniors make up 22.7%.

=== Immigration ===
As of 2025, immigrants make up 24.3% of the total population. The 5 largest foreign countries of birth are China, Albania, Pakistan, Romania, and Morocco.

==== Chinese immigration ====
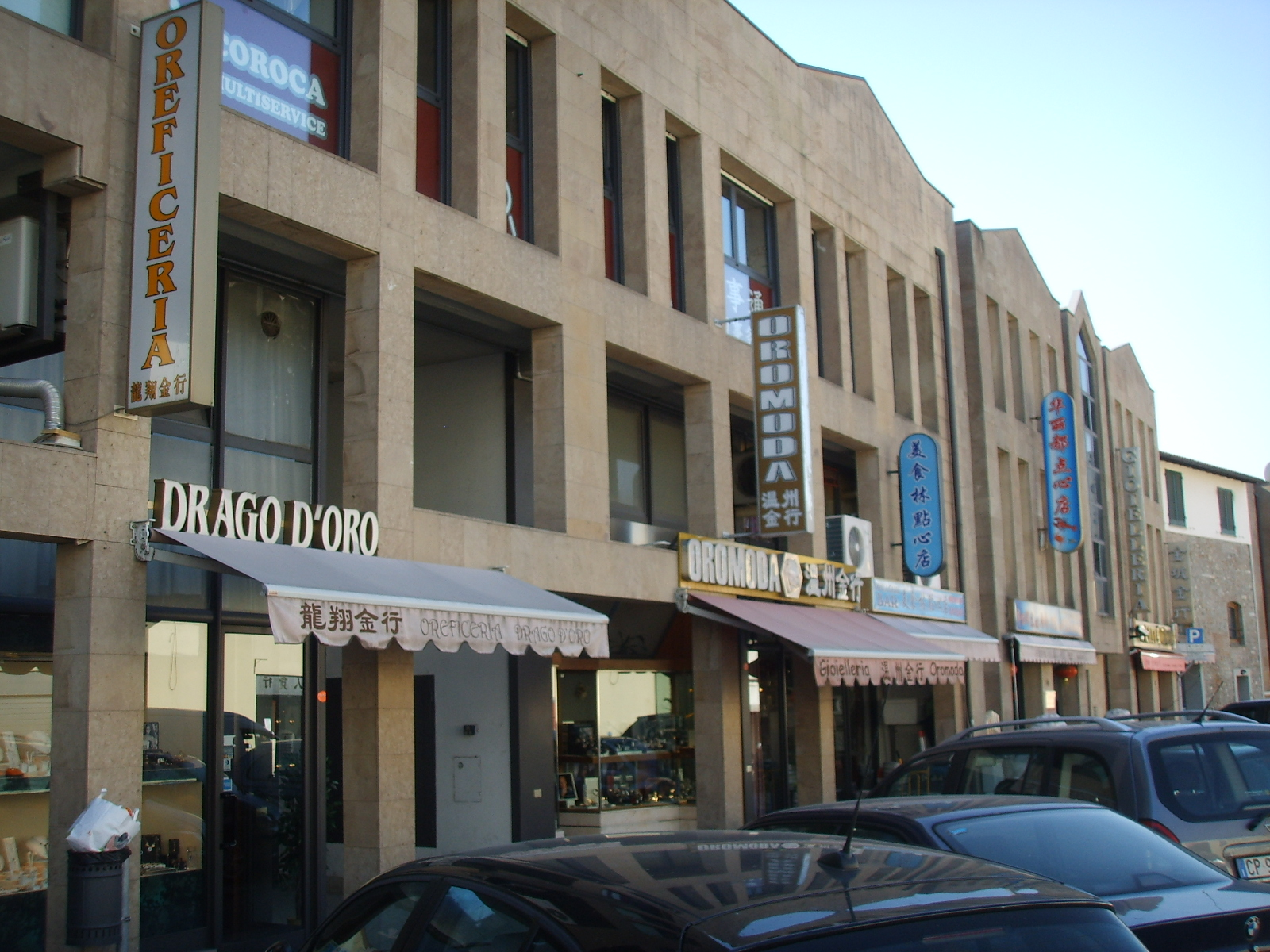
Chinese shops

The city of Prato has the second largest Chinese immigrant population in Italy (after Milan with Italy's largest Chinatown). The number of legal Chinese residents in Prato on 31 December 2008 was 9,927; the number rose to 27,829 on 31 December 2021. Local authorities estimate the overall number of Chinese citizens living in Prato to be as high as 50,000, illegal immigrants included, although such number may be inflated for political reasons. Most overseas Chinese come from the city of Wenzhou in the province of Zhejiang, some of them having moved from Chinatown in Paris. The first Chinese people came to Prato in the early 1990s. The majority of Chinese work in 3,500 workshops in the garment industry and ready-to-wear. Chinatown, known as Santo Beijing, is located in the west part of the city, spreading to Porta Pistoiese in the historical centre. The local Chamber of Commerce registered over 3,100 Chinese businesses by September 2008. Most of them are located in an industrial park named Macrolotto di Iolo. Raids on factories employing illegal immigrants in 2010 highlighted problems with the growth of an apparel industry in Prato based on cheap, and sometimes illegal, labor. In spite of these claims, the local unemployment rate was around 7% in 2013, which was significantly lower than the national average of 11%, even after 4,000 enterprises which had employed 20,000 people were closed in the previous two decades. The president of the Industrial Association of Prato, Andrea Cavicchi, pointed out that the local economic performance was much better than the rest of Italy due to the Chinese textile firms. The Chinese community was represented in local institutions after 2019 elections, when two city councillors of Chinese origins were elected.

=== Dialect ===
The dialect from Prato is very similar to that of Florence, but it has its own peculiarities. The pronunciation of the city name in the dialect was traditionally [ˈpraː.o] but now [ˈpraːho] or [ˈpraːθo] are more common.

== Government ==
=== Administrative subdivisions ===
The municipal territory is divided into five administrative districts: North, East, South, West and Centre.:

- Circoscrizione North: Cavagliano, Cerreto, Chiesanuova, Coiano, Figline di Prato, Galcetello, Galceti, Gli Abatoni, I Bifolchi, I Ciliani, La Torricella, Le Fornaci, Le Lastre, Le Sacca, San Martino, Santa Lucia, Villa Fiorita
- Circoscrizione Sud: Cafaggio, Casale, Castelnuovo, Campostino, Fontanelle, Grignano, Il Ferro, Prato, Le Badie, Le Caserane, Le Colombaie, Le Fonti, Paperino, Ponte alle Vanne, Ponte a Tigliano, Popolino, Purgatorio, San Giorgio a Colonica, San Giusto, Sant'Andrea, Santa Maria a Colonica, Tavola, Tobbiana
- Circoscrizione Est: Canneto, Carteano, Cavagliano, Filettole, Gonfienti, I Lecci, Il Cantiere, Il Palco, La Castellina, La Macine, La Pietà, La Querce, Mezzana, Pizzidimonte, Sacra Famiglia, Santa Cristina a Pimonte, Santa Gonda, Tontoli
- Circoscrizione Ovest: Borgonuovo, Capezzana, Galciana, Il Calice, Il Guado, La Dogaia, Le Pantanelle, Maliseti, Mazzone, Narnali, San Paolo, Sant'Ippolito, Vergaio, Viaccia
- Circoscrizione Centro: Centro Direzionale, Il Pino, Soccorso, Reggiana - Gescal

== Culture ==
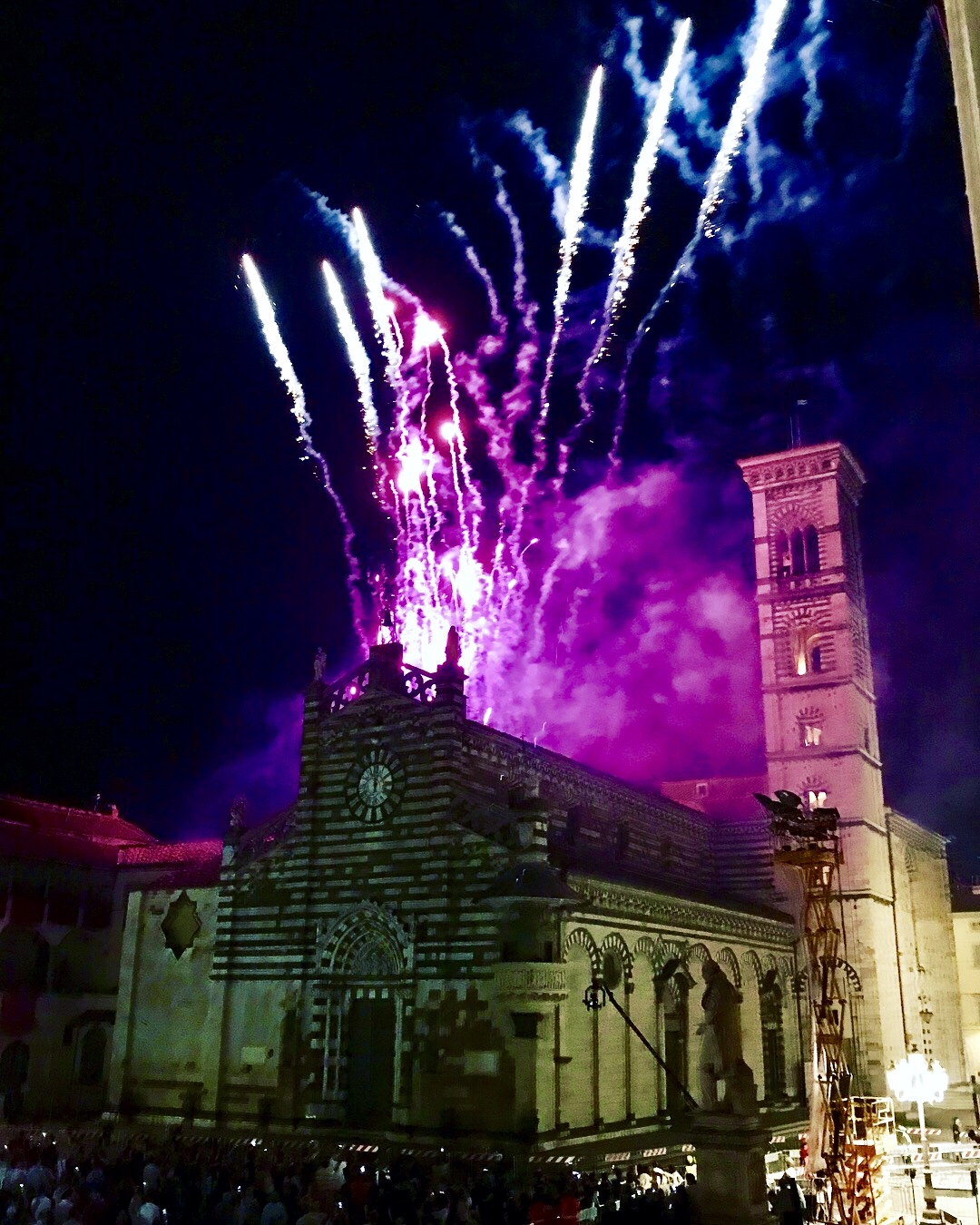
Fireworks on Piazza del Duomo during the Corteggio Storico

=== Corteggio Storico ===
On 8 September each year, to pay homage to the Sacra Cintola, on the day of the birth of the Madonna, there is the Corteggio Storico. The costume parade takes place along the streets of the center, in which the armies of the city, the Corpo dei Valletti Comunali and other hundreds of people from different cities of Italy take part. The procession ends in Piazza del Duomo, where there is the most solemn event of the day: the exposition of the relic of the Holy Girdle.

The program of the festival is enriched by various performances that are held throughout the day in various points of the historic center, such as, for example, the performance of flag-wavers, shooting with bows, the medieval market with re-enactments of ancient crafts and traditions, musical performances, fireworks.

=== Chinese New Year ===
The local Chinese associations in Prato organize the New Year's celebrations that follow the Lunar calendar. The last day of festivities have a parade with several puppets of dragons and lions, manipulated by experienced dancers and martial artists who perform the traditional Dragon dance.

=== Palla Grossa ===
The Game of Palla Grossa is back to be played in Prato Piazza Mercatale in September 2012, after almost thirty years of absence. Four districts compete: the Rossi (Santa Trinita), the Gialli (Santo Stefano), the Azzurri (Santa Maria) and the Verdi (San Marco).

=== Contemporary festival ===
The contemporanea festival is an international theater festival that takes place in Prato since 1999. The event takes place at the end of May and presents important artists of the national and international contemporary theater scene.

=== Typical cuisine ===
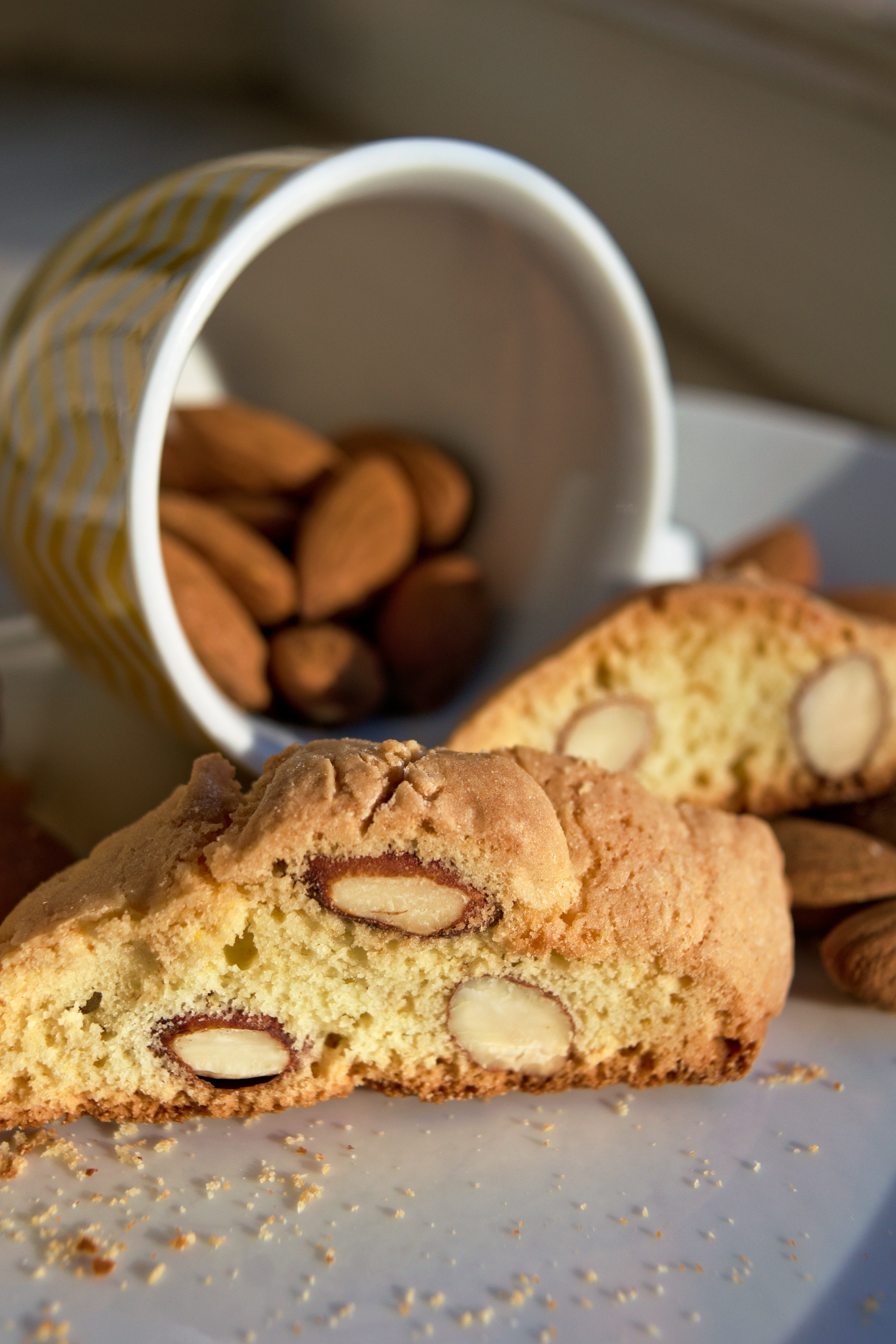
Cantucci di Prato

The typical Pratese cuisine, as in general that of the whole Tuscany, uses "poor" products and ingredients, mainly from the territory. The bread, called bozza pratese, is definitely the basic element of the kitchen. In Prato, as in Florence it is customary to use bread to prepare croutons with the livers, panzanella and pappa al pomodoro.

Piatti tipici

- Cantucci
- Bruttiboni
- Sedani ripieni alla pratese
- Mortadella di Prato
- Ribollita
- Torta mantovana
- Pesche di Prato
- Vermouth di Prato
- Zuccherini
- Bozza pratese

== Sights ==
Prato is home to many museums and other cultural monuments, including the Filippo Lippi frescoes in the Cathedral of Santo Stefano, recently restored. The cathedral has an external pulpit by Donatello and Michelozzo, built and still used for the display of the cathedral's famous relic of the Virgin Mary, the Girdle of Thomas (Sacra Cintola, a cord belt), which had a great reputation in the late Middle Ages and is often shown in Florentine art. Also of interest is the Teatro Metastasio, the city's main venue for operas and other theatrical productions, which was built in 1829–30.

=== Palazzi and castles in the historical center ===
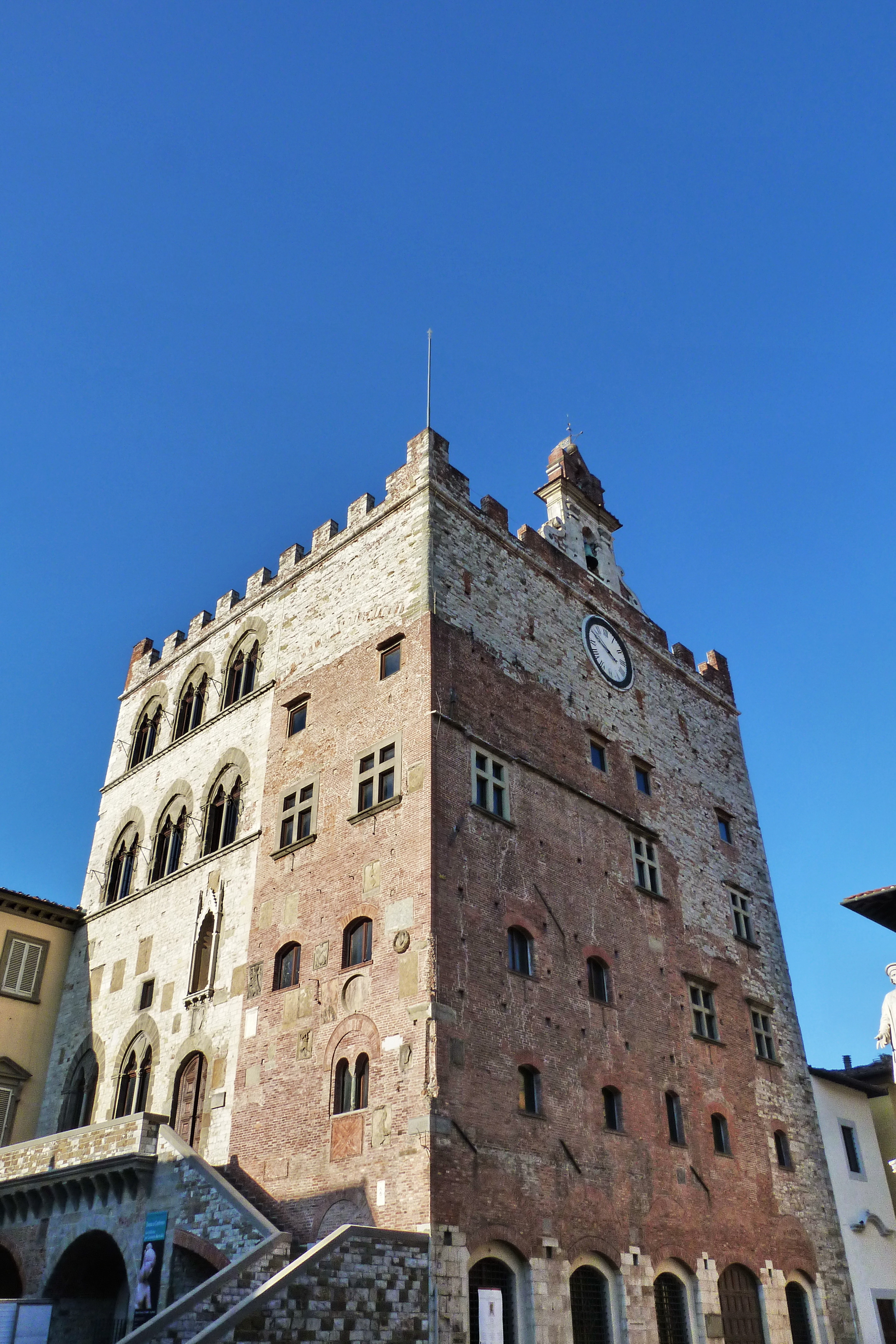
Palazzo Pretorio

Palazzo Pretorio
The palace was begun in the 13th century in red bricks; late-Gothic style additions were in white stone. The external staircase and clock were added in the 16th century and later.
Palazzo Datini
Built from 1383 for the merchant Francesco Datini. It was decorated by Florentine artists like Agnolo Gaddi and Niccolò Gerini. In 1409 it housed Pope Alexander V and Louis of Anjou.
Palazzo degli Alberti
(13th Century), housing a museum with works by Filippo Lippi (Madonna del Ceppo), Giovanni Bellini (Crucifix with Jew Cemetery) and Caravaggio (The Crowning with Thorns).
Castello dell'Imperatore
Located in the city center, this is the northernmost castle built by Frederick II of Hohenstaufen in Italy.

=== Main churches in the historical center ===
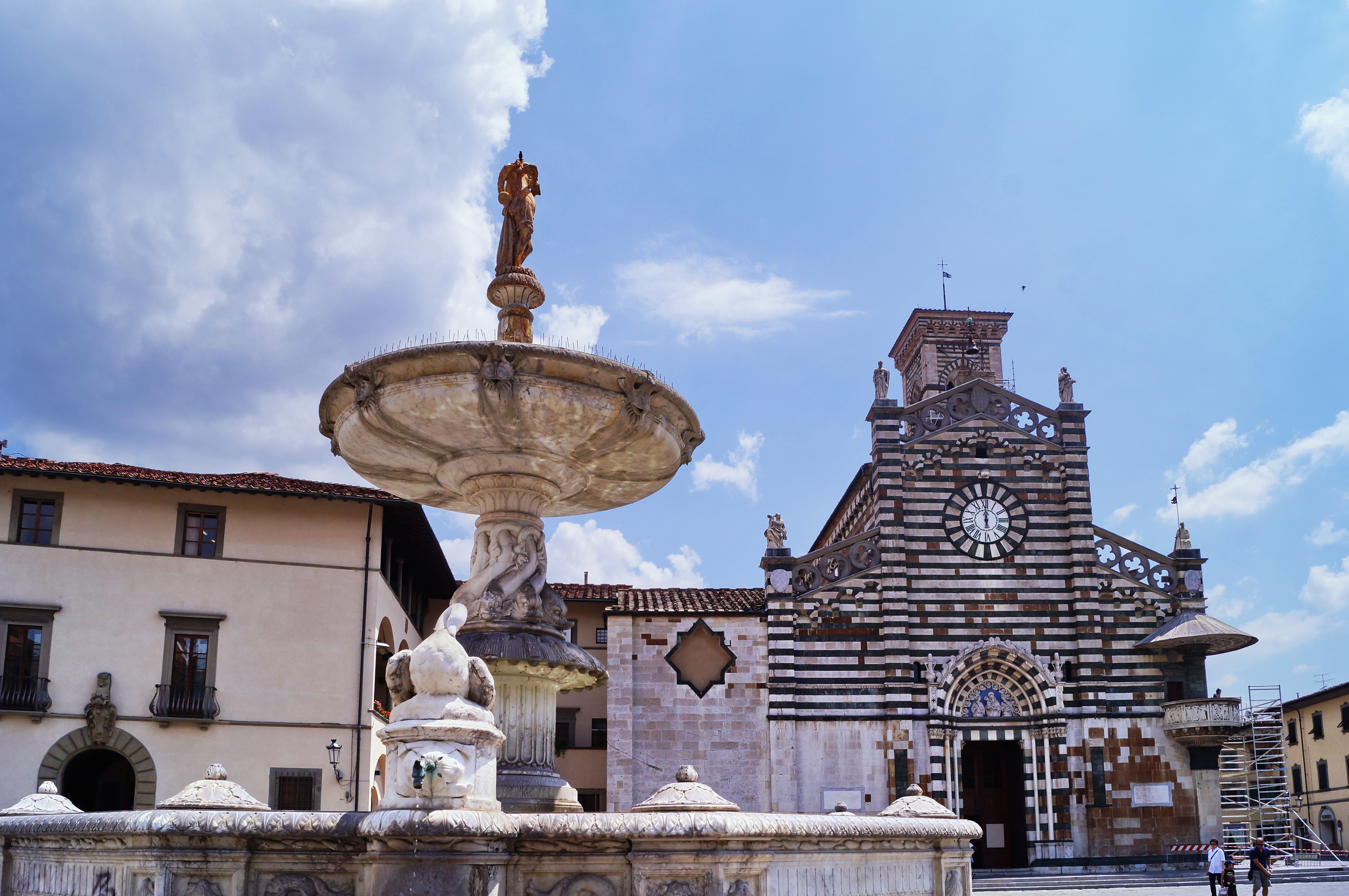
Piazza Duomo

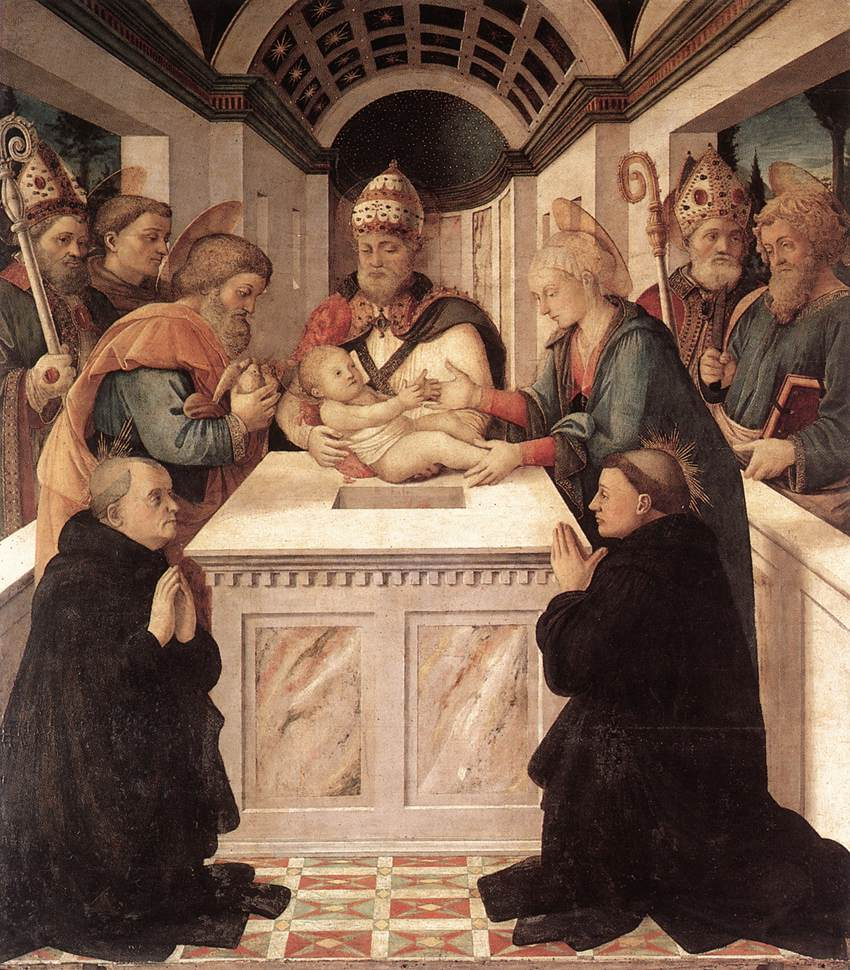
Filippo Lippi and workshop, Presentation at the Temple, in Santo Spirito

Prato Cathedral
One of the most ancient churches in the city, already in existence in the 10th century. It was built in several successive stages in the Romanesque style. The church contains a number of notable works of art, in particular fine sculpture.
Santa Maria delle Carceri
Commissioned by Lorenzo de' Medici to Giuliano da Sangallo in 1484. It is on a Greek cross plan, inspired by Brunelleschi's Pazzi Chapel. Works lasted for some twenty years. The interior is run by a bichromatic maiolica frieze by Luca della Robbia, also author of four tondos depicting the four Evangelists in the cupola. The external façade is unfinished, only the western part being completed in the 19th century according to Sangallo's design.
Sant'Agostino
built from 1440 over an existing edifice from 1271. It has a simple façade with a rose window and a bell tower with pyramidal top. The interior is on the basilica plan, with a nave and two aisles divided by brickwork columns having "waterleave" capitals (c. 1410). The apse chapels date to the late 14th century. The interior is home to canvasses by Giovanni Battista Naldini, Lorenzo Lippi, l'Empoli, Giovanni Bizzelli and others, as well as 14th-century frescoes. The cloister dates to the 16th century.
San Domenico
The interior altars house a crucifix of the 14th century and an Annunciation by Matteo Rosselli (1578–1650). The cloister of the adjacent convent was built in 1478–80. An adjacent museum has works of wall frescoes.
San Francesco
It houses a funerary monument of Geminiano Inghirami (died 1460), and the frescoes by Niccolò Gerini in the wonderful Cappella Migliorati.
San Fabiano
Already existing in 1082. It houses precious traces of a pavement mosaic dating from the 9th–11th centuries. Also notable is the 15th-century bell tower.
Minor Basilica of Santi Vicenzo e Caterina de' Ricci
Adjacent to the late-Baroque monastery of San Vicenzo. The church was decorated for the canonization of the Saint Catherine of Ricci, who was associated with the monastery and is buried in the church.

=== Main museums ===
Palazzo Pretorio
It was the old city hall located town center, standing in front of the current Palazzo Comunale. It now accommodates the Civic Museum of Prato, which was reopened in September 2013.
Prato Cathedral Museum
It was founded in 1967 in a few rooms of the Bishop's residence and in 1976 grew to include items from both the Cathedral of Saint Stephen and the diocesan territory.

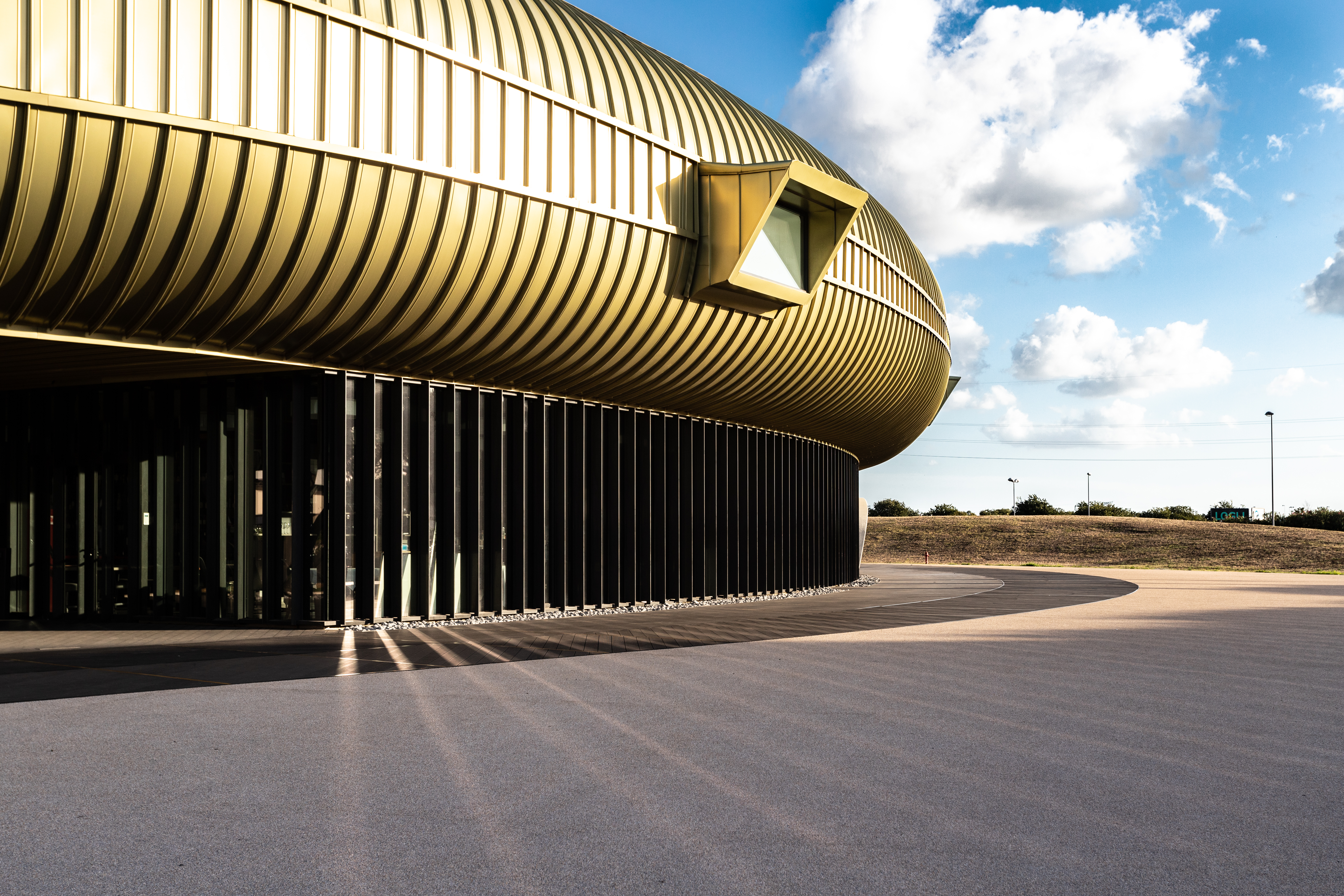
Contemporary Art Museum

Centro per l'arte contemporanea Luigi Pecci
Devoted to the contemporary arts of the last three decades. The complex composes the Museum of Contemporary Art, the Centre of Information and Documentation, including the visual arts, and an education department.
Prato textile museum
The museum and library is an Anchor point on the European Route of Industrial Heritage.
Galleria di Palazzo degli Alberti
Home to the art gallery of the local bank (former Cassa di Risparmio di Prato). Works of the collection include The Crowning with Thorns, by Caravaggio (c. 1604).
Museo della Deportazione
Dedicated to the memory of the victims of Nazi concentration and extermination camps.

== Transport ==
=== Train ===
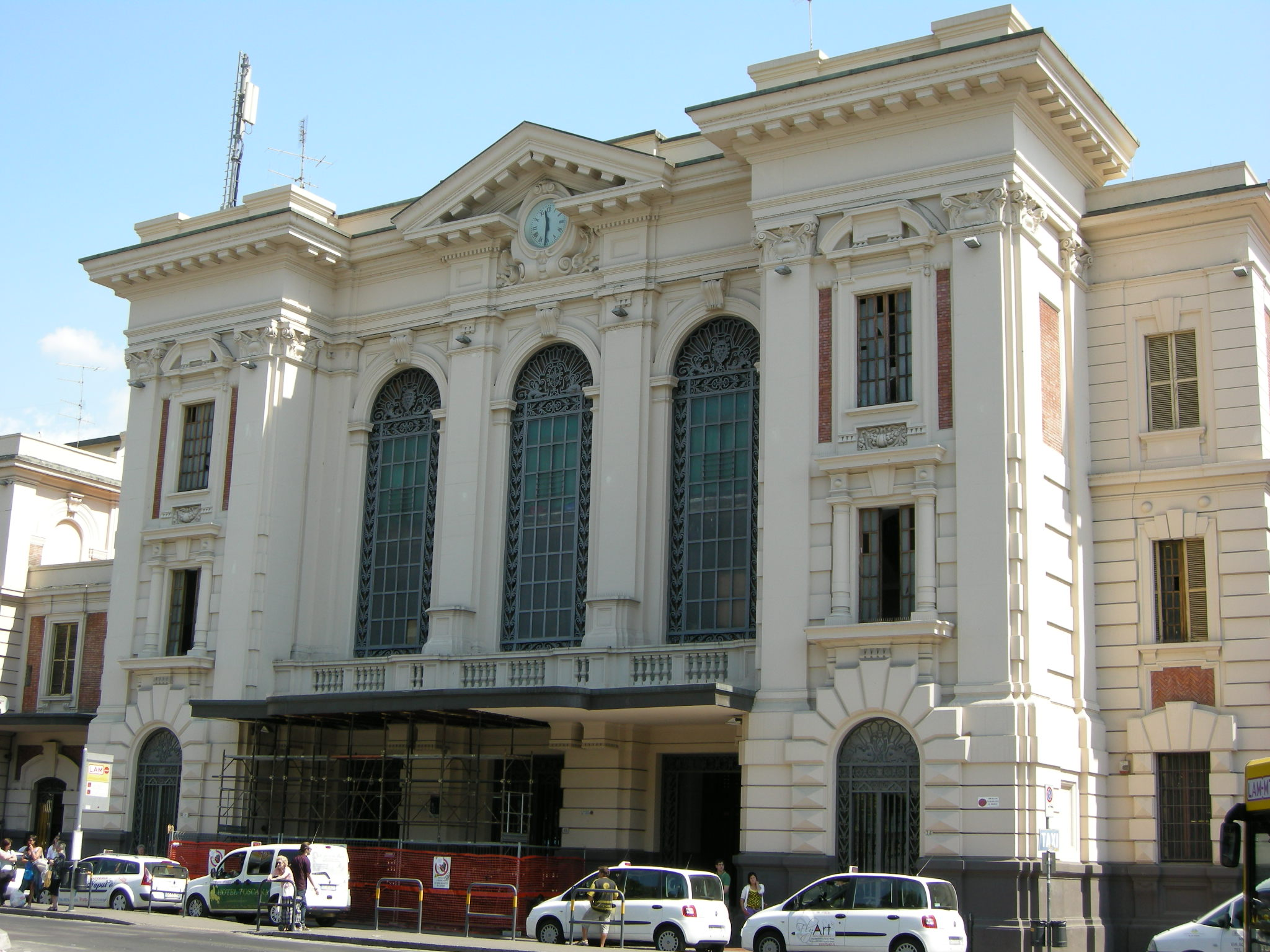
Prato Centrale railway station

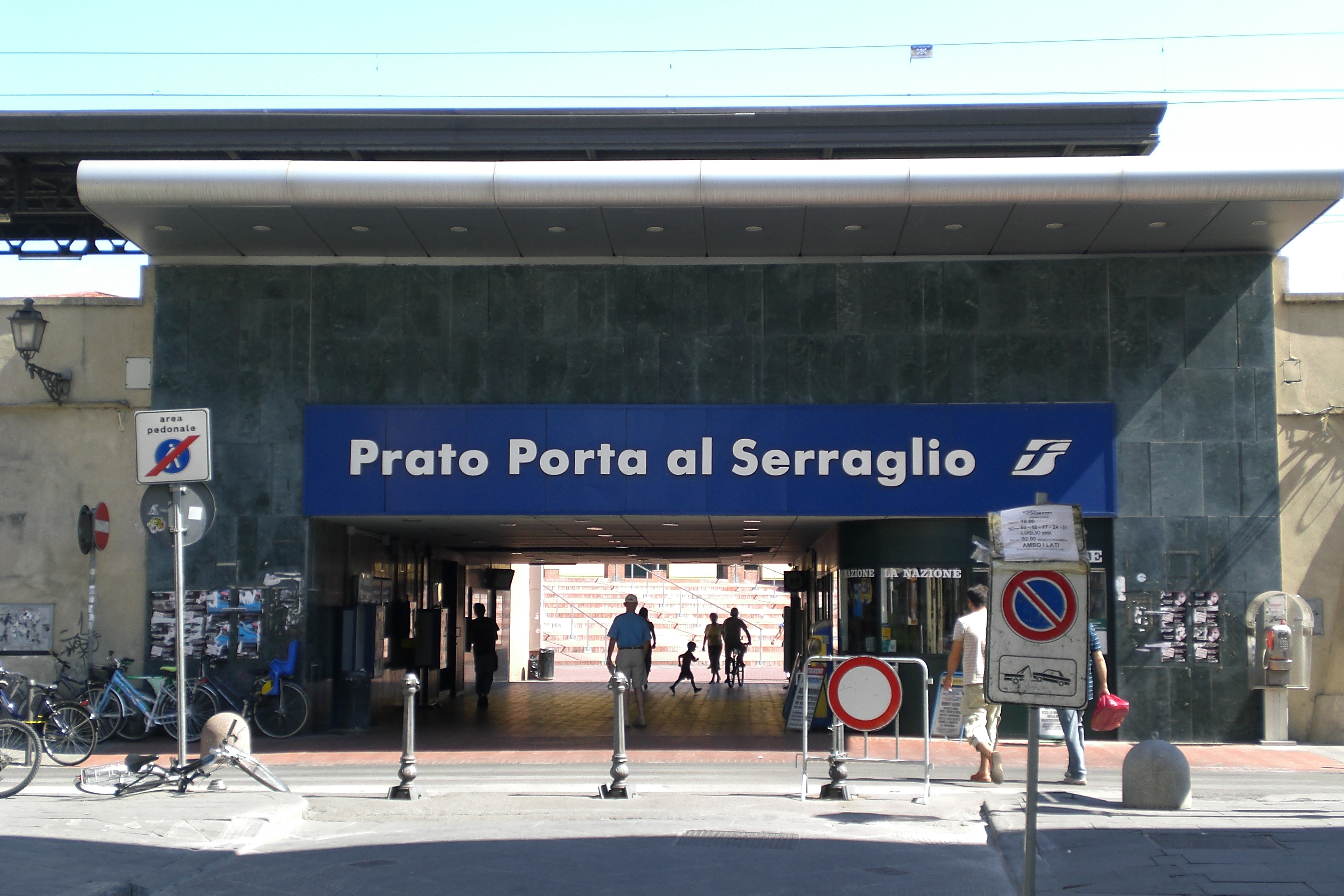
Prato Porta al Serraglio station

The city of Prato is crossed by two railway lines: the Viareggio-Florence Railroad and the Bologna-Florence Railways. The first is a regional line that connects it with Florence and western Tuscany, while the second is part of the Milan-Naples ridge and is one of the most important Italian railway lines. Prato is therefore served by some long-distance trains.

There are three railway stations in the city:

- Prato Porta al Serraglio railway station is situated in the historical center of the town and connects to Florence in about 25 minutes by the Viareggio–Florence railway.
- Prato Centrale railway station was opened in 1862 and is the largest station in Prato. It is part of Bologna–Florence railway and Viareggio–Florence railway.
- Prato Borgonuovo Station

=== Highways ===
- Motorway A11 (Firenze-Mare): Prato is served by A11 motorway through two toll stations: Prato Est and Prato Ovest.
- Motorway A1 (Milano-Napoli): Prato is served by A1 motorway through one toll station: Calenzano.

=== Buses ===
Consorzio Autotrasporti Pratese, also known CAP Autolinee, was a Società consortile a responsabilità limitata (Scarl) that operated since 2005 the local public transport in Prato and in the province and partly in that of Pistoia and Florence. The sole partner is Cap Cooperativa, whose members are also workers who cover the positions of travelling driving personnel. CAP Autolinee was part of ONE Scarl the consortium holder of the two-year (2018–2019) contract for the management of the TPL throughout the Region.

Since 1 November 2021, the public local transport is managed by Autolinee Toscane.

== Education ==
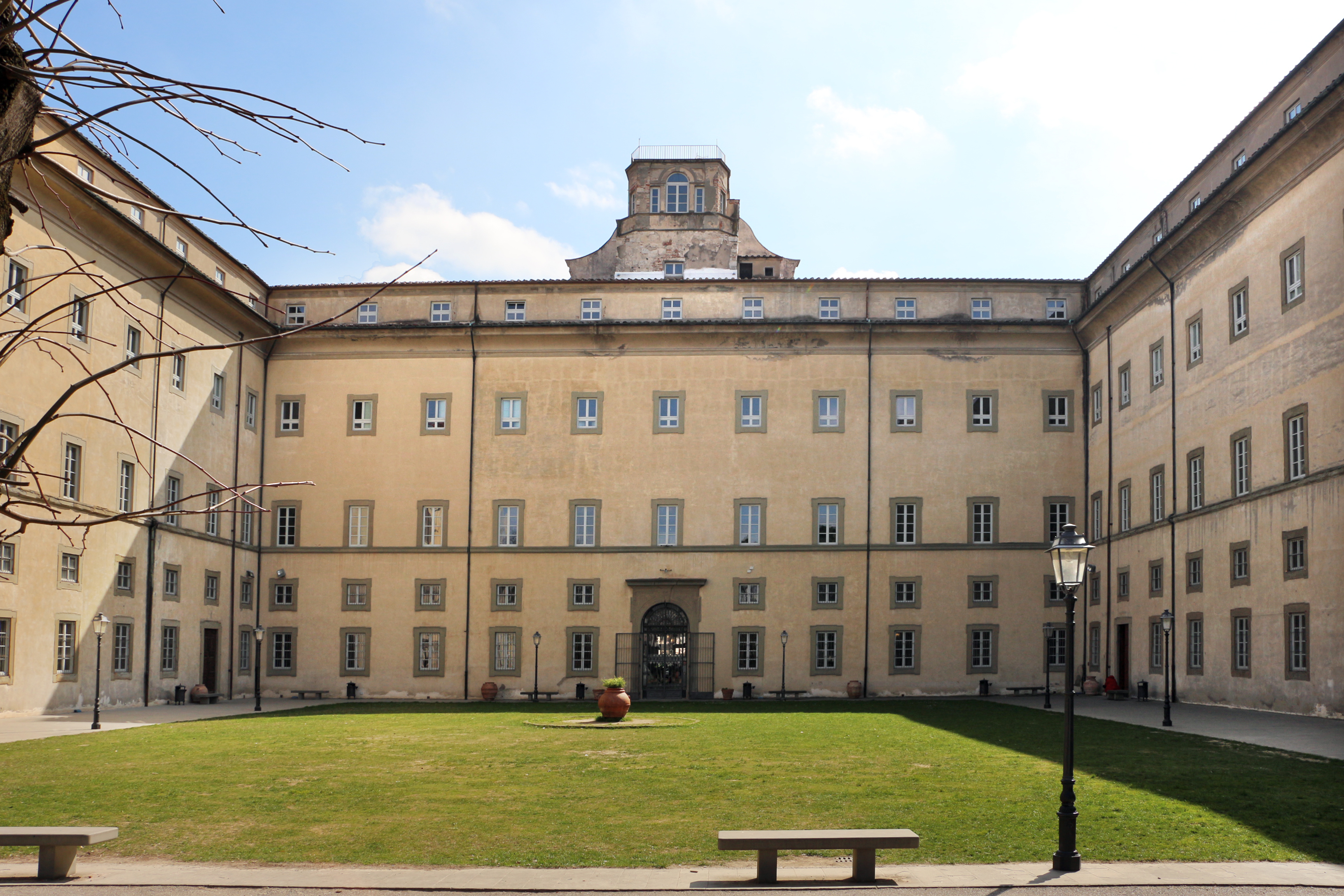
Convitto Nazionale Cicognini

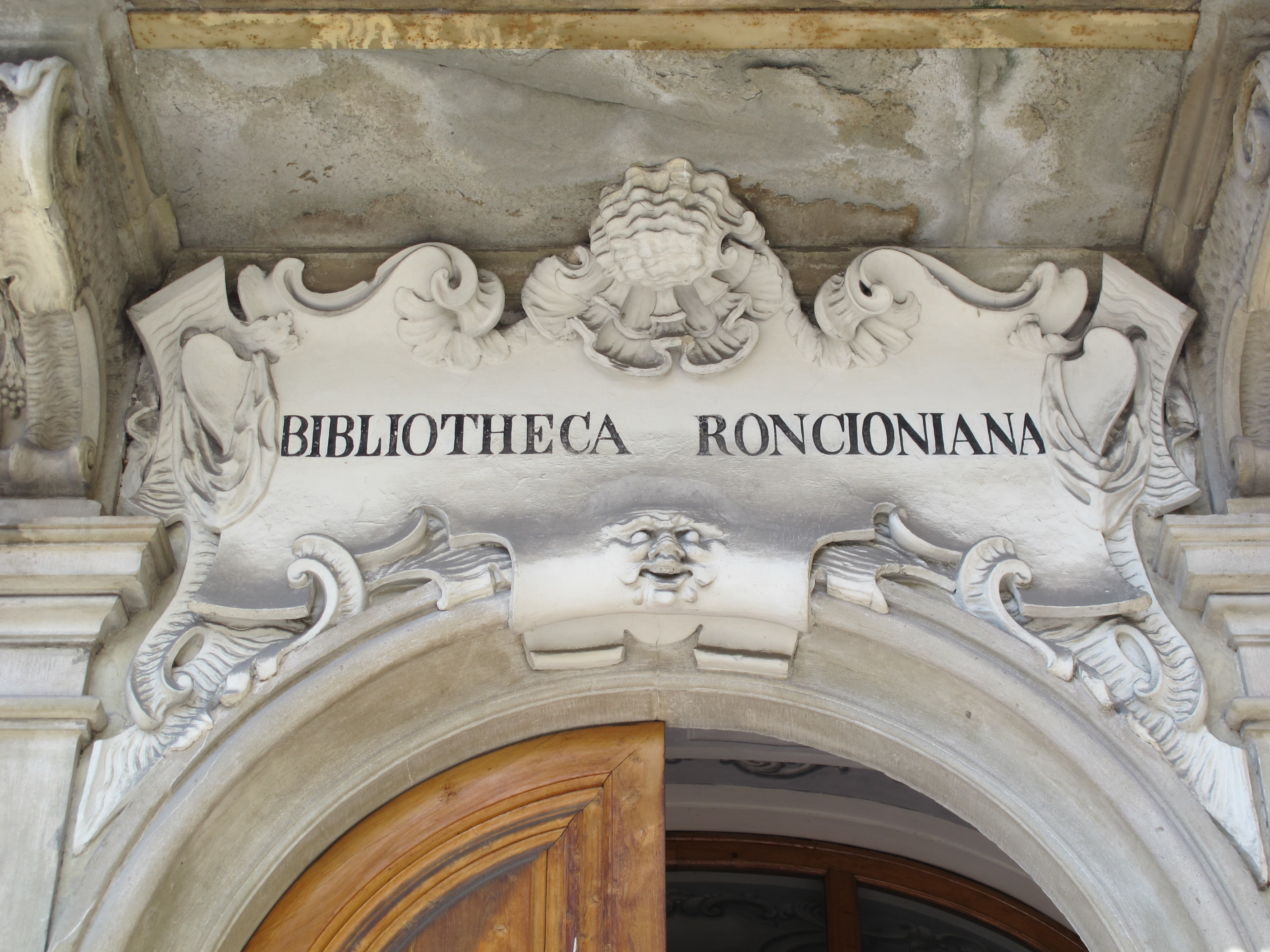
Roncioniana Library

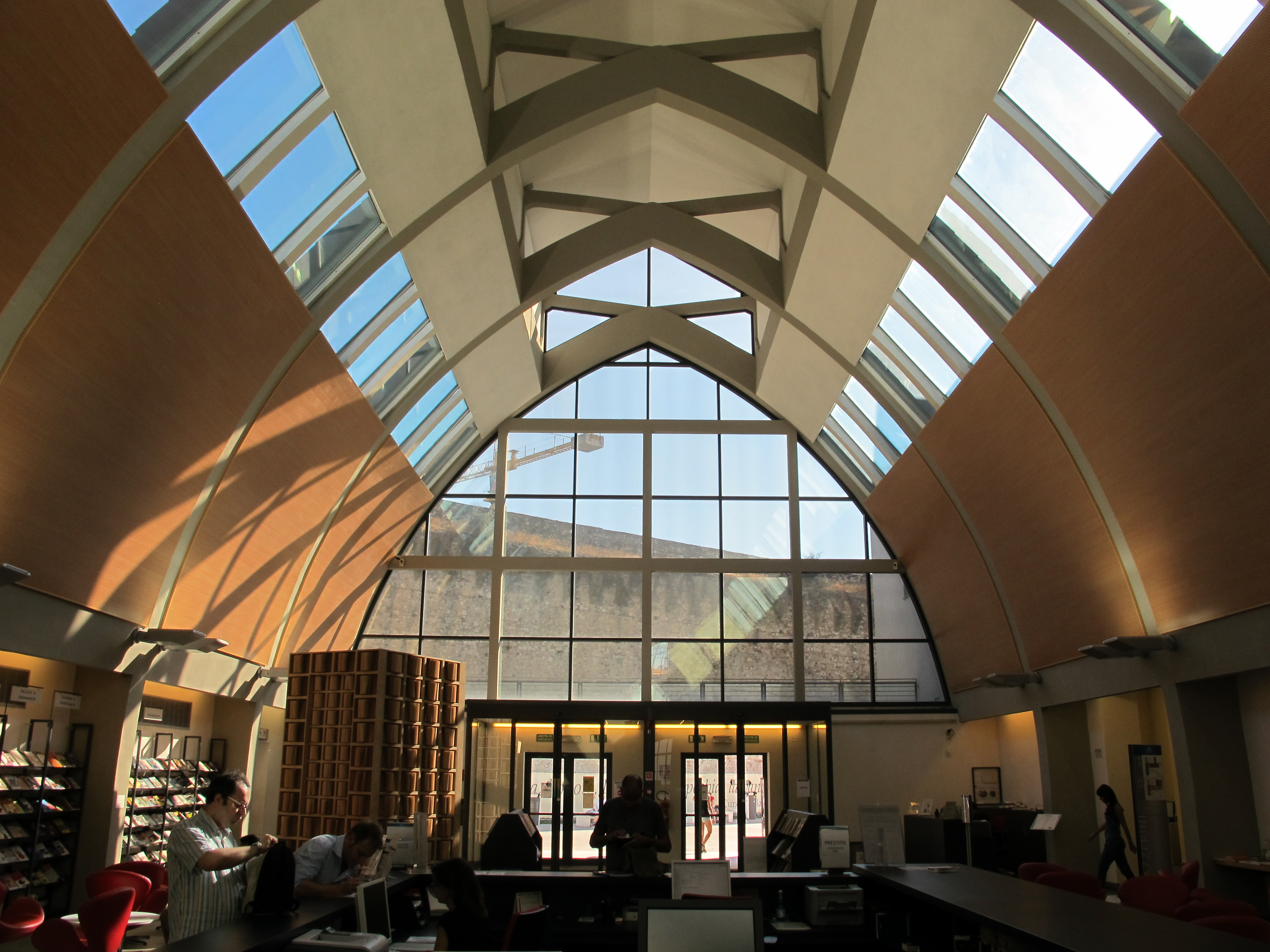
Lazzerini Library

The main points of reference are the University Campus of Prato (a branch of the Università degli Studi di Firenze) and the Prato Research Foundation which also includes the Istituto Geofisico Toscano, in addition to the creation of a Research Center financed by local authorities and the Chamber of Commerce.

=== Italian Universities ===
From the early nineties, the city is home to an important university center with over 2000 registered students, called "University Campus of Prato", born from the collaboration between the University of Florence and a consortium company born from the collaboration between local authorities (first of all the Municipality of Prato) and various private subjects, the PIN Scrl, owner of the building (formerly the prestigious Istituto T. Buzzi and renovated for the occasion) which houses the polo. Some courses of study are underway at the faculty of economics, letters and philosophy, engineering, medicine and surgery and political sciences of the Florentine university.

=== Foreign Universities ===
- Monash University, Australia has an office in Palazzo Vai that opened in September 2001.
- University of New Haven, US opened a satellite campus in the fall of 2012.
- Beacon College, US began a Prato study abroad program the fall of 2017.

=== High schools ===
- Cosimo Bellini Institutes
- Conservatory of San Niccolò
- Cicognini, State National Boarding School
- Liceo Scientifico / Linguistico Statale "Carlo Livi"
- Liceo Scientifico / Linguistico Statale "Niccolò Copernico"
- Liceo Artistico Statale "Umberto Brunelleschi"
- "F. Cicognini" Classical High School
- Liceo Socio Psycho-pedagogical and Social Sciences "Gianni Rodari"
- State Institute of Higher Education "A. Gramsci – J.M. Keynes"
- Tullio Buzzi State Technical Industrial Institute
- Paolo Dagomari State Technical Commercial Institute
- Istituto Tecnico Agrario e Professionale Alberghiero di Stato "Francesco Datini"
- State Professional Institute for Industry and Crafts

== Sport ==
- Rugby Club I Cavalieri Prato
- A.C. Prato

== Notable people ==
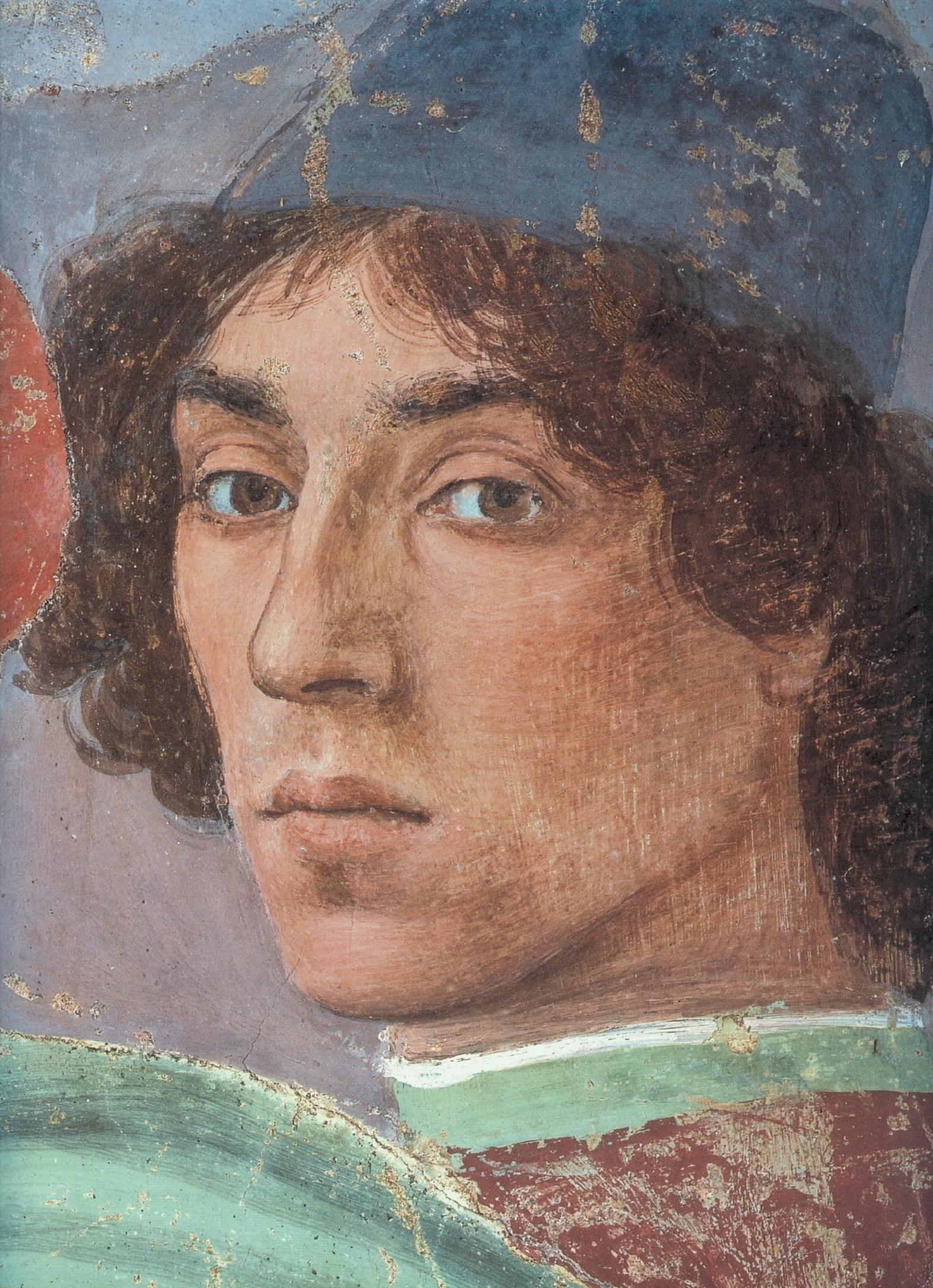
Filippino Lippi, self-portrait. Detail from The Dispute with Simon Magus (1481–1482). Fresco. Brancacci Chapel, Florence.

- Nicolò Albertini, 13th-century cardinal
- Lorenzo Bartolini, sculptor
- Sem Benelli, writer
- Roberto Benigni, actor and director
- Francesca Bertini, actress
- Gaetano Bresci, anarchist and assassin of King Umberto I
- Antonio Brunelli, composer
- Clara Calamai, actress
- Ferdinando Castagnoli, archaeologist
- Jury Chechi, gymnast, Olympic gold medalist
- Compagnetto da Prato, medieval poet
- Enrico Coveri, fashion designer and entrepreneur
- Lorenzo Dalla Porta, motorcycle racer
- Francesco Datini, 14th-century merchant
- Alessandro Diamanti, soccer player
- Emilia Goggi, opera singer
- Filippino Lippi, 15th-century painter
- Fiorenzo Magni, cyclist
- Curzio Malaparte, writer
- Filippo Mazzei, politician
- Armando Meoni, writer
- Giovanni Nesi, pianist
- Francesco Nuti, actor
- Iva Pacetti, lyric singer(soprano)
- Gianni Pedrizzetti, engineer and professor
- Biagio Pesciolini, composer
- Rachele Risaliti, Miss Italia 2016
- Paolo Rossi, soccer player
- Christian Vieri, soccer player
- Pamela Villoresi, actress
- Domenico Zipoli, composer
- Danilo Zanna, chef

== International relations ==
=== Twin towns – sister cities ===
Prato is twinned with:

- (United States) Albemarle County, U.S., since 1977
- Bir Lehlou, Western Sahara, since 1985
- Changzhou, China, since 1987
- Ebensee am Traunsee, Austria, since 1987
- Nam Định, Vietnam, since 1975
- Roubaix, France, since 1981
- Sarajevo, Bosnia and Herzegovina, since 1997
- Wangen im Allgäu, Germany, since 1988

== See also ==
- Cantucci
- Filippino Lippi
- Palazzo Pretorio, Prato
