= San Giorgio a Colonica =

- Interactive map of San Giorgio a Colonica
- Coordinates: 43°52′48″N 11°05′54″E
- Country: Italy
- Region: Tuscany
- Province: Prato

Area
  - Total: 4 km^{2} (1.5 sq mi)
- Elevation: 31 m (102 ft)

Population
  - Total: 1,500
- Demonym: Sangiorgesi
- Postal code: 59100
- Area code: 0574

San Giorgio a Colonica is a village of Prato with 1,500 people.

== Culture ==
There are a lot of monument in San Giorgio a Colonica:

- Roman Castle
- Church of Saint George
- Colzi's House

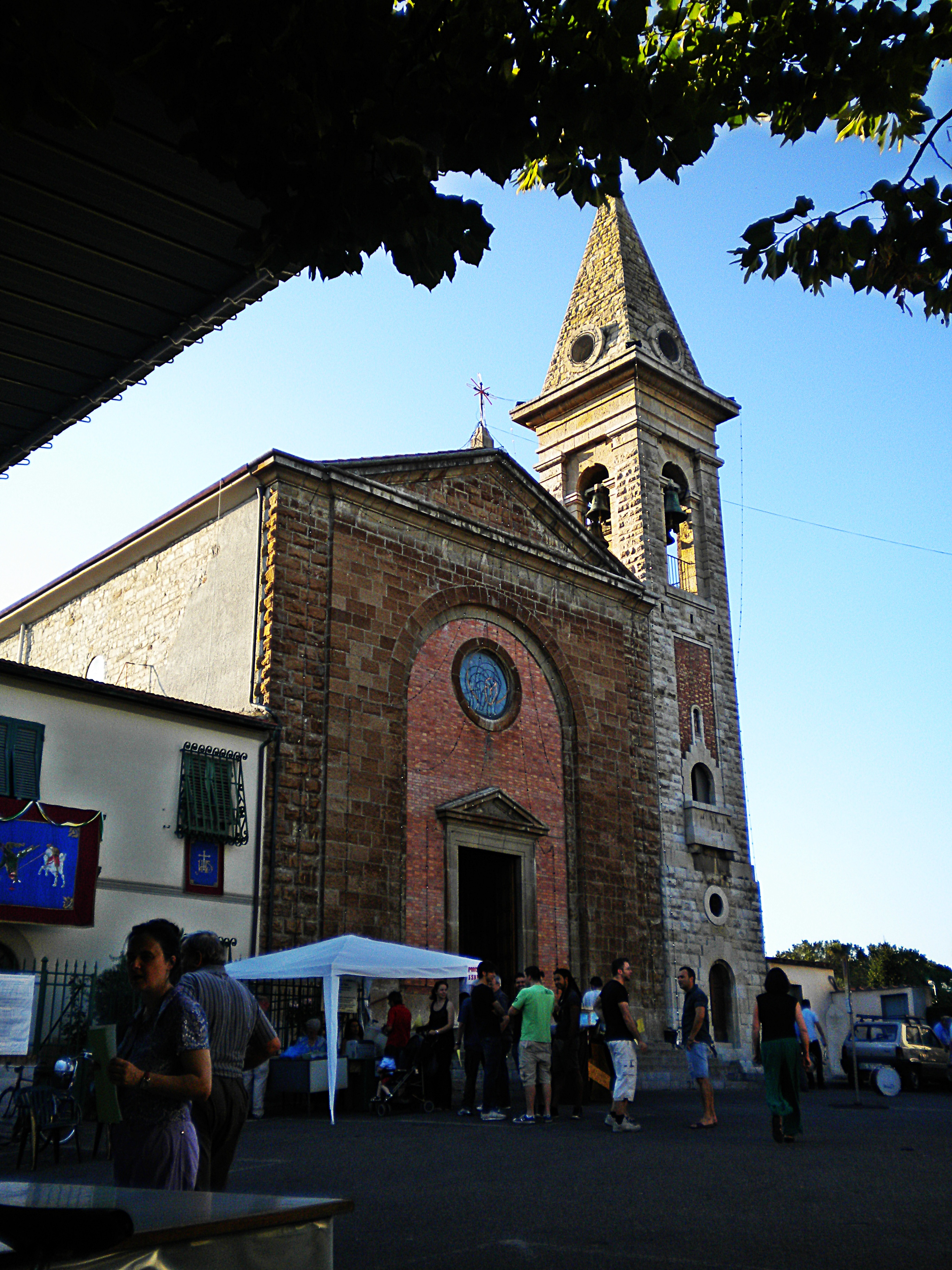
Church

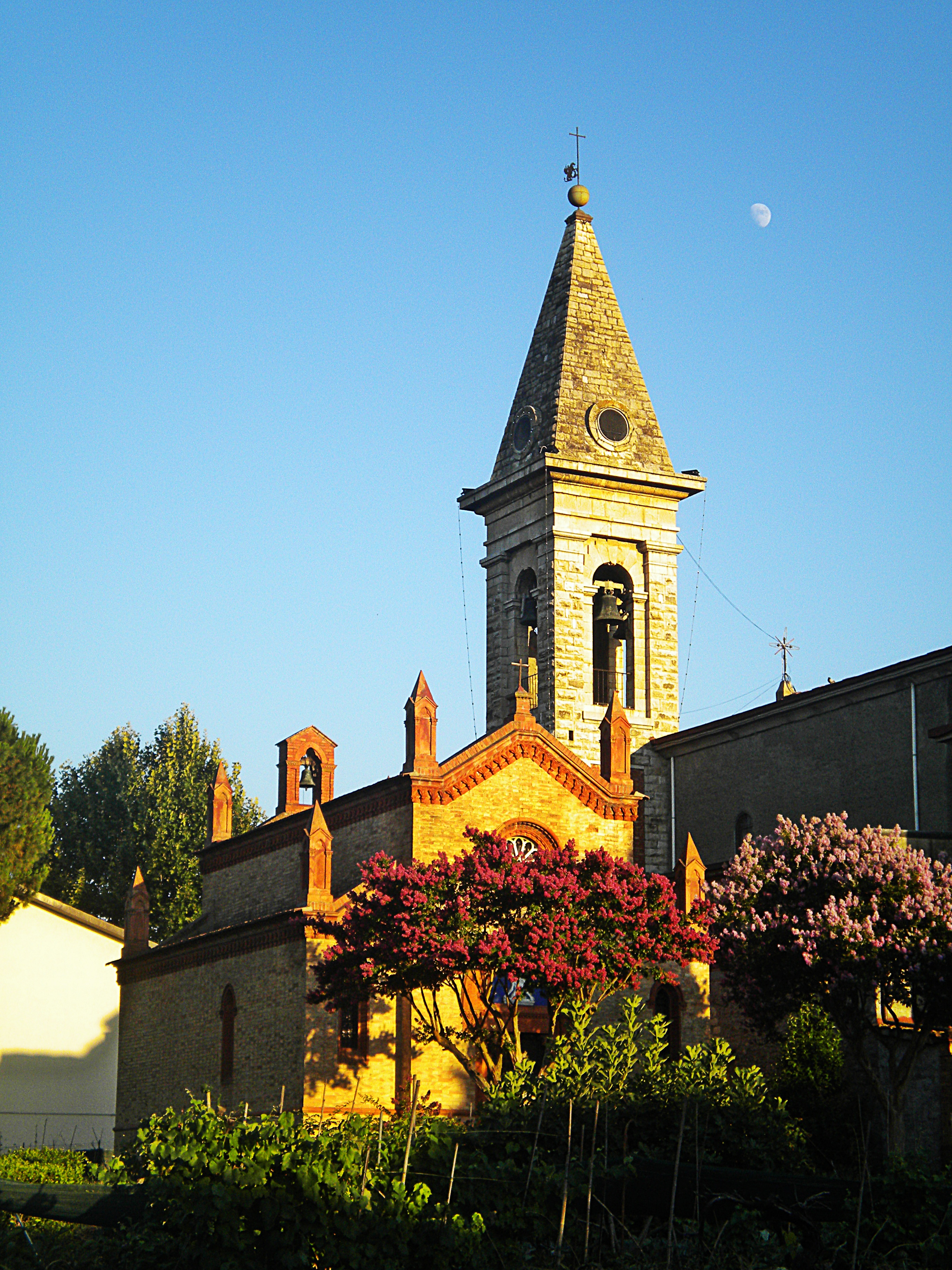
The moon, the bell tower and the chapel
