= Armando Meoni =

Italian novelist and journalist (1894–1984)

- Born: 18 January 1894; Prato, Province of Florence, Kingdom of Italy
- Died: 23 November 1984 (aged 90); Prato, Tuscany, Italy
- Occupations: Novelist, journalist, playwright

Armando Meoni (18 January 1894 – 23 November 1984) was an Italian novelist, journalist, and playwright.

== Life and career ==
Born into a working-class family in Prato, Meoni attended the Cicognini Technical School, where he became a lifelong friend of Curzio Malaparte. He founded Prato's first Socialist Youth Circle in 1908 and began publishing political articles and short stories before serving in the Royal Italian Army during World War I. After the war he combined a career in the textile industry with writing.

Meoni published numerous novels and short-story collections, becoming known for his realist fiction centered on ordinary people, particularly women. His best-known novel was La ragazza di fabbrica (1951). He also wrote books on the history and culture of Prato and was a longtime contributor to newspapers including La Nazione, Il Secolo XIX, Il Messaggero, and Il Resto del Carlino.

== Works ==
- Creare (1933)
- La Cintola (1935)
- Richiami (1937)
- Povere donne (1942)
- Il dono segreto (1946)
- L'ombra dei vivi (1949)
- La ragazza di fabbrica (1951)
- Assedio a Firenze (1956)
- Età proibita (1958)
- La cupidigia (1968)
- Prato, ieri (1971)
- Le virtù immaginarie (1971)

== Sources ==
- Bardi, Ubaldo (1987). Armando Meoni. Saggio per una bibliografia degli scritti conservati nella Biblioteca Alessandro Lazzerini di Prato. Prato: Comune di Prato.
- Lippo, Angelo (1978). Armando Meoni. Profilo di uno scrittore. Taranto: Grafiche Cressati.
- Lippo, Angelo (1996). Armando Meoni. La vita e le opere. Signa: Masso delle Fate.
- Toppetta, Roberto (1988). Armando Meoni. La vita e le opere. Prato: Edizioni del Palazzo.
