= Biagio Pesciolini =

Italian composer

Biagio Pescionlini
- Born: 1535; Prato
- Died: 1611 (aged 75–76)

Biagio Pesciolini (Prato 1535 - 1611) was an Italian composer. He was maestro di cappella of the Cathedral of Volterra in 1563, and then nine years later became canon and maestro di cappella at Prato.

Lodovico Zacconi's Prattica di Musica (1592, Venice) presents a 40-voice canonic motet by Pesciolini composed in 1590 for the baptism of the future Grand Duke of Tuscany, Cosimo II de' Medici.

== Literature ==
Michael Lamla: Kanonkünste im barocken Italien, insbesondere in Rom. dissertation.de, Berlin 2003, ISBN 3-89825-556-5 (vor allem Band 3, S. 324 - 337).

== Recordings ==
- Il terzo libro di madrigali, Venezia 1581 Tuscae Voces, Elia Orlando 2021 Tactus - the part books of the first and second books are incomplete
