= Castello dell'Imperatore =

Medieval castle in Prato, Italy

Emperor's Castle
- Castello Dell'Imperatore
- Prato, Tuscany in Italy
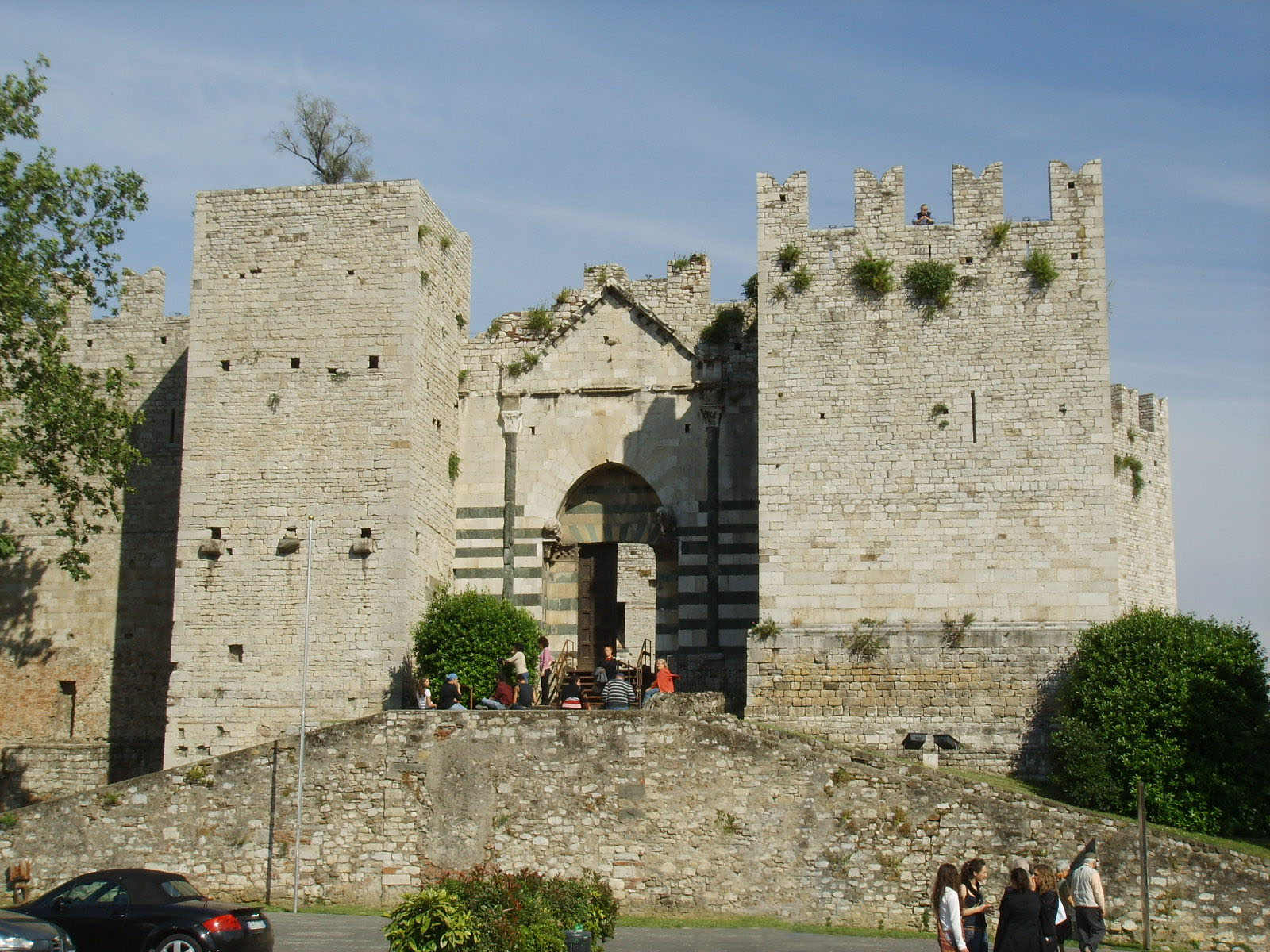
- Main entrance of the castello

Site information
- Type: Swabian castle
- Owner: Municipality of Prato
- Open to the public: Yes

Location
- Coordinates: 43°52′43.84″N 11°5′54.80″E

Site history
- Built: Between 1237 and 1247
- Materials: local stones

The Castello dell'Imperatore is a medieval fortress located in Prato, Italy. It is a castle with crenellated walls and towers. The castle was built for the medieval emperor and King of Sicily Frederick II, Holy Roman Emperor, on top of a previous fortification of which two towers remain.

When Frederick II died building was stopped and the interior was never finished. The castle is open to the public and although some destruction took place during the fascist regime, reconstruction work has begun and is ongoing. It is possible to climb the stairs up to the top of the castle walls and walkways for a bird's eye view over the surrounding city of Prato.

It was built between 1237 and 1247 by Riccardo da Lentini.

== Gallery ==
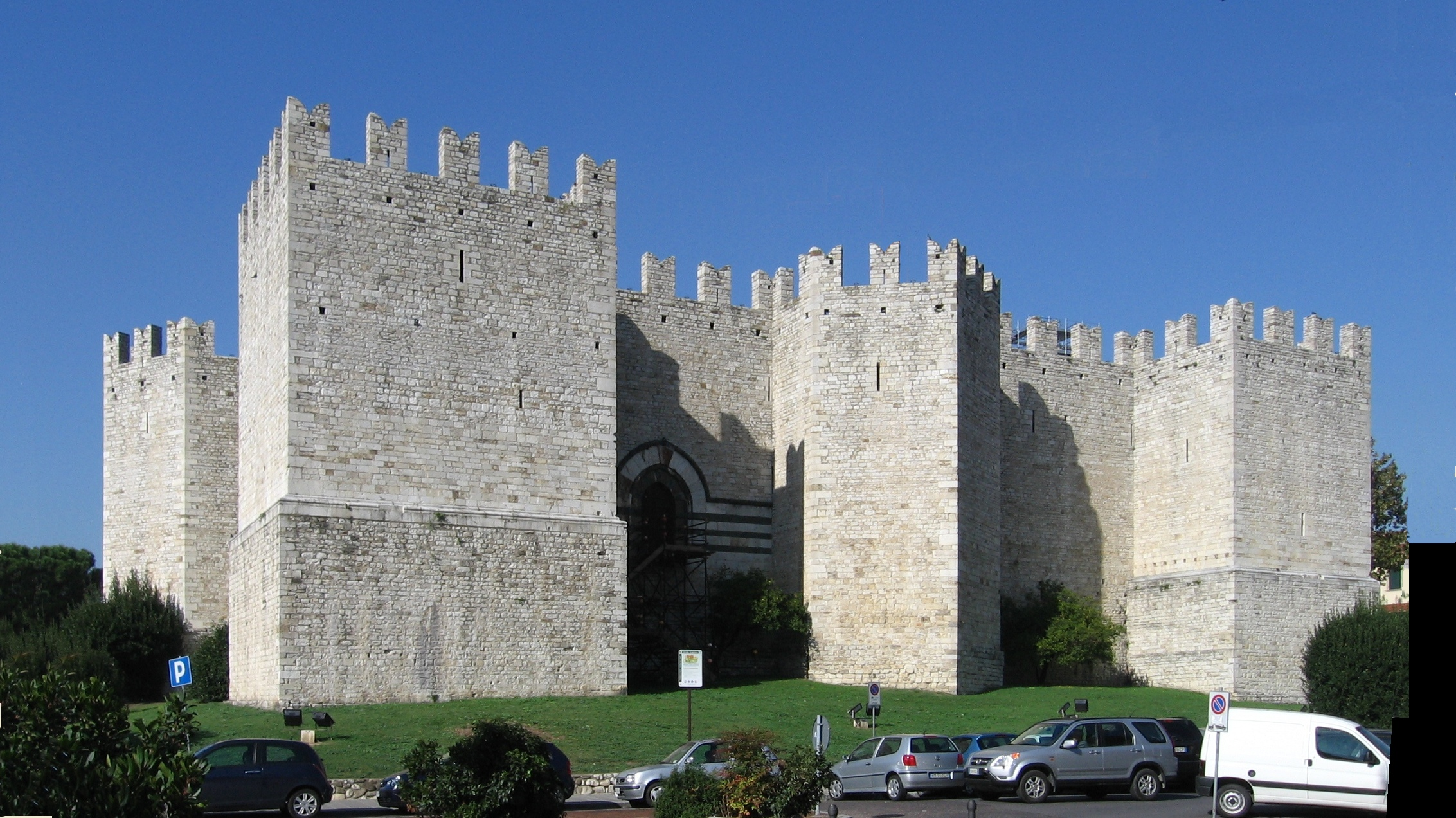
West view

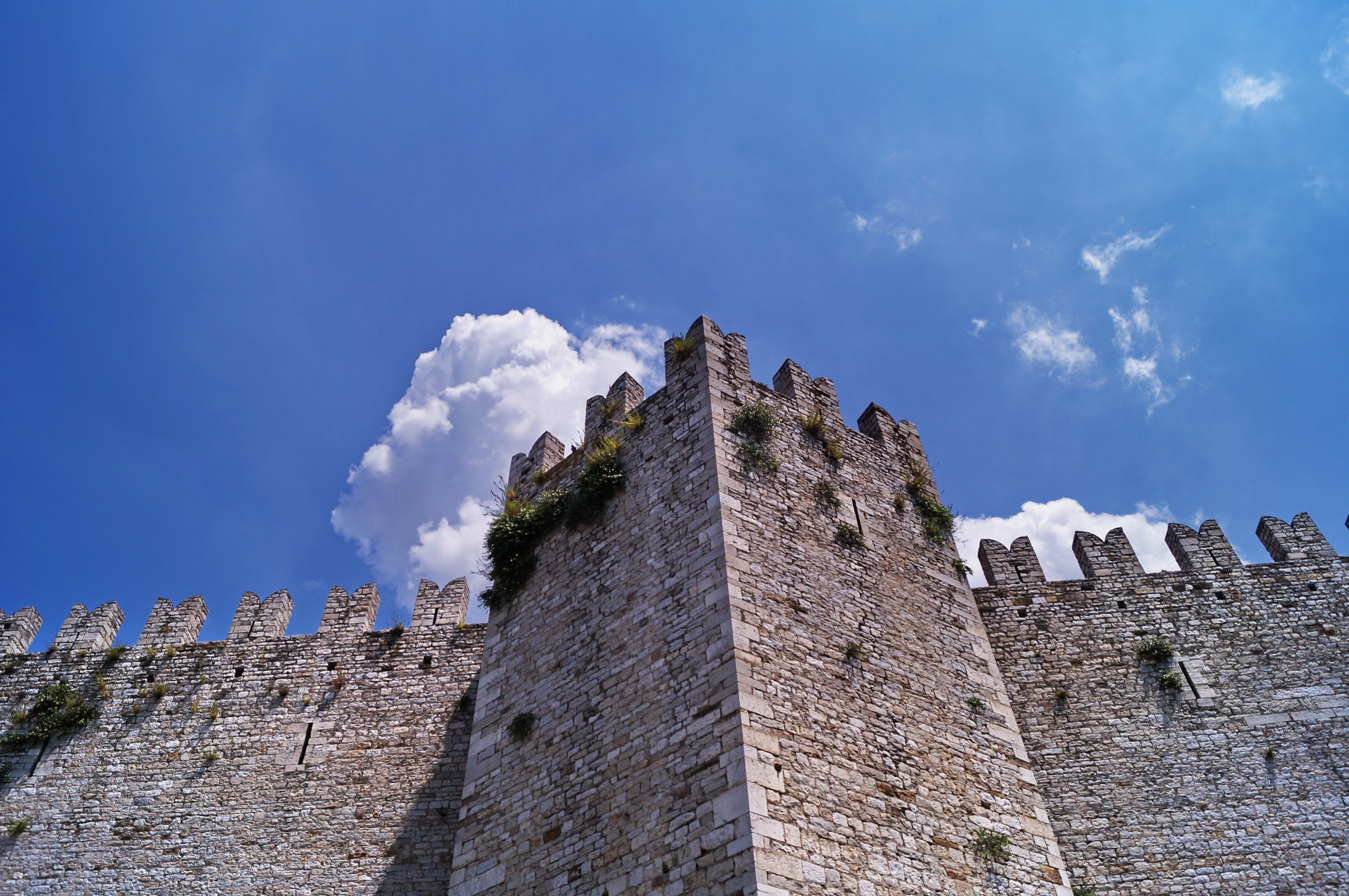
North view

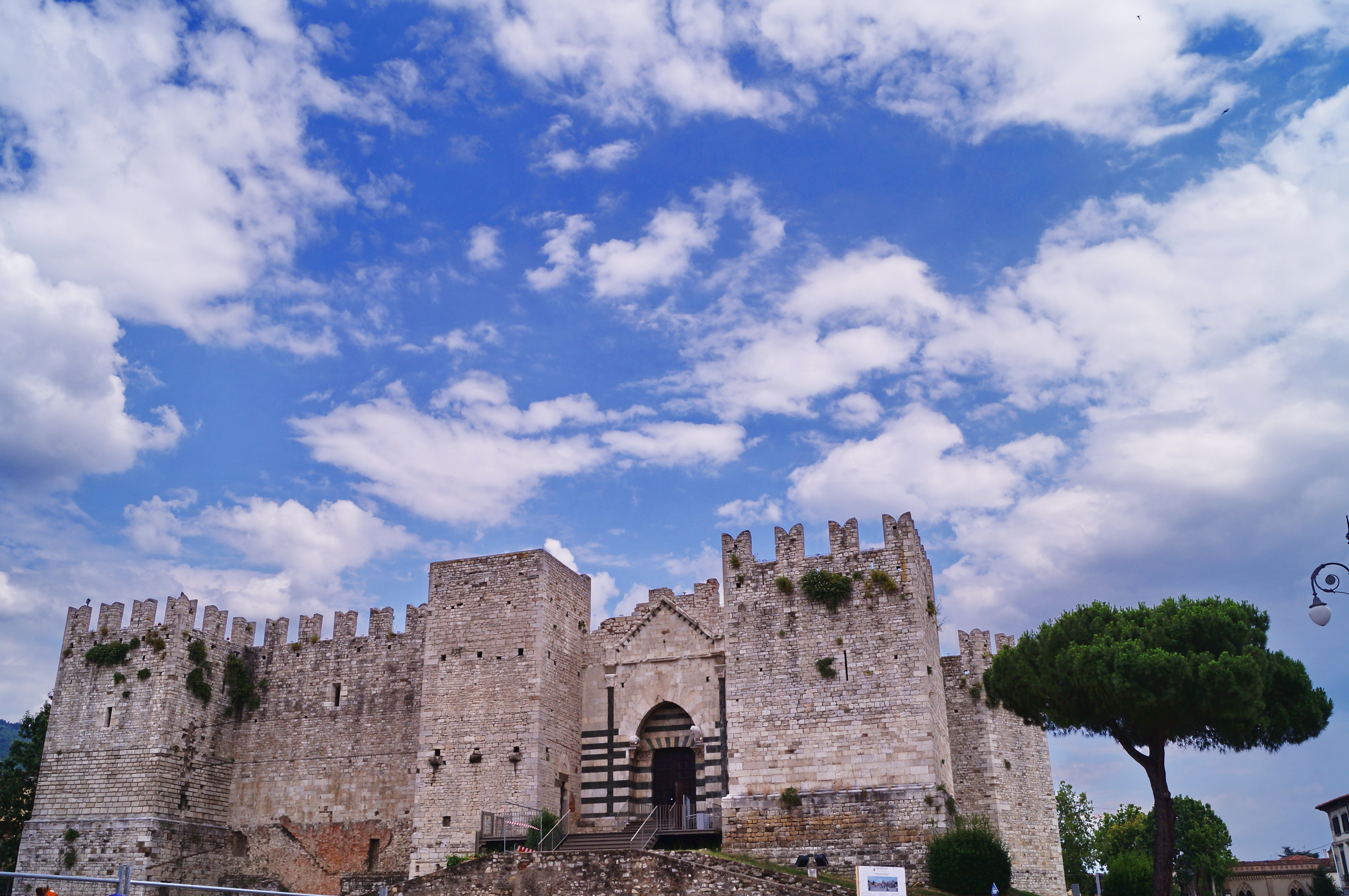
Main entrance

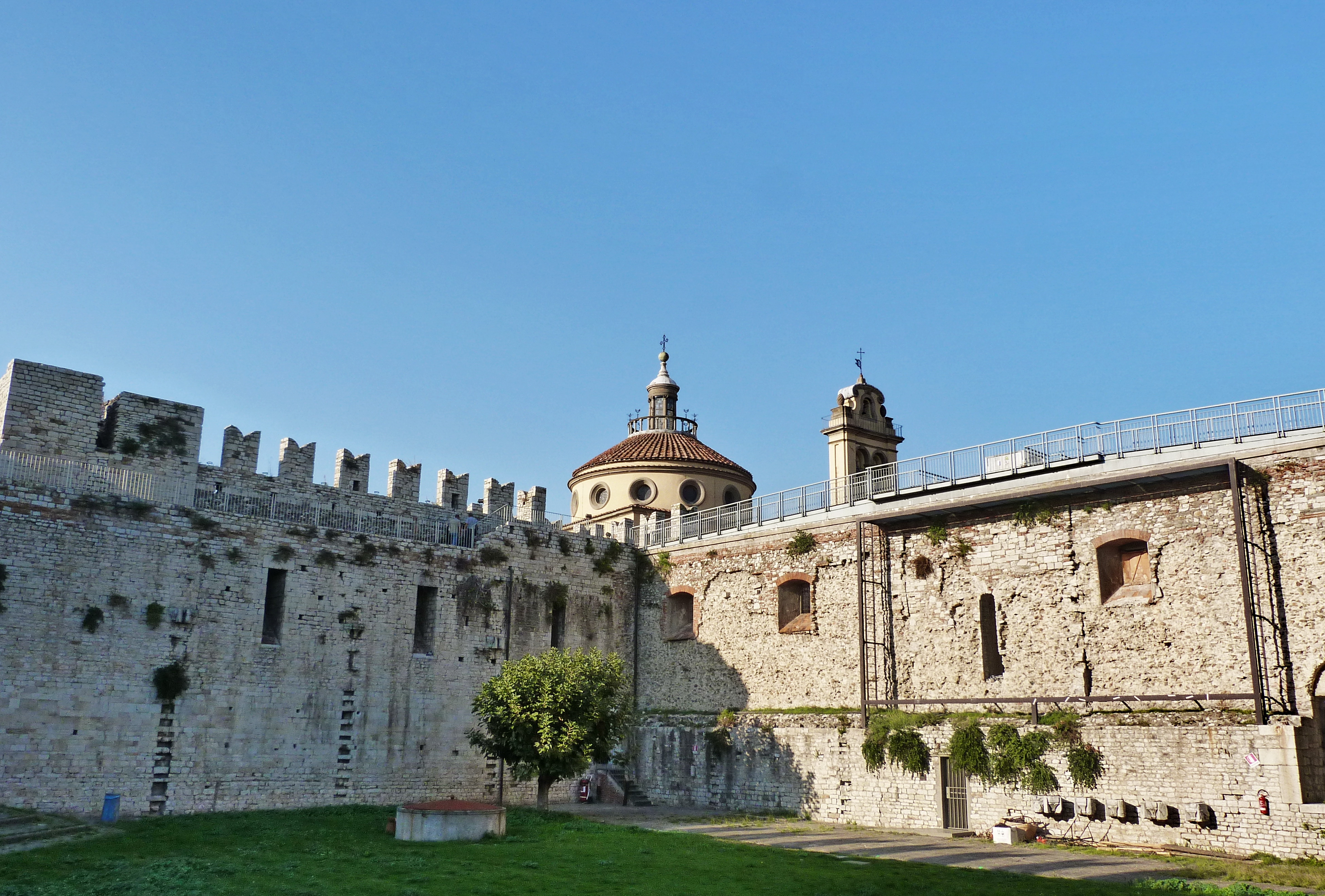
Corte

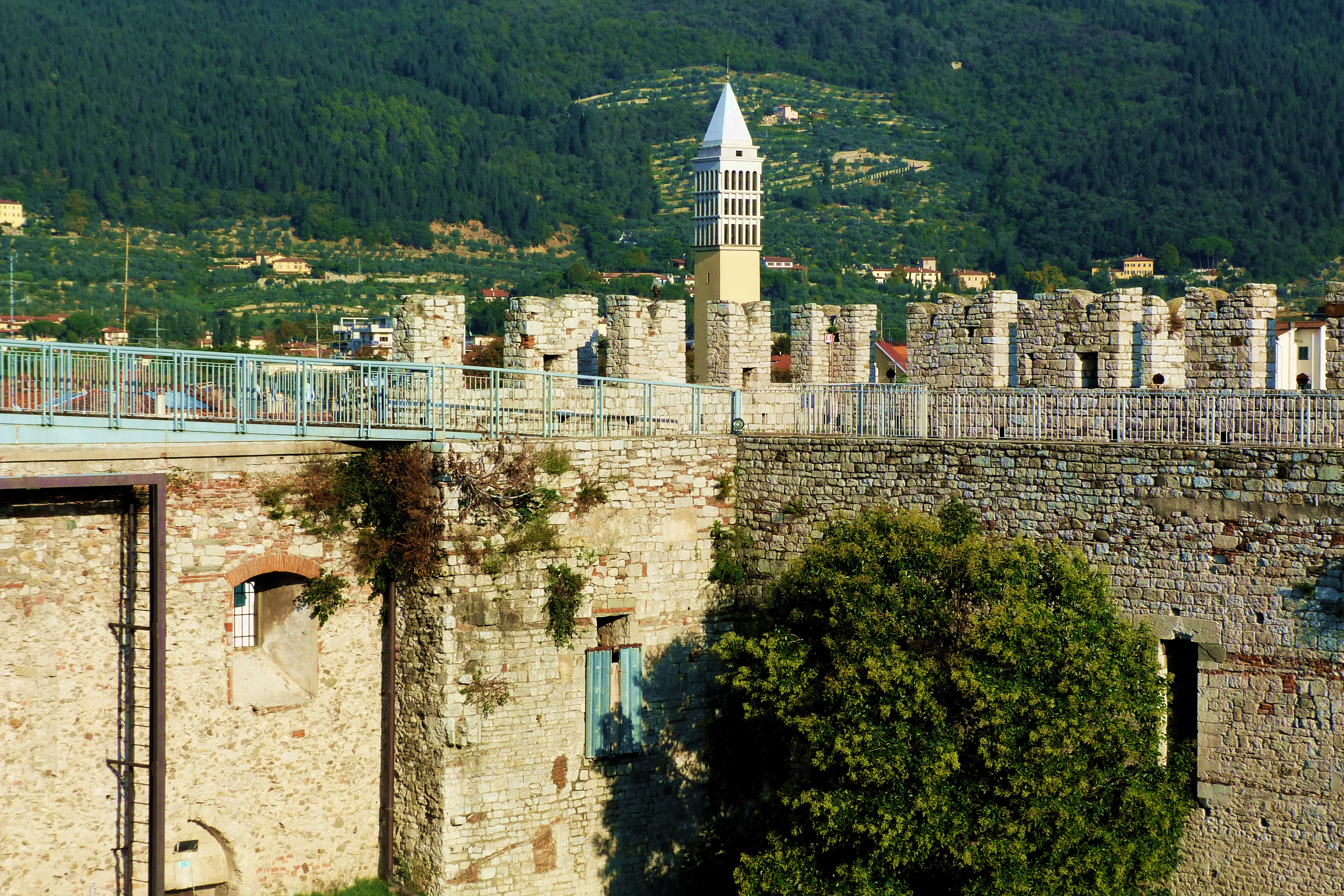

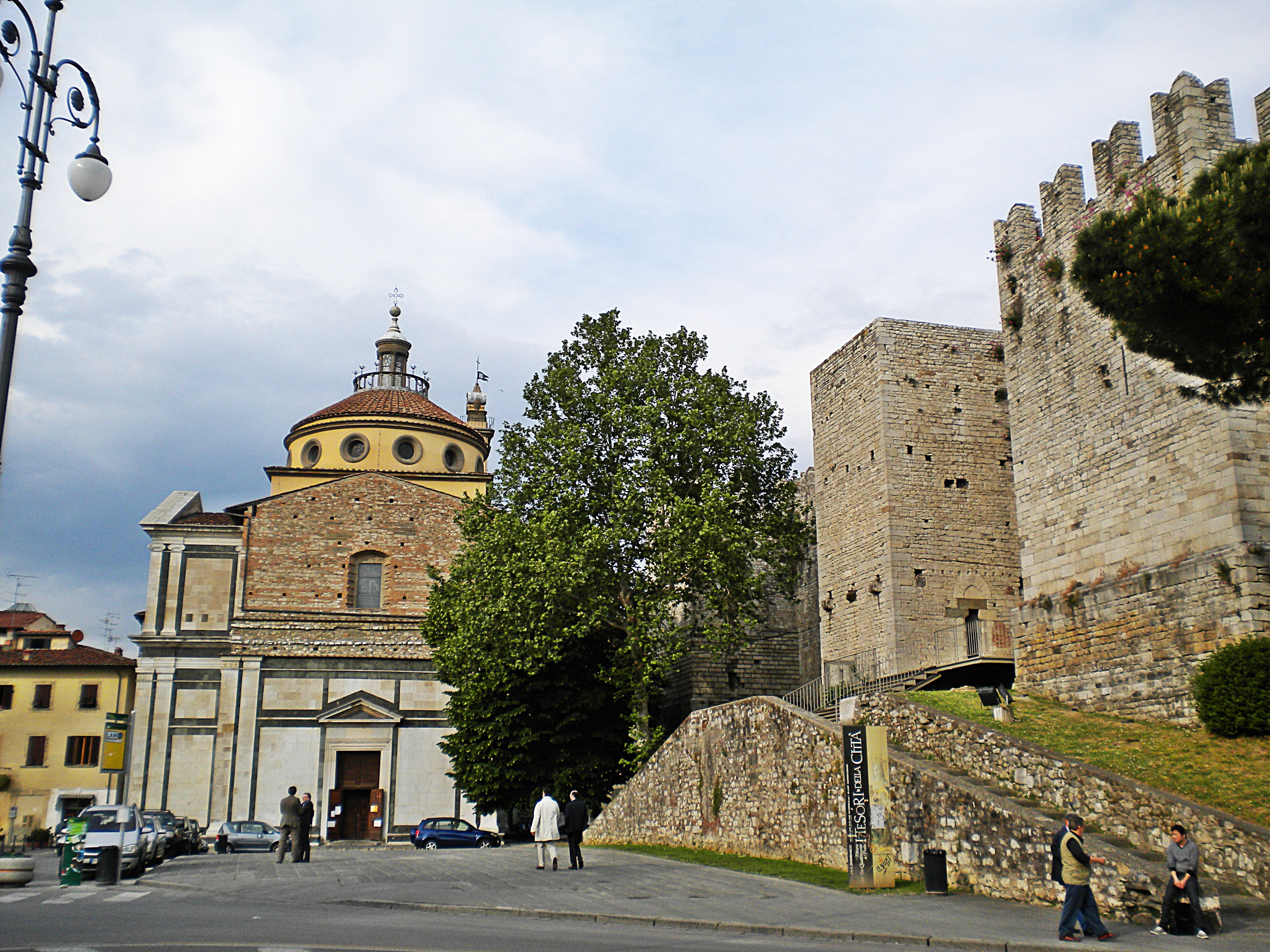
The church of Santa Maria delle Carceri and the castel

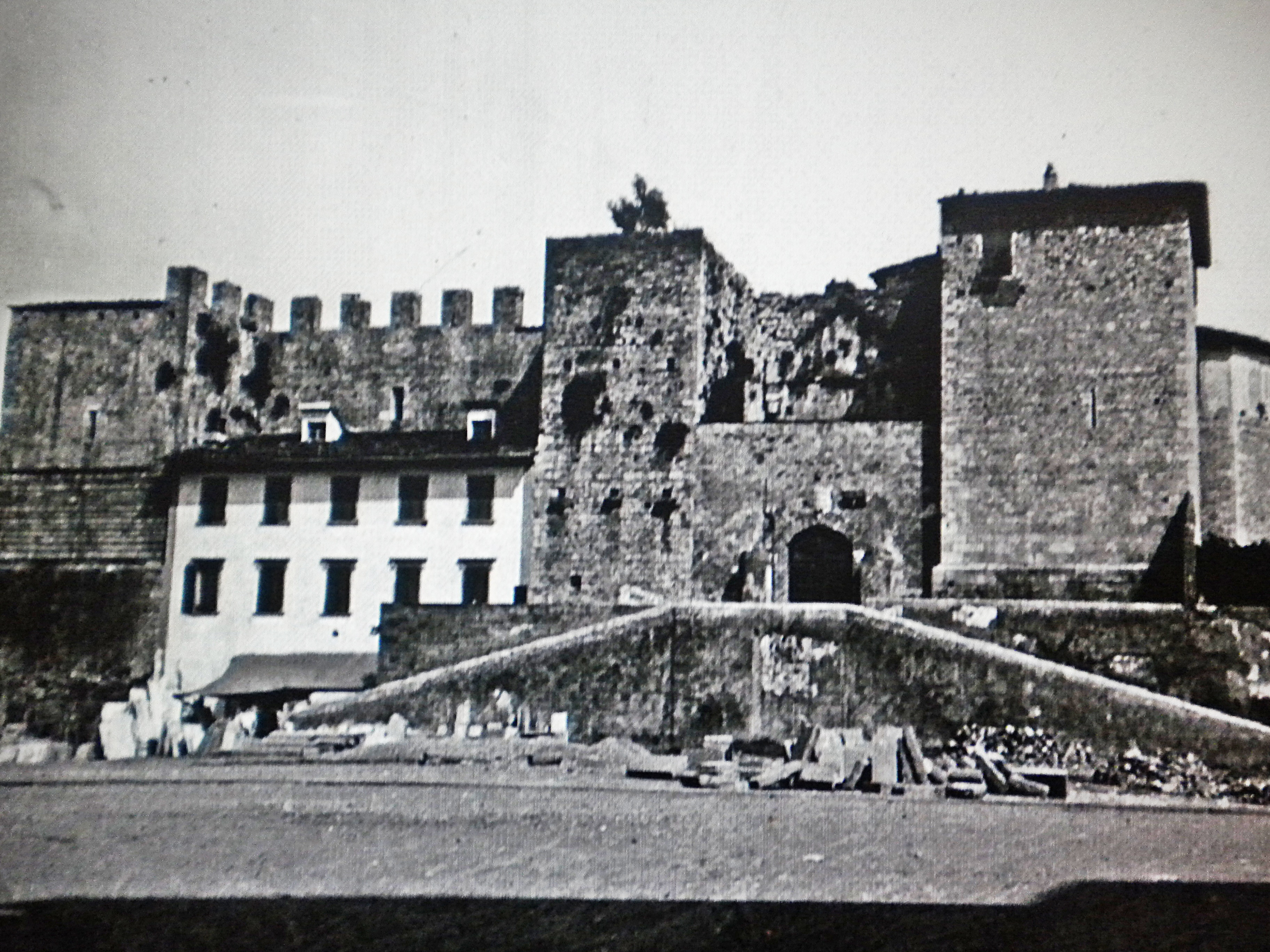
The Castel before 1930

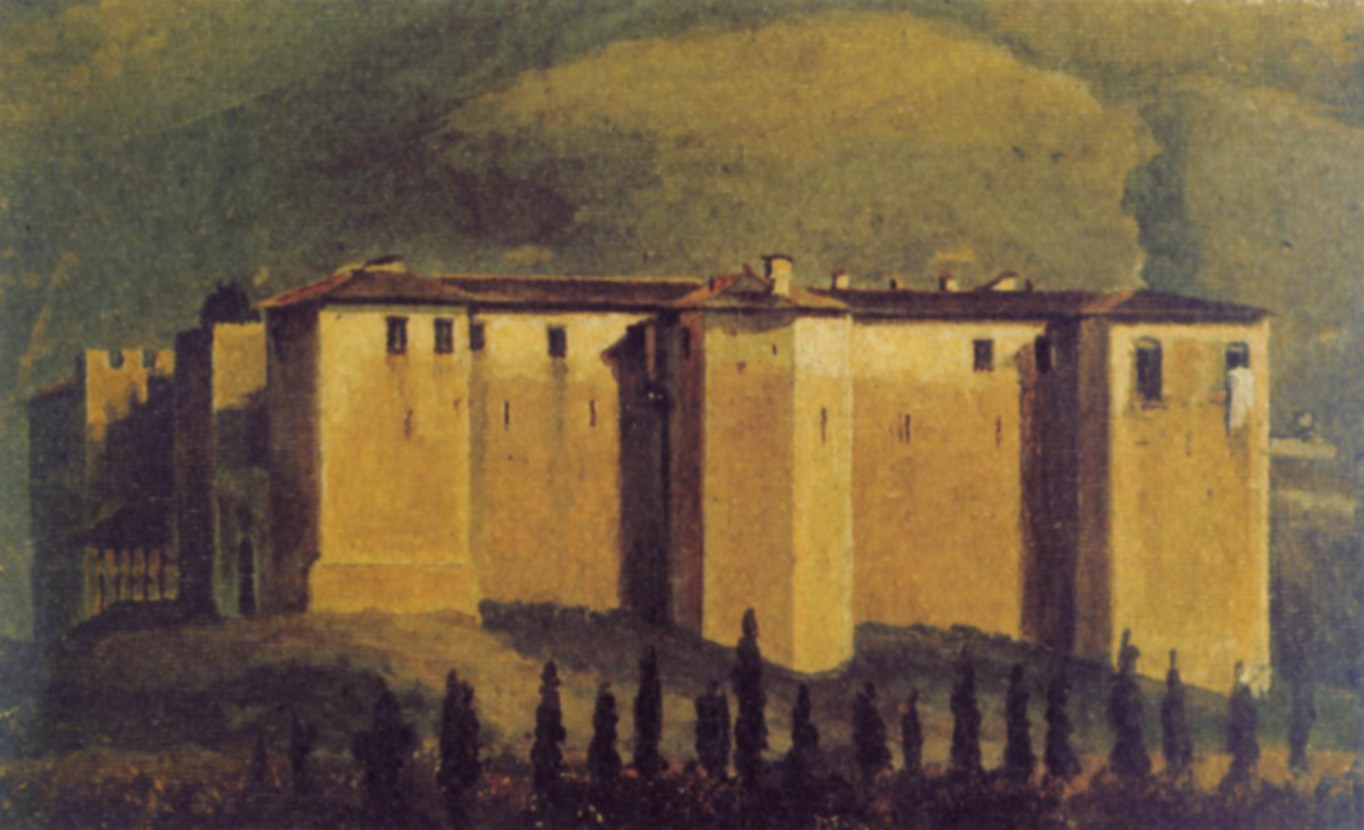
The Castel during the XVII Century

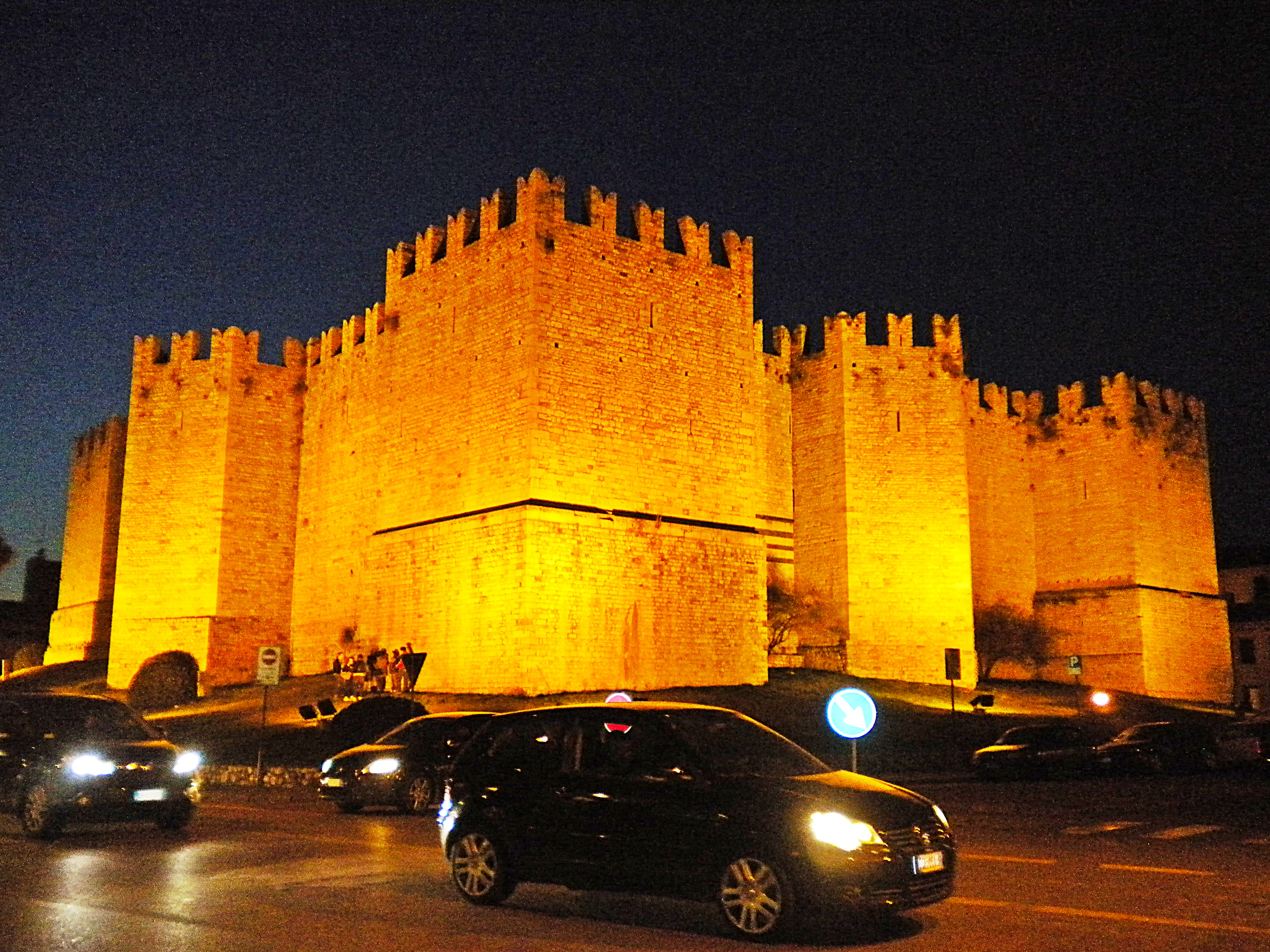
Night view
