= Gianni Pedrizzetti =

Italian engineering scientist (born 1963)

Gianni Pedrizzetti (born 7 September 1963 in Prato, Italy) is an Italian engineer who is a professor in bioengineering at the University of Trieste. His research is the application of fluid mechanics to cardiovascular science.

== Biography ==
Pedrizzetti earned his BS and MS degree in 1987 from the University of Florence in the Faculty of Engineering. In 1992 he received the title of Doctor of Philosophy, in hydrodynamics, from the University of Padua with studies on vortex dynamics and turbulence. He carried out postdoctoral studies at the University of California, San Diego (INLS) in 1992, working on theoretical aspects of turbulence, and at the Technical University of Madrid in 1994. Pedrizzetti has also been a visiting scientist at the University of San Diego (US) in 1995 and a visiting senior research associate at the University of Cambridge (UK) in 1998, while he was a permanent researcher at the University of Firenze from 1992 to 1998. Soon after, he became associate professor at the University of Trieste.

In 2006 Pedrizzetti obtained the title of full professor and continued his academic activities as Chair of Industrial Bioengineering at the University of Trieste, where he distinguished as one active scientist. In 2011-2012 he has also been 6 months visiting professor at the University of California Irvine; in 2012-2013 he was affiliated with the Mount Sinai School of medicine (New York). Since 2022 he is also project scientists at the University of California Irvine.

Professor Pedrizzetti scientific activity originates from theoretical fluid mechanics and turbulence, during his early post-doc in University of California San Diego, Madrid, Cambridge (UK). Later, he started working on cardiac mechanics trying to answer questions raised by cardiologists. In 2000 he pioneered studies in cardiac fluid mechanics and on the formation of vortices in the human heart. Author has also focused on development of more accurate techniques for the assessment of cardiac function. He is now author of hundreds of scientific papers ranging from fluid mechanics to cardiac mechanics to clinical cardiology, with thousands of citations, and recently published a monographic book on “Fluid Mechanics for Cardiovascular Engineering” (Springer). He is also designed inventor of numerous patents and actively involved as scientific consultant in the development of several products by medical imaging industry.

His scientific activity is about cardiac mechanics, with a focus on fluid dynamics and the interaction between blood flow and cardiac tissues. Research methods are grounded on theoretical and computational techniques and progressively evolved toward the development of medical imaging analysis aimed to extract mechanical and functional information about cardiac physiology and pathology for clinical applications. As a major feature, his approach is deeply interdisciplinary, while it keeps the methodological rigor coming from theoretical physics, it extends profoundly into medical research with the objective to transfer theoretical and engineering methods to contribute to clinical outcomes. In 2023, his interdisciplinary studies were awarded with the Kalmanson Lecture by the American Society of Echocardiography.
