= Monte Retaia =

Mountain in Italy

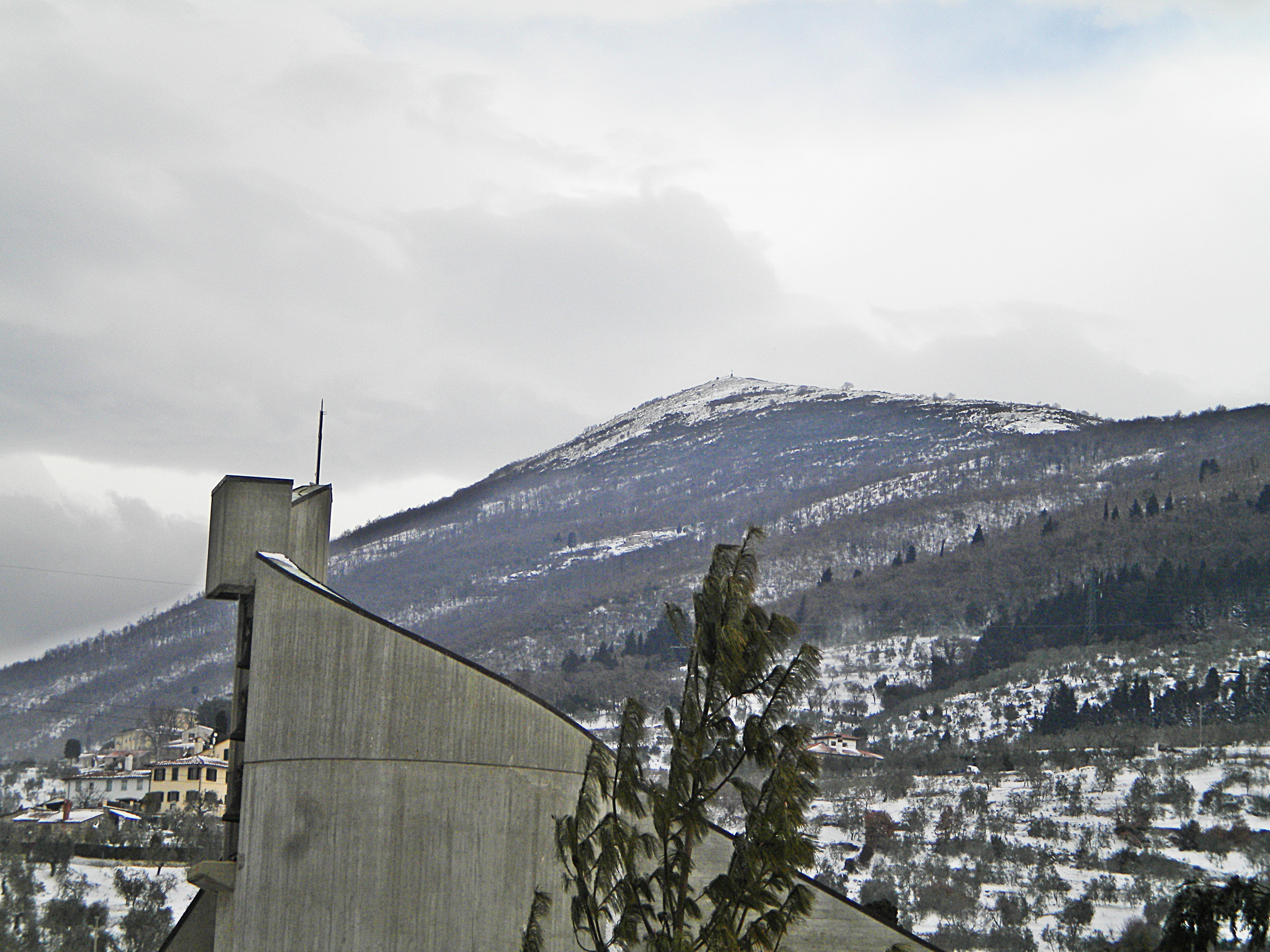
Retaia Mt.

Monte Retaia (768 m) is a mountain in the province of Prato, Tuscany, Italy.

Under the mountains there are many caves, the most important is "Buca del Cane" and other by the "Rio Buti" as "Fontebuia" and "Forra Lucia". This part of the Calvana complex offer many types of flowers, as the "Centaurea solstitialis", brooms, orchids and it is possible to observe many kinds of butterflies and animals.
