= List of sculptors in the Web Gallery of Art =

The List of sculptors in the Web Gallery of Art is a list of the named sculptors in the Web Gallery of Art (WGA). The online collection contains roughly 34,000 images by 4,000 artists, but only named artists with sculptures in the database are listed alphabetically here. The sculptor's name is followed by a title of one of their works and its location, which is hosted on the WGA website. For sculptors with more than one work in the WGA collection, or for works by unnamed or unattributed artists, see the Web Gallery of Art website or the corresponding Wikimedia Commons category. Of the 623 sculptors in the WGA database, there are only 2 women, namely Properzia de' Rossi, and Marie-Anne Collot. For the complete list of artists and their artworks in the WGA collection, the database can be downloaded as a compressed file from the website.

== A ==
- Niccolò dell'Abbate (1509–1571), 1 sculpture : Chimney breast, Château, Écouen (url)
- Antonio Abondio (1538–1591), 1 sculpture : Medallion Portrait of Emperor Maximilian II, Kunsthistorisches Museum, Vienna (url)
- Lambert-Sigisbert Adam (1700–1759), 4 sculptures : Child Pinched by a Lobster, Institute of Arts, Detroit (url)
- Nicolas-Sébastien Adam (1705–1778), 5 sculptures : The Martyrdom of Sainte Victoire, Chapel of Château, Versailles (url)
- Adriano Fiorentino (c. 1455 – 1499), 6 sculptures : Elector Frederick III of Saxony, Called Frederick the Wise, Staatliche Kunstsammlungen, Dresden (url)
- Agnolo di Polo (1470–1498), 1 sculpture : Mary Magdalene, Private collection (url)
- Agnolo di Ventura (1311–1349), 5 sculptures : Monument to Bishop Guido Tarlati, Duomo, Arezzo (url)
- Agostino di Duccio (1418–1481), 16 sculptures : St Bridget of Sweden Receiving the Rule of Her Order, Metropolitan Museum of Art, New York (url)
- Agostino da Siena (1285–1347), 5 sculptures : Monument to Bishop Guido Tarlati, Duomo, Arezzo (url)
- Gian Francesco d'Agrate (1489-ca. 1563), 1 sculpture : Sepulchral Monument to Sforzino Sforza, Santa Maria della Steccata, Parma (url)
- Leon Battista Alberti (1404–1472), 1 sculpture : Façade, Sant'Andrea, Mantua (url)
- Alessandro Algardi (1598–1654), 24 sculptures : Bust of Bishop Ulpiano Volpi, Museo Poldi Pezzoli, Milan (url)
- Christophe-Gabriel Allegrain (1710–1795), 1 sculpture : Venus at Bath, Musée du Louvre, Paris (url)
- Sebastián de Almonacid (c. 1460 – 1526), 1 sculpture : Tomb of Martin Vázquez (detail), Cathedral, Sigüenza (url)
- José Álvarez Cubero (1768–1827), 3 sculptures : Apollo, Museo del Prado, Madrid (url)
- Giovanni Antonio Amadeo (1447–1522), 1 sculpture : Playing Children, Cappella Colleoni, Bergamo (url) Incorrectly spelled in the Web Gallery as "Omodeo".
- Bartolomeo Ammanati (1511–1592), 20 sculptures : Falcon, Museo Nazionale del Bargello, Florence (url)
- Angelo di Nalduccio (1342–1389), 1 sculpture : The Archangel Gabriel, Museo Civico e Diocesano d'Arte Sacra, Montalcino (url)
- François Anguier (1604–1669), 1 sculpture : Montmorency Tomb, Chapel of the Lycée, Moulins (url)
- Michel Anguier (c. 1613 – 1686), 6 sculptures : Amphitrite, Musée du Louvre, Paris (url)
- Benedetto Antelami (1170–1230), 11 sculptures : June, Baptistry, Parma (url)
- Pier Jacopo Alari Bonacolsi (c. 1460 – 1528), 12 sculptures : The Belvedere Apollo, Liebieghaus, Frankfurt (url)
- Arnolfo di Cambio (1240–1302), 57 sculptures : Tomb of Cardinal de Braye, San Domenico, Orvieto (url)
- Egid Quirin Asam (1692–1750), 3 sculptures : Assumption of the Virgin, Pilgrimage-church, Rohr, Bavaria (url)
- Tiziano Aspetti (c. 1559 – 1606), 1 sculpture : Perseus, Private collection (url)
- Claude-François Attiret (1728–1804), 1 sculpture : La Chercheuse d'esprit, Musée des Beaux-Arts, Dijon (url)

== B ==
- Antonio Baboccio da Piperno (c. 1351 – 1435), 1 sculpture : Main portal, Cathedral, Naples (url)
- Baccio D'Agnolo (1462–1543), 1 sculpture : Coat-of-Arms of Duke Alessandro de' Medici, Museo Nazionale del Bargello, Florence (url)
- John Bacon (1740–1799), 1 sculpture : Monument to Sir William Blackstone, All Souls College, Oxford (url)
- Jacques de Baerze (active 1390s -after 1399), 2 sculptures : The Dijon Altarpiece (detail), Musée des Beaux-Arts, Dijon (url)
- Alfonso Balzico (1825–1901), 1 sculpture : Margarete, Galleria Nazionale d'Arte Moderna e Contemporanea, Rome (url)
- Agostino Busti (1483–1548), 9 sculptures : Charity, Victoria and Albert Museum, London (url)
- Baccio Bandinelli (1493–1560), 12 sculptures : Adam and Eve, Museo Nazionale del Bargello, Florence (url)
- Thomas Banks (1735–1805), 2 sculptures : Monument to Captain Richard Rundle Burges, St. Paul's Cathedral, London (url)
- Jean-Auguste Barre (1811–1896), 3 sculptures : Mary of Burgundy, Art Institute, Chicago (url)
- Jacques-Jean Barre (1793–1855), 1 sculpture : The Tragic Actress Rachel, Musée du Louvre, Paris (url)
- Louis-Ernest Barrias (1841–1905), 1 sculpture : Nature Exposing Herself to Science, Musée d'Orsay, Paris (url)
- Albert Bartholomé (1848–1928), 1 sculpture : Tadamasa Hayashi, Musée d'Orsay, Paris (url)
- Paul Wayland Bartlett (1865–1925), 1 sculpture : Brazilian Frog, Musée d'Orsay, Paris (url)
- Lorenzo Bartolini (1777–1850), 6 sculptures : Elisa and her Daughter Napoléonne, Musée du Louvre, Paris (url)
- Antoine-Louis Barye (1796–1875), 10 sculptures : Panther Seizing a Stag, Art Institute, Chicago (url)
- Jan Peter van Baurscheit the Elder (1669–1728), 1 sculpture : The Abduction of Persephone by Hades, Royal Museums of Fine Arts of Belgium, Brussels (url)
- André Beauneveu (c. 1330 – 1402), 1 sculpture : Gisant Portrait of Charles V, Abbey Church, Saint-Denis (url)
- Antonio Begarelli (c. 1499 – 1565), 3 sculptures : The Adoration of the Shepherds, Cathedral, Modena (url)
- Reinhold Begas (1831–1911), 1 sculpture : Mercury and Psyche, Staatliche Museen, Berlin (url)
- William Behnes (1785–1864), 1 sculpture : Bust of George Henry Fitzroy, Private collection (url)
- Bartolomeo Bellano (1437–1496), 3 sculptures : Education of Cupid in Vulcan's Forge, Galleria Franchetti, Ca' d'Oro, Venice (url)
- Gentile Bellini (1430–1507), 1 sculpture : Annunciation, Museo Thyssen-Bornemisza, Madrid (url)
- Benedetto da Maiano (1442–1497), 17 sculptures : Tomb Altar of St Fina, Chapel of St Fina, Collegiata, San Gimignano (url)
- Orsino Benintendi (c. 1440 – c. 1498), 1 sculpture : Cast of the Dead Mask of Lorenzo de' Medici, Museo degli Argenti, Florence (url)
- Joseph Bergler (1718–1788), 1 sculpture : The Sacrifice of Abraham, Liechtenstein Museum, Vienna (url)
- Giovanni Battista Bernero (1736–1796), 1 sculpture : Orion, Stupinigi, Turin (url)
- Gian Lorenzo Bernini (1598–1680), 88 sculptures : Saint Andrew and Saint Thomas, National Gallery, London (url)
- Pietro Bernini (1562–1629), 5 sculptures : The Assumption, Santa Maria Maggiore, Rome (url)
- Alonso Berruguete (1488–1561), 8 sculptures : St Sebastian, National Museum of Religious Carvings, Valladolid (url)
- Paul-François Berthoud (1870–1939), 1 sculpture : The Actress, Musée Bargoin, Clermont-Ferrand (url)
- Bertoldo di Giovanni (c. 1420 – 1491), 10 sculptures : Arion, Museo Nazionale del Bargello, Florence (url)
- Philippe Bertrand (1663–1724), 1 sculpture : The Rape of Helen, Musée du Château, Fontainebleau (url)
- Mattheus van Beveren (c. 1630 – 1690), 1 sculpture : Funeral Monument of Lamoral, Royal Museums of Fine Arts of Belgium, Brussels (url)
- Felipe Bigarny (c. 1475 – 1542), 2 sculptures : Main Altar, Condestable's Chapel of the Cathedral, Burgos (url)
- Herman Wilhelm Bissen (1798–1868), 4 sculptures : Bathing Girl, Ny Carlsberg Glyptotek, Copenhagen (url)
- Jan van Blommendael (1636–1707), 1 sculpture : Stadholder-King Willem III, Mauritshuis, The Hague (url)
- Simon-Louis Boizot (1743–1809), 1 sculpture : Cupid, Musée du Louvre, Paris (url)
- Andrea Bolgi (1605–1656), 1 sculpture : St Helene, Basilica di San Pietro, Vatican (url)
- Bartolomeo Bon (1421–1464), 7 sculptures : Head of Francesco Foscari, Palazzo Ducale, Venice (url)
- Giovanni Bon (c. 1355 – c. 1443), 2 sculptures : Porta della Carta, Palazzo Ducale, Venice (url)
- Bonanno Pisano (active late 12th century-), 3 sculptures : Bronze doors (detail), Cathedral, Pisa (url)
- Giovanni Bonazza (1654–1736), 1 sculpture : Annunciation, Basilica dei Santi Giovanni e Paolo, Venice (url)
- Bonino da Campione (1350–1390), 2 sculptures : Monument to Bernabo Visconti, Castello Sforzesco, Milan (url)
- Jean-Marie Bonnassieux (1810–1892), 1 sculpture : Our Lady of France (Notre-Dame-de-France), Rocher Corneille, Le Puy-en-Velay (url)
- Pierre Bontemps (c. 1512 – c. 1570), 4 sculptures : Tomb of Francis I and Claude de France, Abbey Church, Saint-Denis (url)
- Ambrogio Bonvicino (c. 1552 – 1622), 1 sculpture : St John the Baptist, Santa Maria sopra Minerva, Rome (url)
- François-Joseph Bosio (1768–1845), 4 sculptures : Aristaeus, God of the Gardens, Musée du Louvre, Paris (url)
- Francis van Bossuit (1635–1692), 3 sculptures : Mars, Rijksmuseum, Amsterdam (url)
- Edmé Bouchardon (1698–1762), 8 sculptures : Bust of Pope Clement XII, Galleria Corsini, Florence (url)
- Jean-Baptiste Boudard (1710–1768), 1 sculpture : Bust of Abbé Frugoni, Accademia di Belle Arti, Parma (url)
- Émile-Antoine Bourdelle (1861–1929), 3 sculptures : Large Tragic Mask of Beethoven, The Hermitage, St. Petersburg (url)
- Pietro Bracci (1700–1773), 7 sculptures : Tomb of Benedict XIV, Basilica di San Pietro, Vatican (url)
- Andrea Bregno (1418–1503), 9 sculptures : Cantoria, Cappella Sistina, Vatican (url)
- Antonio Bregno (1425–1457), 1 sculpture : Monument of Francesco Foscari, Santa Maria Gloriosa dei Frari, Venice (url)
- Giovanni Battista Bregno (1467-77-after 1518), 1 sculpture : Monument to Benedetto Pesaro, Santa Maria Gloriosa dei Frari, Venice (url)
- Filippo Brunelleschi (1377–1446), 5 sculptures : Sacrifice of Isaac, Museo Nazionale del Bargello, Florence (url)
- Andrea Brustolon (1662–1732), 3 sculptures : Jacob's Fight with the Angel, Liebieghaus, Frankfurt (url)
- Benedetto Buglioni (c. 1459 – 1521), 2 sculptures : Coat-of Arms Supported by Two Angels, Musei Vaticani, Vatican (url)
- Santi Buglioni (1494–1576), 5 sculptures : Façade with Loggia, Ospedale del Ceppo, Pistoia (url)
- Bernardo Buontalenti (c. 1531 – 1608), 3 sculptures : The Grotto Grande, Boboli Gardens, Florence (url)
- Giovanni di Antonio Buora (c. 1450 – 1513), 1 sculpture : Virgin and Child with Saints and Donors, Santo Stefano, Venice (url)
- John Bushnell (c. 1630 – 1701), 1 sculpture : Sir Thomas Gresham, Old Bailey, London (url)
- Santino Bussi (1664–1736), 2 sculptures : Decorative plasterwork (detail), Liechtenstein Museum, Vienna (url)

== C ==
- Francesco Cabianca (1665–1737), 1 sculpture : Altar of the Relics, Santa Maria Gloriosa dei Frari, Venice (url)
- Melchiore Caffa (1635–1667), 4 sculptures : Bust of Alexander VII, Metropolitan Museum of Art, New York (url)
- Jean-Jacques Caffiéri (1725–1792), 11 sculptures : Pierre Corneille, Musée du Louvre, Paris (url)
- Philippe Caffiéri (1714–1774), 1 sculpture : The Chariot of Apollo, Wallace Collection, London (url)
- Filippo Calendario (before 1315–1355), 3 sculptures : Capital, Palazzo Ducale, Venice (url)
- Jean-Robert Calloigne (1775–1830), 1 sculpture : Virgin and Child, Groeninge Museum, Bruges (url)
- Bernardino Cametti (1669–1736), 2 sculptures : Annunciation, La Superga, Turin (url)
- Girolamo Campagna (c. 1549 – 1625), 4 sculptures : High Altar, San Giorgio Maggiore, Venice (url)
- Damián Campeny y Estany (1771–1855), 1 sculpture : The Dying Lucretia, Palau de la Llotja, Barcelona (url)
- Alonso Cano (1601–1667), 1 sculpture : The Dead Christ Supported by an Angel, Museo del Prado, Madrid (url)
- Antonio Canova (1757–1822), 32 sculptures : Orpheus and Eurydice, Museo Correr, Venice (url)
- Luigi di Pietro Capponi (1485–1500), 2 sculptures : Two Angels, Musei Vaticani, Vatican (url)
- Caradosso (c. 1452 – 1527), 2 sculptures : Medal of Julius II, Bibliothèque Nationale, Paris (url)
- Matteo Carneri (1592–1673), 1 sculpture : Paolo Veronese, San Sebastiano, Venice (url)
- Jean-Baptiste Carpeaux (1827–1875), 10 sculptures : The Four Corners of the World Supporting the Celestial Sphere, Musée d'Orsay, Paris (url)
- Francesco Carradori (1747–1824), 1 sculpture : Cauno and Bibil, Palazzo Pitti, Florence (url)
- Albert-Ernest Carrier-Belleuse (1824–1887), 2 sculptures : Bacchante, Musée d'Orsay, Paris (url)
- Asmus Jakob Carstens (1754–1798), 2 sculptures : Atropos, Städelsches Kunstinstitut, Frankfurt (url)
- Pierre Cartellier (1757–1831), 2 sculptures : Baron Vivant Denon, Père-Lachaise Cemetery, Paris (url)
- Danese Cattaneo (c. 1509 – 1572), 2 sculptures : Fortuna, Museo Nazionale del Bargello, Florence (url)
- Enrico Causici (1790–1835), 1 sculpture : Daniel Boone Fighting the Indians, Capitol, Washington (url)
- Gian Marco Cavalli (ca. 1454-after 1508), 1 sculpture : Bust of Andrea Mantegna, Mantegna Chapel, Sant'Andrea, Mantua (url)
- Jules Cavelier (1814–1894), 3 sculptures : Penelope Asleep, Château, Dampierre (url)
- it:Giovanni da Cavino (1500–1570), 1 sculpture : Medal of Lorenzino de' Medici, National Gallery of Art, Washington (url)
- Claude-Augustin Cayot (1677–1722), 2 sculptures : Cupid and Psyche, Wallace Collection, London (url)
- Benvenuto Cellini (1500–1571), 47 sculptures : Salt Cellar, Kunsthistorisches Museum, Vienna (url)
- Peter Wolfgang van Ceulen (active 1520s -Rhineland), 1 sculpture : Lamentation, Sint-Salvatorskerk, Bruges (url)
- Sir Francis Legatt Chantrey (1781–1841), 6 sculptures : Bust of Revd. John Horne-Tooke, Fitzwilliam Museum, Cambridge (url)
- Henri Chapu (1833–1891), 1 sculpture : Alexandre Dumas Père, Comédie-Française, Paris (url)
- Alexandre Charpentier (1856–1909), 1 sculpture : The Bakers, Square Scipion, Paris (url)
- Émile Chatrousse (1829–1896), 1 sculpture : The Parisian Woman, Sculpture Depository, Ivry (url)
- Antoine-Denis Chaudet (1763–1810), 3 sculptures : Cupid Presenting a Rose to a Butterfly, Musée du Louvre, Paris (url)
- John Cheere (1709–1787), 2 sculptures : Cain and Abel, Queluz Gardens, Lisbon (url)
- Henry Cheere (1703–1781), 1 sculpture : Monument to Robert, 19th Earl of Kildare, Christ Church Cathedral, Dublin (url)
- Joseph Chinard (1756–1813), 4 sculptures : Bust of Empress Josephine, Musée du Château, Malmaison (url)
- Johann Joseph Christian (1706–1777), 5 sculptures : Angel, Benedictine Abbey, Ottobeuren (url)
- Valerio Cioli (c. 1529 – 1599), 3 sculptures : Fountain of the Dwarf Pietro Barbino, Galleria Palatina (Palazzo Pitti), Florence (url)
- Bernardo Ciuffagni (1385–1457), 1 sculpture : St Matthew, Museo dell'Opera del Duomo, Florence (url)
- Matteo Civitale (1436–1501), 1 sculpture : Bust of a Saint, Szépmûvészeti Múzeum, Budapest (url)
- Camille Claudel (1864–1943), 11 sculptures : Clotho, Musée Rodin, Paris (url)
- Auguste Clésinger (1814–1883), 7 sculptures : Woman Bitten by a Snake (Femme piquée par un serpent), Musée d'Orsay, Paris (url)
- Corneille van Clève (1646–1732), 2 sculptures : Bacchus and Ariadne, Palace of the Legion of Honor, San Francisco (url)
- Clodion (1738–1814), 14 sculptures : Amor and Psyche, Victoria and Albert Museum, London (url)
- Filippo Collino (1737–1801), 1 sculpture : Tomb of Carlo Emanuele III, La Superga, Turin (url)
- Ignazio Collino (1724–1793), 1 sculpture : Sacrificing Vestal, Accademia Albertina, Turin (url)
- Marie-Anne Collot (1748–1821), 2 sculptures : Bust of Falconet, Musée des Beaux-Arts, Nancy (url)
- Michel Colombe (c. 1430 – 1512), 6 sculptures : Tomb of the Children of Charles VIII, Cathedral, Tours (url)
- Alexander Colyn (c. 1526 – 1612), 1 sculpture : Façade of the Otto Heinrich Wing, Castle, Heidelberg (url)
- Charles Henri Joseph Cordier (1827–1905), 1 sculpture : Negro of the Sudan, Musée d'Orsay, Paris (url)
- Nicolas Cordier (1565–1612), 3 sculptures : Gypsy Girl (Zingarella), Galleria Borghese, Rome (url)
- Agostino Cornacchini (1686–1754), 2 sculptures : Equestrian statue of Charlemagne, Basilica di San Pietro, Vatican (url)
- Giovanni delle Corniole (c. 1470 – c. 1516), 1 sculpture : Cameo Portrait of Savonarola, Galleria Palatina (Palazzo Pitti), Florence (url)
- Antonio Corradini (1668–1752), 6 sculptures : Hatchcover, Museo Correr, Venice (url)
- Deodato di Cosma (active around 1300 -Rome), 1 sculpture : Ciborium, Santa Maria in Cosmedin, Rome (url)
- Giovanni di Cosma (active 1290s -Rome), 1 sculpture : Tomb of Cardinal Garcia Gudiel, Santa Maria Maggiore, Rome (url)
- Guillaume Coustou the Elder (1677–1746), 12 sculptures : Bust of Samuel Bernard, Metropolitan Museum of Art, New York (url)
- Guillaume Coustou the Younger (1716–1777), 3 sculptures : Monument to the Dauphin, Cathedral, Sens (url)
- Nicolas Coustou (1658–1733), 5 sculptures : Apollo, Musée du Louvre, Paris (url)
- Antoine Coysevox (1640–1720), 19 sculptures : Tomb of Colbert, Saint-Eustache, Paris (url)
- Cristoforo di Geremia (1456–1476), 4 sculptures : Cardinal Ludovico Trevisan, National Gallery of Art, Washington (url)
- Giuseppe Croff (1810–1869), 3 sculptures : The Veiled Nun (previously attributed to Croff), Corcoran Gallery of Art, Washington (url)
- Louis-Léon Cugnot (1835–1894), 1 sculpture : Petrarch, Hôtel de Païva, Paris (url)

== D ==
- Jacobello dalle Masegne (d. 1409-Emilia), 5 sculptures : Altarpiece, Santa Maria Gloriosa dei Frari, Venice (url)
- Giovanni Dalmata (1440–1510), 2 sculptures : Relief with the Blessing Christ, Musei Vaticani, Vatican (url)
- Jules Dalou (1838–1902), 3 sculptures : Embroideress, Musée du Petit Palais, Paris (url)
- Daniele da Volterra (1509–1566), 3 sculptures : Bust of Michelangelo, Musée du Louvre, Paris (url)
- Johann Heinrich von Dannecker (1758–1841), 7 sculptures : Ariadne on the Panther (front view), Liebieghaus, Frankfurt (url)
- Jean-Pierre Dantan (1800–1869), 3 sculptures : Victor Hugo, Musée Victor Hugo, Paris (url)
- Vincenzo Danti (1530–1576), 11 sculptures : Cosimo as Augustus, Museo Nazionale del Bargello, Florence (url)
- Adolf Daucher (1460–1523), 2 sculptures : Altarpiece of the Fugger Chapel, Church of St Anne, Augsburg (url)
- Hans Daucher (c. 1485 – c. 1538), 2 sculptures : Charles V on Horseback, Tiroler Landesmuseum Ferdinandeum, Innsbruck (url)
- Honoré Daumier (1808–1879), 8 sculptures : Laurent Cunin, Politician (The Angry Man), Musée d'Orsay, Paris (url)
- David d'Angers (1788–1856), 22 sculptures : Condé, Musée du Louvre, Paris (url)
- Josse de Corte (1627–1679), 3 sculptures : High Altar, Santa Maria della Salute, Venice (url)
- Jean-Baptiste Defernex (c. 1729 – 1783), 1 sculpture : Madame Favart, Musée du Louvre, Paris (url)
- Edgar Degas (1834–1917), 10 sculptures : Jephthah's Daughter, Smith College Museum of Art, Northampton (url)
- François-Nicolas Delaistre (1746–1832), 1 sculpture : Bust of the Empress Marie-Louise, Musée des Beaux-Arts, Dijon (url)
- Jean Delemer (1410–1450), 2 sculptures : Albrecht of Bavaria from the Tomb of Isabella of Bourbon, Rijksmuseum, Amsterdam (url)
- Peter Dell the Elder (c. 1490 – 1552), 1 sculpture : Allegory of Faith, Germanisches Nationalmuseum, Nuremberg (url)
- Gustave Deloye (1838–1899), 1 sculpture : Mark the Evangelist, Musée d'Orsay, Paris (url)
- Laurent Delvaux (1696–1778), 3 sculptures : Hercules and the Erymanthian Boar, Royal Museums of Fine Arts of Belgium, Brussels (url)
- Vasily Ivanovich Demut-Malinovsky (1779–1846), 3 sculptures : The Russian Scaevola, State Tretyakov Gallery, Moscow (url)
- Desiderio da Settignano (1428–1464), 12 sculptures : The Christ Child (?), National Gallery of Art, Washington (url)
- François Dieussart (1600–1661), 1 sculpture : Portrait Bust of Pieter Spiering, Rijksmuseum, Amsterdam (url)
- Julien Dillens (1849–1904), 1 sculpture : Everard 't Serclaes Memorial, Place de l'Hôtel-de-Ville, Brussels (url)
- Adam Dircksz (1500), 1 sculpture : Prayer-nut, Rijksmuseum, Amsterdam (url)
- Domenico Dei Cammei (active c. 1500-), 1 sculpture : Ludovico Maria Sforza, Kunsthistorisches Museum, Vienna (url)
- Domenico di Agostino (c. 1350 – 1369), 1 sculpture : The Virgin of the Annunciation, Museo Civico e Diocesano d'Arte Sacra, Montalcino (url)
- Donatello (1376–1466), 201 sculptures : Funeral Monument to the Anti-pope John XXIII, Baptistry, Florence (url)
- Georg Raphael Donner (1693–1741), 9 sculptures : Adoring Angel, Magyar Nemzeti Galéria, Budapest (url)
- Hendrick Douverman (c. 1490 – c. 1543), 3 sculptures : Tree of Jesse, Church of St Nicholas, Kalkar (url)
- Friedrich Drake (1805–1882), 1 sculpture : Monument to King Frederick William III of Prussia, Tiergarten Park, Berlin (url)
- Paul Dubois (1829–1905), 2 sculptures : Florentine Singer, Musée d'Orsay, Paris (url)
- Jacopo del Duca (c. 1520 – 1604), 1 sculpture : Tomb of Elena Savelli, San Giovanni in Laterano, Rome (url)
- Augustin-Alexandre Dumont (1801–1884), 1 sculpture : François I, Musée National du Château, Versailles (url)
- François Dumont (c. 1687 – 1726), 1 sculpture : Tomb of the Demoiselles Bonnier, Musée Fabre, Montpellier (url)
- Giovanni Dupré (1817–1882), 1 sculpture : Abel Defeated, Galleria Palatina (Palazzo Pitti), Florence (url)
- François Duquesnoy (1597–1643), 7 sculptures : Bacchanalia of Putti, Galleria Spada, Rome (url)
- Francisque-Joseph Duret (1804–1865), 4 sculptures : Chactas Meditating on Atala's Tomb, Musée des Beaux-Arts, Lyon (url)
- Jehan Duseigneur (1808–1866), 2 sculptures : Dagobert, Musée National du Château, Versailles (url)

== E ==
- Baldassare degli Embriachi (1390–1409), 1 sculpture : Altarpiece, Certosa, Pavia (url)
- Gregor Erhart (1460/79-1540), 3 sculptures : Christ Child with the Terrestrial Globe, Museum für Kunst und Gewerbe, Hamburg (url)
- Michel Erhart (1469–1522), 4 sculptures : Altarpiece, Benedictine Abbey Church, Blaubeuren (url)
- Antoine Etex (1808–1888), 5 sculptures : Cain and his Children Accursed of God, Chapel of the Salpêtrière Hospital, Paris (url)

== F ==
- Joseph-Hugues Fabisch (1812–1886), 2 sculptures : Beatrice, Musée des Beaux-Arts, Lyon (url)
- Étienne-Maurice Falconet (1716–1791), 13 sculptures : Baigneuse, Musée du Louvre, Paris (url)
- Alexandre Falguière (1831–1900), 1 sculpture : The Winner of the Cockfight, Musée d'Orsay, Paris (url)
- Cosimo Fancelli (c. 1620 – 1688), 1 sculpture : Angel with the Sudarium, Ponte Sant'Angelo, Rome (url)
- Luca Fancelli (ca. 1430-after 1494), 1 sculpture : Fireplace with Portraits of Ludovico II and Federico Gonzaga, Palazzo Ducale, Mantua (url)
- Cosimo Fanzago (1591–1678), 1 sculpture : St Bruno, Certosa di San Martino, Naples (url)
- Lucas Faydherbe (1617–1697), 10 sculptures : Monument to the Berthout Family, Saint Rombout Cathedral, Mechelen (url)
- Vincenzo Felici (1667–1707), 1 sculpture : John Percival, First Earl of Egmont, National Portrait Gallery, London (url)
- István Ferenczy (1792–1856), 4 sculptures : Bust of Ferenc Kazinczy, Magyar Nemzeti Galéria, Budapest (url)
- Gregorio Fernández (c. 1576 – 1636), 7 sculptures : Ecce Homo, Diocesan Museum, Valladolid (url)
- Ercole Ferrata (1610–1686), 3 sculptures : St Agnes on the Pyre, Sant'Agnese in Agone, Rome (url)
- Joseph Anton Feuchtmayer (1696–1770), 3 sculptures : Angel, Pilgrimage church of Our Lady, Neubirnau (url)
- Filarete (1400–1465), 6 sculptures : Equestrian statue of Marcus Aurelius, Staatliche Kunstsammlungen, Dresden (url)
- Giuliano Finelli (1601–1653), 6 sculptures : Bust of Michelangelo Buonarroti the Younger, Casa Buonarroti, Florence (url)
- Johann Martin Fischer (1740–1820), 1 sculpture : Hygieia, Währingerstrasse, Vienna (url)
- Albert Flamen (1647–1717), 1 sculpture : Angel with the Lance, Notre-Dame Cathedral, Paris (url)
- John Flaxman (1755–1826), 3 sculptures : The Fury of Athamas, Ickworth, Suffolk (url)
- Cornelis Floris de Vriendt (1514–1575), 1 sculpture : Christ Carrying the Cross, Cathedral, Tournai (url)
- Peter Flötner (c. 1485 – 1546), 1 sculpture : Design for a wall decoration, Staatliche Museen, Berlin (url)
- Bengt Erland Fogelberg (1786–1854), 2 sculptures : Odin, Nationalmuseum, Stockholm (url)
- Giambattista Foggini (1652–1725), 8 sculptures : Bust of Cardinal Gian Carlo de' Medici, Victoria and Albert Museum, London (url)
- Giovanni Paolo Fonduli (1468–1484), 1 sculpture : Seated Nymph, Wallace Collection, London (url)
- Domenico Fontana (1543–1607), 1 sculpture : Fontana dell'Acqua Felice (Moses Fountain), Piazza di San Bernardo, Rome (url)
- Damian Forment (c. 1480 – 1540), 2 sculptures : Retable of the High Altar (detail), Cathedral, Huesca (url)
- Pietro Francavilla (1548–1615), 3 sculptures : David, Musée du Louvre, Paris (url)
- Jules Franceschi (1825–1893), 1 sculpture : Waking Up, Musée des Beaux-Arts, Nîmes (url)
- Francesco da Sant'Agata (1491–1528), 1 sculpture : Hercules, Wallace Collection, London (url)
- Francesco del Prato (1512–1562), 2 sculptures : Medal of Alessandro de' Medici, British Museum, London (url)
- Francesco di Giorgio (1439–1502), 12 sculptures : Pope Pius II Names Cardinal His Nephew, State Archives, Siena (url)
- Emmanuel Frémiet (1824–1910), 5 sculptures : Pan with Bear Cubs, Musée d'Orsay, Paris (url)
- René Frémin (1672–1744), 2 sculptures : A Companion of Diana, Musée du Louvre, Paris (url)
- Hermann Ernst Freund (1786–1840), 3 sculptures : Girl Picking Flowers, Statens Museum for Kunst, Copenhagen (url)

== G ==
- Antonello Gagini (1478–1536), 1 sculpture : Madonna del Buon Riposo, Museo Nazionale, Palermo (url)
- Pace Gagini (1493–1521), 1 sculpture : Fountain, La Rochefoucauld (Charente) (url)
- Samuil Ivanovich Gal'Berg (1787–1839), 1 sculpture : Bust of the Sculptor Martos, State Tretyakov Gallery, Moscow (url)
- Pietro Paolo Galeotti (1520–1584), 3 sculptures : Bust of Ottavio Farnese, National Gallery of Art, Washington (url)
- Pietro Galli (1804–1877), 1 sculpture : Font, San Paolo fuori le Mura, Rome (url)
- Vittore Gambello (c. 1455 – 1537), 2 sculptures : Seated Hercules Shooting at the Stymphalian Birds, Metropolitan Museum of Art, New York (url)
- Gano di Fazio (active from 1302-before 1318), 3 sculptures : Tomb of Bishop Tommaso d'Andrea (detail), Collegiata, Casole d'Elsa (url)
- Paul Gauguin (1848–1903), 3 sculptures : The Seine at the Pont d'Iéna, Snowy Weather, Musée d'Orsay, Paris (url)
- Nikolaus Gerhaert (1430–1473), 7 sculptures : Christ Child with Grapes, Bayerisches Nationalmuseum, Munich (url)
- Hubert Gerhard (1540–1620), 5 sculptures : The Allegory of Bavaria, Residenzmuseum, Munich (url)
- Théodore Géricault (1791–1824), 1 sculpture : An Officer of the Chasseurs Commanding a Charge, Musée du Louvre, Paris (url)
- Jean-Léon Gérôme (1824–1904), 2 sculptures : Young Greeks at a Cockfight, Musée d'Orsay, Paris (url)
- Antonio Gherardi (1638–1702), 1 sculpture : Stuccowork, San Carlo ai Catinari, Rome (url)
- Lorenzo Ghiberti (1378–1455), 39 sculptures : Sacrifice of Isaac, Museo Nazionale del Bargello, Florence (url)
- Giambologna (c. 1524 – 1608), 53 sculptures : Bacchus, Museo Nazionale del Bargello, Florence (url)
- John Gibson (1768–1852), 4 sculptures : The 'Tinted Venus', Walker Art Gallery, Liverpool (url)
- Bartolomeo Giolfino (c. 1410 – c. 1486), 1 sculpture : Polyptych, Gallerie dell'Accademia, Venice (url)
- Antonio Giorgetti (active 1660s-), 3 sculptures : Angel with the Sponge, Ponte Sant'Angelo, Rome (url)
- Giovanni and Pacio da Firenze (1343–1345), 1 sculpture : Scene from the Life of St Catherine of Alexandria, S. Chiara, Naples (url)
- Giovanni da Campione (1340–1360), 1 sculpture : Tomb of Cangrande della Scala (detail), S. Maria Antica, Verona (url)
- Agostino da Siena (1285–1347), 2 sculptures : Hexagonal font (detail), Santa Maria del Pieve, Arezzo (url)
- Giovanni d'Ambrogio (1382–1418), 2 sculptures : Tomb of Cardinal Philippe d'Alençon, Santa Maria in Trastevere, Rome (url)
- Giovanni di Balduccio (1315–1349), 3 sculptures : Annunciation, Santa Maria del Prato, San Casciano Val di Pesa (url)
- Giovanni di Turino (c. 1384 – c. 1455), 1 sculpture : Madonna of the Magnificat, Sant'Agostino, Siena (url)
- François Girardon (1628–1715), 13 sculptures : Allegorical Figure, Metropolitan Museum of Art, New York (url)
- Gislebertus (1100–1150), 11 sculptures : Main portal, Cathedral of Saint-Lazare, Autun (url)
- Giovanni Giuliani (1663–1744), 6 sculptures : Wooden base for a tabletop, Liechtenstein Museum, Vienna (url)
- Giulio Romano (1499–1546), 1 sculpture : View of the Sala dei Giganti (south and west walls), Sala dei Giganti, Palazzo del Tè, Mantua (url)
- Antonio Giusti (1479–1519), 1 sculpture : Head of St Peter, Musée du Louvre, Paris (url)
- Fyodor Gordeyevich Gordeyev (1744–1810), 1 sculpture : Prometheus, State Russian Museum, St. Petersburg (url)
- Goro di Gregorio (1300–1334), 4 sculptures : Tomb of St Cerbone, Duomo, Massa Marittima (url)
- Jean Goujon (c. 1510 – c. 1565), 19 sculptures : Façade of the Cour Carrée (wing Lescot), Palais du Louvre, Paris (url)
- Erasmus Grasser (c. 1450 – c. 1518), 2 sculptures : Monument of Doctor Ulrich Aresinger, Peterskirche, Munich (url)
- El Greco (1541–1614), 6 sculptures : The Dormition of the Virgin, Holy Cathedral of the Dormition of the Virgin, Ermoupolis, Syros (url)
- Gabriel Grupello (1644–1730), 1 sculpture : Diana and Narcissus, Royal Museums of Fine Arts of Belgium, Brussels (url)
- Johann Meinrad Guggenbichler (1649–1723), 1 sculpture : St Joseph and the Christ Child, Private collection (url)
- Fra Guglielmo (c. 1235 – c. 1310), 2 sculptures : Pulpit, San Giovanni Fuorcivitas, Pistoia (url)
- Domenico Guidi (1625–1701), 2 sculptures : Fame Reviving the History of Louis XIV, Neptune Fountain, Versailles (url)
- Simon Guillain (1581–1658), 5 sculptures : Louis XIV between Louis XIII and Anne of Austria, Musée du Louvre, Paris (url)
- Albert Guillaume (1822–1905), 1 sculpture : Cenotaph of the Gracchi, Musée d'Orsay, Paris (url)
- Ignaz Günther (1725–1775), 7 sculptures : Adoring Angel, Liebieghaus, Frankfurt (url)

== H ==
- Karl Friedrich Hagemann (1773–1806), 1 sculpture : Immanuel Kant, Kunsthalle, Hamburg (url)
- Nikolaus Haguenauer (1493–1526), 1 sculpture : Isenheim Altarpiece (third view), Musée d'Unterlinden, Colmar (url)
- Paul Heermann (1673–1732), 1 sculpture : King Augustus II of Poland, Gemäldegalerie, Dresden (url)
- Jerónimo Hernández Estrada (1540–1586), 1 sculpture : The Resurrected Christ, Quinta Augustia, Seville (url)
- Jean-Antoine Houdon (1741–1828), 27 sculptures : Bust of Anne-Ange Houdon, Museum of Fine Arts, Houston (url)
- Charles Hoyau (c. 1620 – c. 1644), 1 sculpture : St Cecilia, Cathedral, Le Mans (url)
- William Morris Hunt (1824–1879), 1 sculpture : The Horses of Anahita or The Flight of Night, Metropolitan Museum of Art, New York (url)

== I ==
- Isaia da Pisa (1447–1464), 2 sculptures : Reliquary Tabernacle of the Head of St Andrew, Grotte Vaticane, Rome (url)
- Chauncey Bradley Ives (1810–1894), 2 sculptures : Pandora, Museum of Fine Arts, Boston (url)

== J ==
- Niels Hansen Jacobsen (1861–1941), 1 sculpture : The Troll Who Can Smell Christian Blood, Ny Carlsberg Glyptotek, Copenhagen (url)
- Jacopino da Tradate (1401–1440), 1 sculpture : Pope Martin V, Duomo, Milan (url)
- Jacopo Della Pila (1472–1502), 1 sculpture : Tomb of Tommaso Brancaccio, San Domenico Maggiore, Naples (url)
- Mathieu Jacquet (ca. 1545-after 1611), 1 sculpture : Henry IV, Château, Fontainebleau (url)
- Georges Jacquot (1794–1874), 1 sculpture : Paris and Helena, Musée des Beaux-Arts, Nancy (url)
- Jean-Louis Jaley (1802–1866), 1 sculpture : Strength, Musée d'Orsay, Paris (url)
- Jean de Liège (1361–1381), 4 sculptures : Head of Bonne de France, Museum Mayer van den Bergh, Antwerp (url)
- Jens Adolf Jerichau (1818–1883), 1 sculpture : Slave, Kunstmuseum, Randers (url)
- Esteban Jordan (c. 1529 – c. 1598), 2 sculptures : Main Altar, Church of St Mary Magdalen, Valladolid (url)
- Samuel Joseph (1791–1850), 1 sculpture : Monument to Wilberforce (detail), Westminster Abbey, London (url)
- Pierre Julien (1731–1804), 3 sculptures : Amalthaea (Girl Tending a Goat), Musée du Louvre, Paris (url)
- Juan de Juni (1506–1577), 8 sculptures : Ecce Homo, Diocesan Museum, Valladolid (url)
- Jean Juste (1485–1549), 2 sculptures : Monument of Louis XII and Anne of Brittany, Abbey Church, Saint-Denis (url)

== K ==
- Heinrich Keller (1778–1862), 1 sculpture : Atalanta, Kunsthaus, Zurich (url)
- Leonhard Kern (1588–1662), 1 sculpture : Diana, Victoria and Albert Museum, London (url)
- Guillielmus Kerricx (1652–1719), 1 sculpture : Maximilian Emmanuel of Bavaria, Koninklijk Museum voor Schone Kunsten, Antwerp (url)
- Willem Ignatius Kerricx (1682–1745), 2 sculptures : Confessionals, O.-L. Vrouwekathedraal, Antwerp (url)
- Hendrick de Keyser (1565–1621), 7 sculptures : Portrait of Vincent Coster, Rijksmuseum, Amsterdam (url)
- Leopold Kiesling (1770–1827), 1 sculpture : Mars, Venus, and Cupid, Österreichische Galerie, Vienna (url)
- August Kiss (1802–1865), 1 sculpture : Amazon, Altes Museum, Berlin (url)
- Hans Klocker (1478–1500), 1 sculpture : St Stephen, The Hermitage, St. Petersburg (url)
- Pyotr Karlovich Klodt (1805–1867), 11 sculptures : Horse Tamer, Anichkov Bridge, St. Petersburg (url)
- Mikhail Ivanovich Kozlovsky (1753–1802), 8 sculptures : The Vigil of Alexander the Great, State Russian Museum, St. Petersburg (url)
- Adam Kraft (1455/60–1508/09), 3 sculptures : Entombment, Holzschuher Kapelle, S. Lorenz, Nuremberg (url)
- Hans Krumper (c. 1570 – 1634), 3 sculptures : Justice, Residenz, Munich (url)

== L ==
- Niccolò di Piero Lamberti (1370–1451), 3 sculptures : St Mark, Museo dell'Opera del Duomo, Florence (url)
- Piero di Niccolò Lamberti (c. 1393 – 1435), 2 sculptures : Monument to Doge Tommaso Mocenigo, Basilica dei Santi Giovanni e Paolo, Venice (url)
- Taddeo Landini (c. 1550 – 1596), 1 sculpture : Fontana delle Tartarughe, Piazza Mattei, Rome (url)
- Giorgio Lascaris (before 1496–1531), 2 sculptures : Virgin and Child, Santa Maria dei Miracoli, Venice (url)
- Francesco Laurana (c. 1430 – 1502), 9 sculptures : Triumphal Arch of Alfonso I (detail), Castelnuovo, Naples (url)
- Pierre Le Gros the Younger (1666–1719), 6 sculptures : St Aloyzius Gonzaga in Glory, Sant'Ignazio, Rome (url)
- Robert Le Lorrain (1666–1743), 5 sculptures : Bust of Thetis, Liechtenstein Museum, Vienna (url)
- Pierre Lepautre II (c. 1659 – 1744), 1 sculpture : Aeneas Carrying Anchises from Troy, Tuileries Gardens, Paris (url)
- Roullant Le Roux (active 1510s-), 3 sculptures : Tomb of the Amboise Cardinals, Cathedral, Rouen (url)
- Félix Lecomte (1737–1817), 5 sculptures : Astronomy and Geography, National Trust, Waddesdon Manor (url)
- Hans Leinberger (1510–1530), 1 sculpture : Virgin and Child, Parish church, Moosburg (Bavaria) (url)
- François-Frédéric Lemot (1772–1827), 1 sculpture : Equestrian Statue of Henri IV, Pont-Neuf, Paris (url)
- Jean-Baptiste Lemoyne I (1679–1731), 1 sculpture : The Death of Hippolytus, Musée du Louvre, Paris (url)
- Jean-Baptiste Lemoyne (1704–1778), 9 sculptures : The Baptism of Christ, Saint-Roch, Paris (url)
- Jean-Louis Lemoyne (1665–1755), 3 sculptures : A Companion of Diana, National Gallery of Art, Washington (url)
- Adam Lenckhardt (1610–1661), 1 sculpture : St Sebastian, Liechtenstein Museum, Vienna (url)
- Leonardo da Vinci (1452–1519), 5 sculptures : The Baptism of Christ (detail), Galleria degli Uffizi, Florence (url)
- Leone Leoni (1509–1590), 5 sculptures : The Emperor Charles V Restraining Fury, Museo del Prado, Madrid (url)
- Pompeo Leoni (1533–1608), 1 sculpture : Tomb of Charles V, Monasterio de San Lorenzo, El Escorial (url)
- Vaclav Levy (1820–1870), 1 sculpture : Fantastic Heads, Libechov, Czech Republic (url)
- Antonio Francisco Lisboa (1738–1814), 3 sculptures : The Prophet Daniel, Sanctuary of Congonhas do Campo, Brazil (url)
- Jacopo Lixignolo (active 1460-), 1 sculpture : Borso d'Este, Musei Civici d'Arte Antica, Ferrara (url)
- Alfonso Lombardi (1497–1537), 1 sculpture : Death of the Virgin, Santa Maria della Vita, Bologna (url)
- Antonio Lombardo (c. 1458 – 1516), 4 sculptures : The Birth of Athena at the Forge of Vulcan, The Hermitage, St. Petersburg (url)
- Pietro Lombardo (c. 1435 – 1515), 8 sculptures : Angel, San Giobbe, Venice (url)
- Tullio Lombardo (c. 1460 – 1532), 10 sculptures : Monument of Andrea Vendramin, Basilica dei Santi Giovanni e Paolo, Venice (url)
- Lorenzetto (1490–1541), 2 sculptures : Christ and the Woman Taken in Adultery, Santa Maria del Popolo, Rome (url)
- Battista di Domenico Lorenzi (1527–1592), 2 sculptures : Alpheus and Arethusa, Metropolitan Museum of Art, New York (url)
- Jean-Robert-Nicolas Lucas de Montigny (1747–1810), 1 sculpture : Portrait Bust of One of the Montgolfier Brothers, Private collection (url)

== M ==
- Joaquim Machado de Castro (1736–1822), 1 sculpture : Equestrian Statue of José I of Portugal, Praça do Comércio, Lisbon (url)
- Stefano Maderno (c. 1576 – 1636), 1 sculpture : St Cecilia, Santa Cecilia in Trastevere, Rome (url)
- Giovanni Angelo Del Maino (c. 1475 – c. 1536), 4 sculptures : The Marriage of the Virgin, Museo Poldi Pezzoli, Milan (url)
- Lorenzo Maitani (c. 1255 – 1330), 18 sculptures : Façade of the Cathedral, Duomo, Orvieto (url)
- Cristoforo Mantegazza (1464–1482), 3 sculptures : Expulsion from the Garden, Certosa, Pavia (url)
- Andrea Mantegna (1430–1506), 2 sculptures : The Adoration of the Shepherds, Metropolitan Museum of Art, New York (url)
- Camillo Mariani (c. 1565 – 1611), 1 sculpture : St Catherine of Alexandria, San Bernardo alle Terme, Rome (url)
- Joseph Charles Marin (1759–1834), 1 sculpture : Head of a Bacchante, Victoria and Albert Museum, London (url)
- Orazio Marinali (1643–1720), 4 sculptures : Boy in a Hat, Fondazione Querini Stampalia, Venice (url)
- Charles Marochetti (1805–1867), 1 sculpture : Mary Magdalen Exalted by Angels, Church of Madeleine, Paris (url)
- Daniel Marot (1662–1752), 1 sculpture : Design for a Ceiling, The Hermitage, St. Petersburg (url)
- Gaspard and Balthazard Marsy (1624–1681), 1 sculpture : The Horses of the Sun, Apollo Grotto, Versailles (url)
- Ivan Petrovich Martos (1754–1835), 7 sculptures : Moses Striking a Rock to Bring forth Water, State Russian Museum, St. Petersburg (url)
- Maso di Bartolommeo (1406-ca. 1456), 1 sculpture : Bronze Doors of the New Sacristy, Duomo, Florence (url)
- Antoine Masson (1745–1807), 1 sculpture : Monument to Jean-Jacques Rousseau, Musée d'Orsay, Paris (url)
- Quentin Matsys (1466–1530), 1 sculpture : St Anne Altarpiece, Royal Museums of Fine Arts of Belgium, Brussels (url)
- Master Arnt of Kalkar (1490–1492), 1 sculpture : Lamentation of Christ with Kneeling Donor, Rijksmuseum, Amsterdam (url)
- Master Bertram (d.1415), 1 sculpture : St Peter (Grabow) Altarpiece, Kunsthalle, Hamburg (url)
- Master HL (active c. 1515-Upper Rhine), 3 sculptures : Coronation of the Virgin, Parish church, Niederrotweil (Kaiserstuhl) (url)
- Master IP (active 1520s-), 1 sculpture : Adam and Eve, Schloss Friedenstein, Gotha (url)
- Master Mateo (1161–1217), 4 sculptures : Portico de la Gloria, Cathedral, Santiago de Compostela (url)
- Master of Cabestany (1130–1180), 7 sculptures : Tympanum, Parish Church of Notre-Dame, Cabestany (url)
- Master of Elsloo (1510–1530), 1 sculpture : St Anne with the Virgin and Child, Rijksmuseum, Amsterdam (url)
- Master of the Fontainebleau School (end of the 16th century-), 1 sculpture : Mythological Allegory, Musée du Louvre, Paris (url)
- Master of the Mascoli Altar (1425–1450), 1 sculpture : Madonna, Child and Saints, Mascoli Chapel, San Marco, Venice (url)
- Master Paul of Lõcse (1500–1520), 8 sculptures : High Altarpiece of St. James, Basilica of St. James, Levoča (url)
- Simon Mazière (1648-after 1721), 1 sculpture : The Raising of the Cross, Cathedral, Chartres (url)
- Giuseppe Maria Mazza (1653–1741), 2 sculptures : Death of St Dominic, SS. Giovanni e Paolo, Venice (url)
- Guido Mazzoni (c. 1450 – 1518), 8 sculptures : Adoration of the Child, Duomo, Modena (url)
- Giuseppe Mazzuoli (1644–1725) (1643–1725), 3 sculptures : The Death of Adonis, The Hermitage, St. Petersburg (url)
- Conrad Meit (c. 1480 – 1550), 9 sculptures : Philibert of Savoy, British Museum, London (url)
- Pedro de Mena (1628–1688), 1 sculpture : St Francis of Assisi, Sacristy of the Cathedral, Toledo (url)
- Antonin Mercié (1845–1916), 2 sculptures : David, Musée d'Orsay, Paris (url)
- Giovanni Merliano (c. 1488 – 1558), 3 sculptures : Monument of Don Pedro of Toledo, San Giacomo degli Spagnuoli, Naples (url) The Web Gallery gives his name incorrectly as "Marigliano".
- Franz Xaver Messerschmidt (1736–1783), 10 sculptures : Character Head: The Gentle, Quiet Sleep, Szépmûvészeti Múzeum, Budapest (url)
- Michelangelo (1475–1564), 107 sculptures : Madonna of the Stairs, Casa Buonarroti, Florence (url)
- Michele da Firenze (active c. 1404–1443), 2 sculptures : Scenes from the Life of Christ, Pellegrini Chapel, Sant'Anastasia, Verona (url)
- Michele di Giovanni da Fiesole (c. 1418 – c. 1458), 7 sculptures : Fireplace, Palazzo Ducale, Urbino (url)
- Michelozzo (1396–1472), 10 sculptures : Funeral Monument to the Anti-pope John XXIII, Baptistry, Florence (url)
- Pierre-Philippe Mignot (1715–1770), 1 sculpture : A Sleepeing Bacchante, Birmingham Museum and Art Gallery, Birmingham (url)
- François-Dominique-Aimé Milhomme (1758–1823), 1 sculpture : Sorrow, Tomb of Pierre Gareau, Père-Lachaise Cemetery, Paris (url)
- Mino da Fiesole (1430–1484), 12 sculptures : Alfonso of Aragon, Musée du Louvre, Paris (url)
- Ottavio Miseroni (1567–1624), 2 sculptures : Bowl in the Form of a Lion Skin, Kunsthistorisches Museum, Vienna (url)
- Francesco Mochi (1580–1654), 8 sculptures : Angel of Annunciation, Museo dell'Opera del Duomo, Orvieto (url)
- Moderno (1467–1528), 1 sculpture : The Infant Hercules Strangling Two Serpents, Metropolitan Museum of Art, New York (url)
- Antonin Moine (1796–1849), 1 sculpture : History and Fame, Palais Bourbon, Paris (url)
- Jean-Guillaume Moitte (1746–1810), 1 sculpture : Cassini, Observatoire, Paris (url)
- Johann Peter Molin (1814–1873), 2 sculptures : Fountain, Karl XII Square, Stockholm (url)
- Pierre Etienne Monnot (1657–1733), 4 sculptures : Andromeda and the Sea Monster, Metropolitan Museum of Art, New York (url)
- Juan Martínez Montañés (1568–1649), 5 sculptures : Bust on a Reliquiary [sic], Szépmûvészeti Múzeum, Budapest (url)
- Antonio Montauti (ca. 1685-after 1740), 1 sculpture : Pietà, Corsini Chapel, San Giovanni in Laterano, Rome (url)
- Baccio da Montelupo (1469–1535), 1 sculpture : St Damian, Sagrestia Nuova, San Lorenzo, Florence (url)
- Giovanni Angelo Montorsoli (1507–1563), 3 sculptures : Drunken Satyr, Art Museum, Saint Louis (url)
- Francesco Moratti (c. 1680 – c. 1719), 1 sculpture : St Simon, San Giovanni in Laterano, Rome (url)
- Mathurin Moreau (1822–1912), 1 sculpture : Woman Spinning, Senate, Paris (url)
- Giovan Maria Morlaiter (1699–1781), 5 sculptures : St Dominic Altar, Santa Maria del Rosario (Gesuati), Venice (url)
- Francesco Mosca (c. 1546 – 1578), 1 sculpture : Diana and Actaeon, Museo Nazionale del Bargello, Florence (url)
- Hans Multscher (c. 1400 – 1467), 4 sculptures : St George and St John the Evangelist, Cathedral, Ulm (url)
- Alexander Munro (1825–1871), 2 sculptures : Paolo and Francesca, Birmingham Museum and Art Gallery, Birmingham (url)

== N ==
- Nanni di Banco (1363–1421), 8 sculptures : Porta della Mandorla, Duomo, Florence (url)
- Nanni di Bartolo (1419–1435), 2 sculptures : Brenzoni Monument, S. Fermo Maggiore, Verona (url)
- Charles-François Lebœuf, known as "Nanteuil" (1792–1865), 1 sculpture : The Virgin and Child with Adoring Angels, Notre-Dame-de-Lorette, Paris (url)
- Neroccio di Bartolomeo de' Landi (1447–1500), 1 sculpture : Annunciation, Yale University Art Gallery, New Haven (url)
- Niccolò (active c. 1120–1150), 4 sculptures : Façade, San Zeno, Verona (url)
- Niccolò dell'Arca (1462–1494), 5 sculptures : Tomb of St Dominic: Angel Holding a Candle, San Domenico, Bologna (url)
- Andrea Nofri (1388-ca. 1455), 1 sculpture : Tomb of King Ladislas, S. Giovanni a Carbonara, Naples (url)
- Joseph Nollekens (1737–1823), 3 sculptures : Monument to Sir Thomas and Lady Salusbury, Great Offley Church, Hertfordshire (url)
- Bernt Notke (c. 1440 – 1509), 2 sculptures : St George and the Dragon, Storkyrkan, Stockholm (url)
- Gaspar Núñez Delgado (c. 1555 – 1606), 1 sculpture : Crucifix, Museum of Art, Indianapolis (url)

== O ==
- Giuseppe Obici (1807–1878), 3 sculptures : St Paul, San Paolo fuori le Mura, Rome (url)
- Pietro Oderisi (active c. 1260–1280), 2 sculptures : Tomb of Pope Clement IV, San Francesco, Viterbo (url)
- Oderisius of Benevento (1119–1150), 1 sculpture : Door of the west portal, Cathedral, Troia (url)
- Giovanni Domenico Olivieri (1708–1762), 1 sculpture : The Emperor Honorio, Palacio Real, Madrid (url)
- Pier Paolo Olivieri (1551–1599), 2 sculptures : Adoration of the Magi, Caetani Chapel, Santa Pudenziata, Rome (url)
- Orcagna (1320–1368), 6 sculptures : The Expulsion of the Duke of Athens, Palazzo Vecchio, Florence (url)
- Bartolomé Ordóñez (c. 1490 – 1520), 3 sculptures : Tomb of Don Felipe and Doña Juana, Capilla Real, Cathedral, Granada (url)
- Boris Orlovsky (1792–1837), 2 sculptures : Monument of Kutuzov, St. Petersburg (url)
- Tommaso Orsolino (1587–1675), 1 sculpture : The Nativity, Chiesa del Gesù, Genoa (url)
- Auguste Ottin (1811–1890), 3 sculptures : Polyphemus Surprising Acis and Galatea, Luxembourg Gardens, Paris (url)
- Lorenzo Ottoni (1658–1736), 1 sculpture : Bust of the Duchess of Mirandola, Palazzo Ducale, Mantua (url)
- Eugène André Oudiné (1810–1887), 2 sculptures : Christ between Two Angels and the Four Evangelists, Church, Gennevilliers (url)

== P ==
- Vincenzo Pacetti (1746–1820), 3 sculptures : Apollo, Galleria Borghese, Rome (url)
- Michael Pacher (c. 1435 – 1498), 3 sculptures : Annunciation, Alte Pinakothek, Munich (url)
- Augustin Pajou (1730–1809), 7 sculptures : Bust of Madame du Barry, Musée du Louvre, Paris (url)
- Guillielmus Paludanus (1530–1579), 2 sculptures : The Garden of Eden or Love, Royal Museums of Fine Arts of Belgium, Brussels (url)
- Luigi Pampaloni (1791–1847), 3 sculptures : Arnolfo di Cambio, Piazza del Duomo, Florence (url)
- Paolo Romano (1410–1470), 4 sculptures : Four reliefs with the trials of Saint Peter, Musei Vaticani, Vatican (url)
- Giovanni Antonio Paracca (c. 1550 – c. 1584), 2 sculptures : Statue of Sixtus V, Santa Maria Maggiore, Rome (url)
- Peter Parler (1330–1399), 6 sculptures : Head of Charles IV, St Vitus Cathedral, Prague (url)
- Filippo Parodi (1630–1702), 9 sculptures : Immaculate Conception, Santa Maria della Cella, Genoa (url)
- Pasquino da Montepulciano (c. 1425 – 1485), 3 sculptures : Frieze of the portal (detail), San Domenico, Urbino (url)
- Matteo de' Pasti (c. 1420 – c. 1468), 9 sculptures : Guarino Guarini da Verona, Münzkabinett, Staatliche Museen, Berlin (url)
- Pastorino de' Pastorini (c. 1508 – 1592), 1 sculpture : Portrait Medal of Titian, British Museum, London (url)
- Edward Pearce (c. 1675 – 1695), 1 sculpture : Bust of Sir Christopher Wren, Ashmolean Museum, Oxford (url)
- Manuel Pereyra (1588–1683), 2 sculptures : San Bruno, Museo de la Academia de San Fernando, Madrid (url)
- Balthasar Permoser (1651–1732), 5 sculptures : Apotheosis of Prince Eugene, Österreichische Galerie, Vienna (url)
- Jean-Joseph Perraud (1819–1876), 1 sculpture : Despair, Musée d'Orsay, Paris (url)
- Baldassare Peruzzi (1481–1536), 1 sculpture : Ceiling decoration (Volta Dorata), Palazzo della Cancellaria, Rome (url)
- Jörg Petel (1601–1634), 3 sculptures : Ecce Homo, Cathedral, Augsburg (url)
- Giuseppe Piamontini (1664–1742), 4 sculptures : Bust of a Woman, Palazzo Pitti, Florence (url)
- Giacomo Piazzetta (1640–1705), 2 sculptures : Choir stall, Basilica dei Santi Giovanni e Paolo, Venice (url)
- Pierino da Vinci (1530–1553), 2 sculptures : Cosimo I as Patron of Pisa, Musei Vaticani, Vatican (url)
- Pietro da Fano (1452–1464), 1 sculpture : Giovanna Dandolo, Wife of Pasquale Malipiero, National Gallery of Art, Washington (url)
- Pietro di Giovanni Tedesco (1386–1402), 2 sculptures : Madonna of the Roses, Orsanmichele, Florence (url)
- Jean-Baptiste Pigalle (1714–1785), 16 sculptures : Thomas-Aignan Desfriches, Musée des Beaux-Arts, Orléans (url)
- Anton Pilgram (c. 1460 – 1515), 1 sculpture : Self-portrait, St Stephen's Cathedral, Vienna (url)
- Germain Pilon (1525/30-1590), 15 sculptures : Charles IX of France, Wallace Collection, London (url)
- Valerio Pilon (1929-2020), 1 sculpture : Santa Monica, Chiesa S.Maria del Suffragio, Milan
- José Piquer y Duart (1806–1871), 1 sculpture : The Penitent Saint Jerome, Museo del Prado, Madrid (url)
- Pisanello (1395–1455), 22 sculptures : Apparition of the Virgin to Sts Anthony Abbot and George, National Gallery, London (url)
- Andrea Pisano (1270–1348), 28 sculptures : Weaver, Campanile, Duomo, Florence (url)
- Giovanni Pisano (1245–1314), 34 sculptures : Pulpit, Sant'Andrea, Pistoia (url)
- Nicola Pisano (1220–1287), 15 sculptures : Pulpit, Baptistry, Pisa (url)
- Nino Pisano (active c. 1349-Pisa), 6 sculptures : Monument to the Doge Marco Corner, Basilica dei Santi Giovanni e Paolo, Venice (url)
- Domenico Poggini (1520–1590), 2 sculptures : Bust of Francesco I de' Medici, Galleria degli Uffizi, Florence (url)
- Claude Poirier (c. 1656 – 1729), 1 sculpture : Angel with the Nails, Notre-Dame Cathedral, Paris (url)
- Antonio del Pollaiuolo (1433–1498), 11 sculptures : Apollo and Daphne, National Gallery, London (url)
- Joseph-Michel-Ange Pollet (1814–1870), 3 sculptures : The Night, Museo Nacional de Arte Decorativo, Buenos Aires (url)
- Jacquiot Ponce (1527–1570), 2 sculptures : Tomb of Blondel de Rocquencourt, Musée du Louvre, Paris (url)
- Giacomo Antonio Ponsonelli (1654–1735), 1 sculpture : Bust of Marcantonio Grillo, Albergo dei Poveri, Genoa (url)
- Flaminio Ponzio (1559–1613), 2 sculptures : Tomb of Clement VIII, Cappella Paolina, Santa Maria Maggiore, Rome (url)
- Antonio della Porta, known as "Tamagnino" (1489–1519), 1 sculpture : Tomb of Raoul de Lannoy, Church, Folleville (Somme) (url)
- Giuseppe Porta (1520–1575), 3 sculptures : Fontanina, Piazza Campitelli, Rome (url)
- Guglielmo della Porta (c. 1490 – 1577), 5 sculptures : Altar, Chapel of Peter and Paul, Cathedral, Genoa (url)
- Hiram Powers (1805–1873), 4 sculptures : Bust of General Andrew Jackson, Metropolitan Museum of Art, New York (url)
- Andrea Pozzo (1642–1709), 2 sculptures : Altar of St Ignatius Loyola, Il Gesù, Rome (url)
- James Pradier (1792–1852), 8 sculptures : The Ironer (La Repasseuse), Musée d'Art et d'Histoire, Geneva (url)
- Antoine-Augustin Préault (1809–1879), 5 sculptures : Clémence Isaure, Jardin du Luxembourg, Paris (url)
- Francesco Primaticcio (1504–1570), 4 sculptures : Ulysses and Penelope, Toledo Museum of Art, Toledo, Ohio (url)
- Ivan Prokof'yevich Prokof'Yev (1758–1828), 5 sculptures : Actaeon Pursued by Dogs, State Tretyakov Gallery, Moscow (url)
- Pierre Puget (1620–1694), 29 sculptures : Vessel Firing a Salvo, Musée des Beaux-Arts, Marseille (url)

== Q ==
- Francesco Queirolo (1704–1762), 1 sculpture : Release from Deception, Santa Maria della Pietà dei Sangro, Naples (url)
- Artus Quellinus the Elder (1609–1668), 6 sculptures : Luis de Benavides, Koninklijk Museum voor Schone Kunsten, Antwerp (url)
- Artus Quellinus II (1625–1700), 6 sculptures : Tomb of Bishop Marius Ambrose Capello, O.-L. Vrouwekathedraal, Antwerp (url)
- Jacopo della Quercia (1367–1438), 22 sculptures : Main Portal, San Petronio, Bologna (url)

== R ==
- Antonio Raggi (1624–1686), 5 sculptures : Angel with the Column, Ponte Sant'Angelo, Rome (url)
- Nicolas-Bernard Raggi (1790–1862), 2 sculptures : Henri IV, Place Royale, Pau (url)
- Claude Ramey (1754–1838), 1 sculpture : Napoleon I in his Coronation Costume, Musée du Louvre, Paris (url)
- Carlo Bartolomeo Rastrelli (c. 1675 – 1744), 1 sculpture : Equestrian Statue of Peter the Great, St. Petersburg (url)
- Christian Daniel Rauch (1777–1857), 9 sculptures : Blücher, Victor of Waterloo, Unter den Linden, Berlin (url)
- Reiner de Huy (1150), 3 sculptures : Baptismal font, Saint-Barthélemy, Liège (url)
- Pierre-Auguste Renoir (1841–1919), 2 sculptures : Mademoiselle Romaine Lacaux, Museum of Art, Cleveland (url)
- Il Riccio (c. 1460 – 1532), 9 sculptures : Arion, Musée du Louvre, Paris (url)
- Ligier Richier (c. 1500 – 1567), 1 sculpture : Tomb of René de Châlons, St. Étienne, Bar-le-Duc (url)
- Tilman Riemenschneider (c. 1460 – 1531), 10 sculptures : Mary Magdalen with two Angels, Bayerisches Nationalmuseum, Munich (url)
- Ernst Friedrich August Rietschel (1804–1861), 1 sculpture : Bust of Felix Mendelssohn-Bartholdy, Staatsbibliothek, Berlin (url)
- Francesco Righetti (1749–1819), 2 sculptures : Castor and Pollux, Private collection (url)
- Théodore Rivière (1857–1912), 1 sculpture : Salammbô and Matho, Musée d'Orsay, Paris (url)
- Antonio Rizzo (c. 1430 – c. 1499), 11 sculptures : Adam, Palazzo Ducale, Venice (url)
- Andrea della Robbia (1435–1525), 31 sculptures : Annunciation, Chiesa Maggiore, La Verna (url)
- Francesco della Robbia (1477–1527), 3 sculptures : Christ in Sepulchre, Santa Maria degli Angeli, La Verna (url)
- Giovanni della Robbia (1469–1529), 11 sculptures : Lavabo, Sacresty, Santa Maria Novella, Florence (url)
- Girolamo della Robbia (1488–1566), 1 sculpture : Christ Carrying the Cross, Certosa del Galluzzo, Florence (url)
- Luca della Robbia (1399–1482), 68 sculptures : Cantoria, Museo dell'Opera del Duomo, Florence (url)
- Luca della Robbia (1399–1482), 5 sculptures : Adoration of the Shepherds, San Lorenzo, Bibbiena (Arezzo) (url)
- Nicola Roccatagliata (before 1593–1636), 3 sculptures : Bacchus, Victoria and Albert Museum, London (url)
- Auguste Rodin (1840–1917), 63 sculptures : The Gates of Hell, Musée Rodin, Paris (url)
- John Roettiers (1631–1703), 1 sculpture : Portrait Medal of John Maitland, Private collection (url)
- Randolph Rogers (1825–1892), 1 sculpture : Nydia, Museum of Fine Arts, Boston (url)
- Pedro Roldán (1624–1699), 1 sculpture : The Entombment (detail), Hospital de la Caridad, Seville (url)
- Giovanni Cristoforo Romano (c. 1465 – 1512), 13 sculptures : Beatrice d'Este, Musée du Louvre, Paris (url)
- Jan van Roome (1498–1521), 1 sculpture : Tomb of Margaret of Austria, Monastère Royal de Brou, Bourg-en-Bresse (url)
- Domenico Rosselli (c. 1439 – c. 1497), 1 sculpture : Portrait of Battista Sforza, Museo Civico, Pesaro (url)
- Antonio Rossellino (1427–1479), 10 sculptures : Birth of Jesus, Santa Anna dei Lombardi, Monteoliveto, Naples (url)
- Bernardo Rossellino (1409–1464), 4 sculptures : Tomb of Leonardo Bruni, Santa Croce, Florence (url)
- Properzia de' Rossi (1491–1530), 1 sculpture : Joseph and Potiphar's Wife, Museo de San Petronio, Bologna (url)
- Vincenzo de' Rossi (1525–1587), 3 sculptures : Hercules and Diomedes, Palazzo Vecchio, Florence (url)
- Rosso Fiorentino (1494–1541), 2 sculptures : Assumption of the Virgin, Santissima Annunziata, Florence (url)
- Medardo Rosso (1858–1928), 1 sculpture : Ecce Puer (Impression of a Child), Musée d'Orsay, Paris (url)
- Louis-François Roubiliac (1705–1762), 5 sculptures : Bust of Alexander Pope, Victoria and Albert Museum, London (url)
- François Rude (1784–1855), 8 sculptures : Neapolitan Fisherboy Playing with a Tortoise, Musée du Louvre, Paris (url)
- Camillo Rusconi (1658–1728), 7 sculptures : St Andrew, San Giovanni in Laterano, Rome (url)
- William Rush (1756–1833), 1 sculpture : Bust of Benjamin Franklin, Yale University, New Haven (url)
- Giovanni Francesco Rustici (1474–1554), 3 sculptures : Noli me tangere, Museo Nazionale del Bargello, Florence (url)
- Henri-Joseph Ruxthiel (1775–1837), 2 sculptures : Elfriede Clarke de Feltre, Musée des Beaux-Arts, Nantes (url)
- John Michael Rysbrack (1694–1770), 4 sculptures : Monument to Sir John Dutton, Shernborne, Dorset (url)

== S ==
- Augustus Saint-Gaudens (1848–1907), 1 sculpture : Diana, Metropolitan Museum of Art, New York (url)
- Pietro di Lorenzo da Salò (1535-c. 1562), 1 sculpture : St George Fighting the Dragon, Scuola di San Giorgio degli Schiavoni, Venice (url)
- Nicola Salvi (1697–1751), 4 sculptures : Fontana di Trevi, Piazza di Trevi, Rome (url)
- Jacques-François-Joseph Saly (1717–1776), 4 sculptures : Faun Holding a Goat, Musée Cognac-Jay, Paris (url)
- Francisco Salzillo (1707–1783), 1 sculpture : Dolorosa, Iglesia de Jesus, Murcia (url)
- Giuseppe Sammartino (1720–1793), 3 sculptures : Dead Christ Lying in the Shroud, Santa Maria della Pietà dei Sangro, Naples (url)
- Giuliano da Sangallo (1445–1516), 3 sculptures : Façade, Palazzo Gondi, Florence (url)
- Andrea Sansovino (1460–1529), 9 sculptures : Adoration of the Shepherds (detail), Santa Casa, Loreto (url)
- Jacopo Sansovino (1486–1570), 22 sculptures : Sacristy Door, Basilica di San Marco, Venice (url)
- Jacques Sarazin (1588–1660), 6 sculptures : Funeral Monument for the Heart of Cardinal de Bérule, Musée du Louvre, Paris (url)
- Johann Gottfried Schadow (1764–1850), 9 sculptures : Quadriga, Brandenburg Gate, Berlin (url)
- Ridolfo Schadow (1786–1822), 3 sculptures : Woman Spinning, Staatliche Museen, Berlin (url)
- Johann Nepomuk Schaller (1777–1842), 1 sculpture : Bellerophon Fighting the Chimaera, Österreichische Galerie Belvedere, Vienna (url)
- Johan Gregor van der Schardt (1530–1580), 5 sculptures : Flora, Kunsthistorisches Museum, Vienna (url)
- Petrus Scheemaekers the Elder (1652–1714), 2 sculptures : Memorial of the Van Delft and Keurlinckx Families, O.-L. Vrouwekathedraal, Antwerp (url)
- Andreas Schlüter (c. 1660 – 1714), 1 sculpture : Prince Elector Frederick William the Great, Schloss Charlottenburg, Berlin (url)
- Alexandre Schoenewerk (1820–1885), 2 sculptures : The Tarantine Girl, Musée d'Orsay, Paris (url)
- Ludwig Schwanthaler (1802–1848), 1 sculpture : Bavaria, Theresienwiese, Munich (url)
- Hans Schwarz (1492-after 1521), 2 sculptures : Portrait of Jan Gossart, Castello Sforzesco, Milan (url)
- Philipp Sengher (c. 1680 – 1723), 1 sculpture : Portrait of the Grand Prince Ferdinando de' Medici, Alberto Bruschi Collection, Grassina (url)
- Johan Tobias Sergel (1740–1814), 4 sculptures : Diomedes, Nationalmuseum, Stockholm (url)
- Giacomo Serpotta (1652–1732), 3 sculptures : Interior decoration, Oratorio del Rosario di San Domenico, Palermo (url)
- Feodosy Fyodorovich Shchedrin (1751–1825), 3 sculptures : Caryatids, Admiralty, St. Petersburg (url)
- Fedot Ivanovich Shubin (1740–1805), 7 sculptures : Bust of an Unknown Man, State Tretyakov Gallery, Moscow (url)
- Diego de Siloe (c. 1495 – 1563), 3 sculptures : Christ at the Column, Diocesan Museum of the Cathedral, Burgos (url)
- Gil de Siloe (c. 1480 – c. 1501), 8 sculptures : Tomb of Infante Alfonso, Monastery of Miraflores, Burgos (url)
- Silvestro Dell'Aquila (1471–1504), 1 sculpture : Monument of Maria Pereira and Beatrice Camponeschi (detail), San Bernardino, Aquila (url)
- Eugène Simonis (1810–1882), 1 sculpture : Innocence, Royal Museums of Fine Arts of Belgium, Brussels (url)
- Paul-Ambroise Slodtz (1702–1758), 1 sculpture : The Dead Icarus, Musée du Louvre, Paris (url)
- René-Michel Slodtz (1705–1764), 9 sculptures : The Capponi Monument, San Giovannini dei Fiorentini, Rome (url)
- Claus Sluter (1345–1406), 23 sculptures : Well of Moses, Musée Archéologique, Dijon (url)
- Antonio Sola (1787–1861), 1 sculpture : Daoíz and Velarde, Plaza del Dos de Mayo, Madrid (url)
- Cristoforo Solari (1489–1520), 5 sculptures : Effigies of Lodovico Sforza and Beatrice d'Este, Certosa, Pavia (url)
- Massimiliano Soldani Benzi (1656–1740), 22 sculptures : Bust of the Anima Beata, Liechtenstein Museum, Vienna (url)
- Johann Valentin Sonnenschein (1749–1828), 2 sculptures : Monument to Ludwig Rudolf von Jenner, Historisches Museum, Basel (url)
- Leonardo Sormani (active 1551–1589), 2 sculptures : Tomb of Nicholas IV, Santa Maria Maggiore, Rome (url)
- Savelli Sperandio (c. 1425 – c. 1504), 6 sculptures : Eleonora of Aragon, Rijksmuseum, Amsterdam (url)
- Innocenzo Spinazzi (1726–1798), 1 sculpture : Faith, Santa Maria Maddalena dei Pazzi, Florence (url)
- Niccolò di Forzore Spinelli (1430–1514), 6 sculptures : Giovanna degli Albizzi Tornabuoni, Münzkabinett, Staatliche Museen, Berlin (url)
- Alfred Stevens (1817–1875), 1 sculpture : Courage and Cowardice, Victoria and Albert Museum, London (url)
- Nicholas Stone (1586–1647), 4 sculptures : Monument to the Poet John Donne, St Paul's Cathedral, London (url)
- Veit Stoss (c. 1438 – 1533), 30 sculptures : Dormition of the Virgin, Church of St. Mary, Cracow (url)
- Johann Baptist Straub (1705–1784), 1 sculpture : St Barbara, Monastery Church, Ettal (url)
- Antonio Susini (before 1580–1624), 7 sculptures : Crucifix, San Marco, Florence (url)
- Francesco Susini (1585–1653), 11 sculptures : David with the Head of Goliath, Liechtenstein Museum, Vienna (url)
- Ambrosius van Swol (1640–1680), 1 sculpture : The Rat-Catcher, Rijksmuseum, Amsterdam (url)
- Jörg Syrlin the Elder (1420s–1481), 2 sculptures : Choir stalls, Münster, Ulm (url)

== T ==
- Pietro Tacca (1577–1640), 9 sculptures : Equestrian Monument to Ferdinando I de' Medici, Piazza Santissima Annunziata, Florence (url)
- Scipione Tadolini (1822–1892), 1 sculpture : Greek Slave, Museo de Bellas Artes, Seville (url)
- Bartolo Talpa (active c. 1495-), 2 sculptures : Francesco II Gonzaga, Münzkabinett, Staatliche Museen, Berlin (url)
- Jean-Pierre-Antoine Tassaert (1727–1788), 2 sculptures : Catherine the Great as Minerva, The Hermitage, St. Petersburg (url)
- Pietro Tenerani (1789–1869), 1 sculpture : Monument of Pius VIII, Basilica di San Pietro, Vatican (url)
- Francesco Terilli (1610–1630), 1 sculpture : Equestrian Monument to General Pompeo Giustiniani, Basilica dei Santi Giovanni e Paolo, Venice (url)
- Willem Danielsz van Tetrode (1505–1588), 4 sculptures : Nude Warrior, Rijksmuseum, Amsterdam (url)
- Renier van Thienen (1465–1498), 1 sculpture : Figures from the Tomb of Isabella of Bourbon, Rijksmuseum, Amsterdam (url)
- Gabriel-Jules Thomas (1824–1905), 3 sculptures : Virgil, Musée d'Orsay, Paris (url)
- Berthel Thorvaldsen (1768/70-1844), 17 sculptures : Adonis, Neue Pinakothek, Munich (url)
- Christian Friedrich Tieck (1776–1851), 2 sculptures : Clemens Brentano, Nationalgalerie, Berlin (url)
- Tino di Camaino (c. 1285 – c. 1337), 17 sculptures : Charity, Museo Bardini, Florence (url)
- Fyodor Petrovich Tolstoy (1783–1873), 4 sculptures : The Uprising in 1812, State Russian Museum, St. Petersburg (url)
- Narciso Tomé (1694–1742), 1 sculpture : Transparente, Cathedral, Toledo (url)
- Giuseppe Torretti (1664–1743), 2 sculptures : Assumption, Gesuiti, Venice (url)
- Giuseppe Antonio Torricelli (1659–1719), 2 sculptures : Cosimo III de' Medici, Museo dell'Opificio delle Pietre Dure, Florence (url)
- Sebastiano Torrigiani (1573–1596), 3 sculptures : Bust of Gregory XIV, Rijksmuseum, Amsterdam (url)
- Pietro Torrigiano (1472–1528), 2 sculptures : Monument to Henry VII (detail), Westminster Abbey, London (url)
- Niccolò Tribolo (1500–1558), 4 sculptures : Fountain of Hercules and Antaeus, Villa Castello, Rifredi, Florence (url)
- Arnt van Tricht (active c. 1530–1570), 1 sculpture : Ros Family Epitaph, Rijksmuseum, Amsterdam (url)
- Alexander Trippel (1744–1793), 1 sculpture : Johann Wolfgang von Goethe, Residenz, Bad Arolsen (url)
- Paolo Troubetzkoy (1866–1938), 2 sculptures : Robert de Montesquiou, Musée d'Orsay, Paris (url)
- Louis Tuaillon (1862–1919), 1 sculpture : Amazon, Nationalgalerie, Berlin (url)
- Jean-Baptiste Tuby (1635–1700), 2 sculptures : Apollo's Chariot, Garden of the Château, Versailles (url)
- Cosmè Tura (c. 1430 – 1495), 2 sculptures : St Francis of Assisi and Announcing Angel (panels of a polyptych), National Gallery of Art, Washington (url)

== V ==
- Lorenzo Vaccaro (1655–1706), 1 sculpture : Bust of Vincenzo Petra, Chiesa di San Pietro a Maiella, Naples (url)
- Luigi Valadier (1726–1785), 1 sculpture : Herm of Bacchus, Galleria Borghese, Rome (url)
- Francesco di Valdambrino (1363–1435), 1 sculpture : San Crescenzio, Museo dell'Opera del Duomo, Siena (url)
- Filippo della Valle (1698–1768), 4 sculptures : Annuciation, Sant'Ignazio, Rome (url)
- Luigi Vanvitelli (1700–1773), 1 sculpture : Diana and Actaeon, Royal Residence, Caserta (url)
- Giorgio Vasari (1511–1574), 1 sculpture : Entombment, Casa Vasari, Arezzo (url)
- Pietro Vassalletto (1200–1300), 4 sculptures : Cloister gallery, San Giovanni Laterano, Rome (url)
- Pietro Vassalletto (1154–1186), 3 sculptures : Easter Candlestick, San Paolo fuori le Mura, Rome (url)
- Louis-Claude Vassé (1716–1772), 1 sculpture : A Sleeping Shepherd, Musée du Louvre, Paris (url)
- Vecchietta (1405–1480), 3 sculptures : Arliquiera (outer shutters), Pinacoteca Nazionale, Siena (url)
- Vincenzo Vela (1820–1891), 1 sculpture : Spartacus, Museo Vela, Ligornetto (url)
- Hendrik Frans Verbruggen (1654–1724), 5 sculptures : Memorial of Bishop Marius Ambrose Capello, O.-L. Vrouwekathedraal, Antwerp (url)
- Theodoor Verhaegen (1701–1759), 5 sculptures : Pulpit (detail), Hanswijkkerk, Hanswijk (url)
- Rombout Verhulst (1624–1698), 7 sculptures : Tomb of Johan Polyander van Kerchoven, Pieterskerk, Leiden (url)
- Andrea del Verrocchio (1435–1488), 28 sculptures : The Baptism of Christ, Galleria degli Uffizi, Florence (url)
- Domenico de' Vetri (c. 1480 – c. 1547), 4 sculptures : Cosimo I de' Medici (obverse), Alessandro de' Medici (reverse), British Museum, London (url)
- Christophe Veyrier (1637–1689), 9 sculptures : Dying Achilles, Victoria and Albert Museum, London (url)
- Jacinto Vieira (c. 1700 – c. 1760), 1 sculpture : St Gertrude, Monastery church, Arouca (url)
- Albert Jansz Vinckenbrinck (1604–1665), 1 sculpture : Desiderius Erasmus, Rijksmuseum, Amsterdam (url)
- Girolamo Viscardi (1467-after 1522), 1 sculpture : Tomb of the Dukes of Orleans, Abbey Church, Saint-Denis (url)
- Peter Vischer the Elder (c. 1460 – 1529), 3 sculptures : Tomb of Maximilian I: King Arthur, Hofkirche, Innsbruck (url)
- Peter Vischer the Younger (1487–1528), 5 sculptures : Monument of Frederick the Wise, Schlosskirche, Wittenberg (url)
- Ivan Vitali (1794–1855), 5 sculptures : Portrait of the Painter Karl Bryullov, State Russian Museum, St. Petersburg (url)
- Alessandro Vittoria (1525–1608), 10 sculptures : Christ Resurrected, Santa Maria Gloriosa dei Frari, Venice (url)
- Giovanni Volpato (1735–1803), 2 sculptures : Clio, Liebieghaus, Frankfurt (url)
- Cornelis van der Voort (1576–1624), 5 sculptures : Bust of Jacobus Franciscus van Caverson, Royal Museums of Fine Arts of Belgium, Brussels (url)
- Jan de Vos (1592–1649), 1 sculpture : The Descent from the Cross, Stiftsmuseum, Klosterneuburg (url)
- Adriaen de Vries (1555–1626), 11 sculptures : Bacchus Discovering Ariadne on Naxos, Rijksmuseum, Amsterdam (url)

== W ==
- Veit Wagner (1492–1520), 1 sculpture : Christ in the Garden of Gethsemane, Cathedral, Strasbourg (url)
- Jean Warin (1607–1672), 1 sculpture : Richelieu, Bibliothèque Mazarine, Paris (url)
- Theodor Alexander Weber (1737–1806), 1 sculpture : Medal of Grand Duke Cosimo III, Museo di Palazzo Martelli, Florence (url)
- Henry Weekes (1807–1877), 1 sculpture : Bust of a Gentleman, Private collection (url)
- Christoph Weiditz (c. 1500 – 1559), 2 sculptures : Portrait Medal of Francisco de los Cobos y Molina, National Gallery of Art, Washington (url)
- Adriaen van Wesel (c. 1417 – 1499), 2 sculptures : The Visitation, Rijksmuseum, Amsterdam (url)
- Richard Westmacott (1775–1856), 4 sculptures : Horace's Dream, Petworth Cottage Museum, Petworth (url)
- Wiligelmo (1099–1120), 6 sculptures : Creation of Adam and Eve, Fall of Man, Cathedral of San Geminiano, Modena (url)
- Joseph Wilton (1722–1803), 1 sculpture : Oliver Cromwell, Victoria and Albert Museum, London (url)
- Hans Witten (1485–1525), 1 sculpture : Tulip Pulpit, Cathedral, Freiberg (url)
- Albert Wolff (1814–1892), 1 sculpture : Lion Fighter, Altes Museum, Berlin (url)
- Thomas Woolner (1825–1892), 1 sculpture : Heavenly Welcome, Private collection (url)
- Matthew Cotes Wyatt (1777–1862), 1 sculpture : Cenotaph to Princess Charlotte, St George's Chapel, Windsor (url)

== X ==
- Pieter Xavery (1647–1680), 5 sculptures : Two Laughing Jesters, Rijksmuseum, Amsterdam (url)

== Z ==
- Luigi Zandomeneghi (1778–1850), 1 sculpture : Tomb of Titian, Santa Maria Gloriosa dei Frari, Venice (url)
- Vasco de la Zarza (c. 1500 – 1524), 3 sculptures : Tomb of Don Alonso de Madrigal, Cathedral, Avila (url)
- Franz Anton von Zauner (1746–1822), 4 sculptures : Fries Funeral Monument, Castle Garden, Vöslau (url)
- Dominikus Zimmermann (1685–1766), 2 sculptures : Pulpit, Pilgrimage church, Wies (url)
- Michael Zürn (c. 1626 – c. 1691), 1 sculpture : Angel, Abbey Church, Kremsmünster (url)

== See also ==
- List of painters in the Web Gallery of Art
- List of graphic artists in the Web Gallery of Art
