= Lodovico Domenichi =

Italian humanist, translator and publisher (1515–1564)

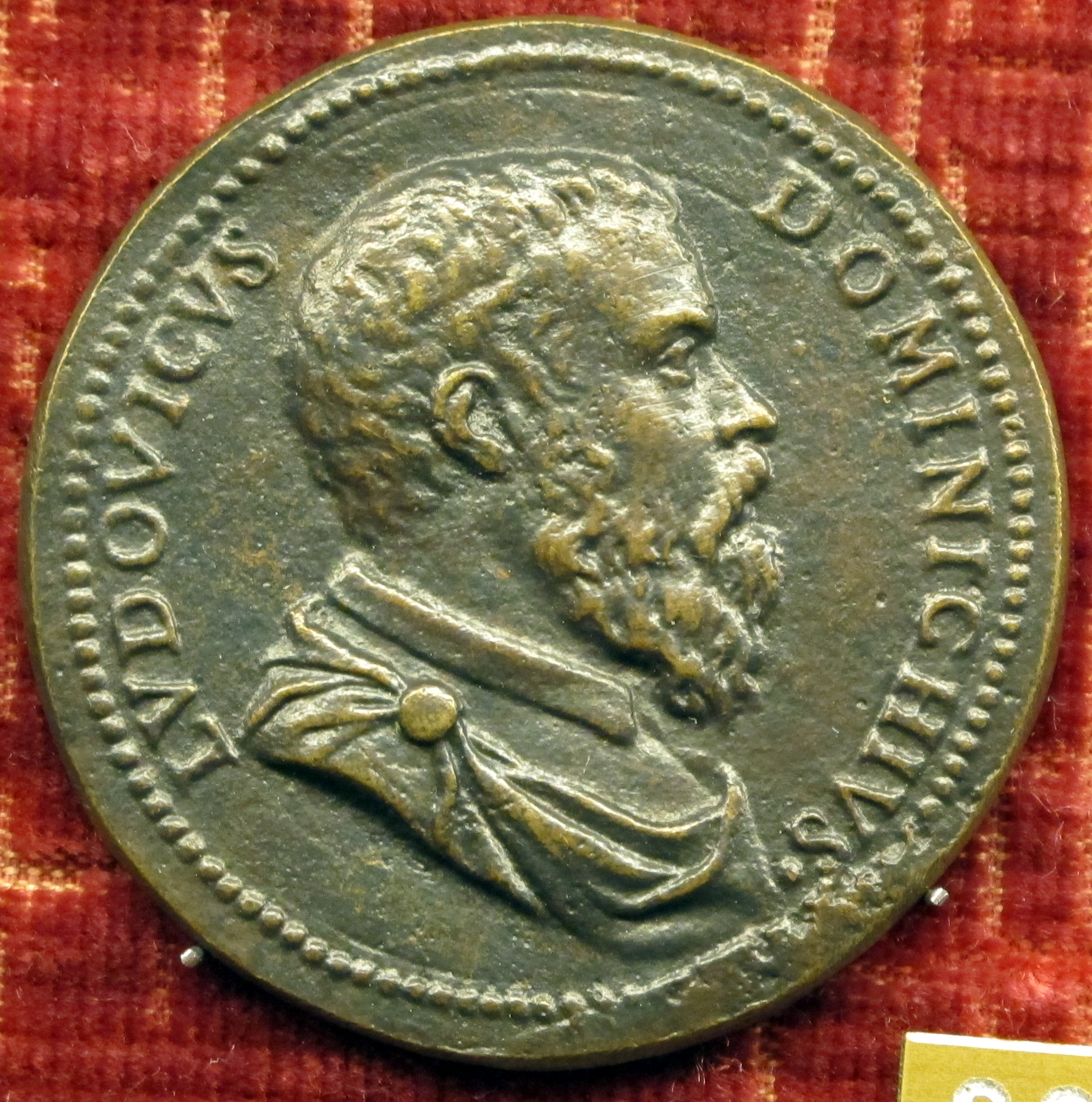
Ludovico Domenichi by Domenico Poggini

Lodovico Domenichi (1515 – 29 August 1564) was an Italian translator.

== Biography ==
Lodovico Domenichi was born in Piacenza (Italy) in 1515. After studying Law at the University of Padua, he pursued a literary career. He lived in Piacenza, Venice and Florence. He was renowned for his editions and translations of classical authors, including Xenophon, Plutarch, Polybius, and Pliny the Elder. He also authored the first Italian translation of the Letter of Aristeas. Domenichi died in Pisa, Tuscany (Italy) on August 29, 1564.

== Works ==
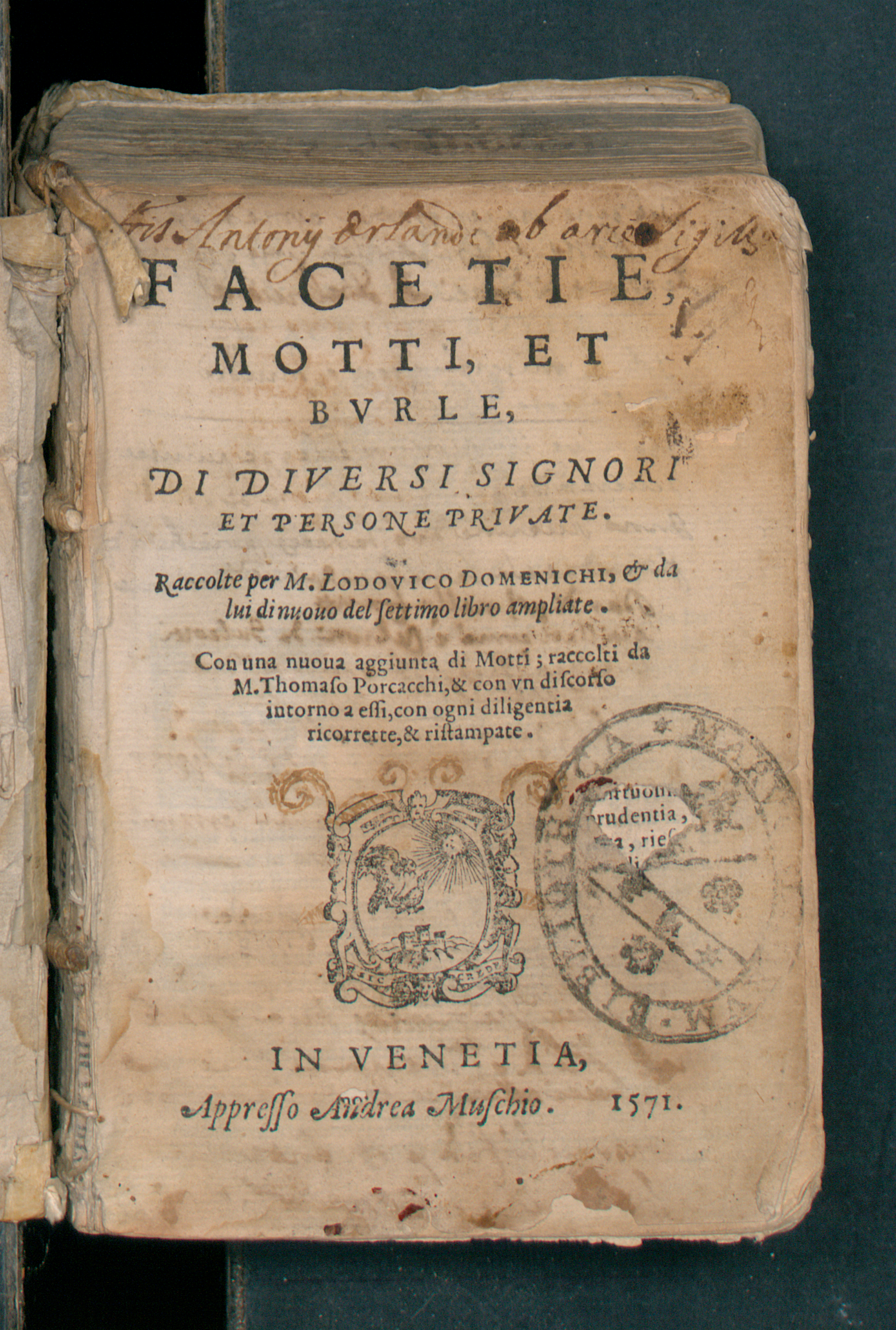
Facetie, Motti, et Burle, di diversi signori et persone private, 1571

- I Fatti de' Greci di Senofonte; i sette, libri di Senofonte della impresa di Ciro (Venice: Giolito, 1547, 1548, 1558)
- Polibio historico greco (Venice: Giolito, 1545, 1553)
- Historia naturale di G. Plinio Secondo (Venice: Giolito, 1561)
- Severino Boezio de' Conforti filosofici (Florence: Torrentino, 1550; Venice: Giolito, 1562)
- Istorie del suo tempo di Paolo Giovio (Florence: Torrentino, 1531, 1553)
- Le Vite di Leone X e di Adriano VI pontefici, e del cardinale Pompeo Colonna, del medesimo Paolo Giorno (Florence: Torrentino, 1549)
- La nobiltà delle donne (Venice: Giolito, 1549/1551)
- Aristea de' settantadue interpreti (Florence: Torrentino, 1550)
- Gli Elogi. Vite breuemente scritte d'huomini illustri di guerra, antichi, et moderni, di mons. Paolo Giouio (Turin, 1559)

== Bibliography ==
- Ginguené, Pierre-Louis (1856). "Domenichi (Louis)". In Louis Gabriel Michaud (ed.). Biographie universelle ancienne et moderne. Vol. 11 (2nd ed.). Paris: Chez Madame C. Desplaces. pp. 174–5.
