= Veit Wagner =

German sculptor

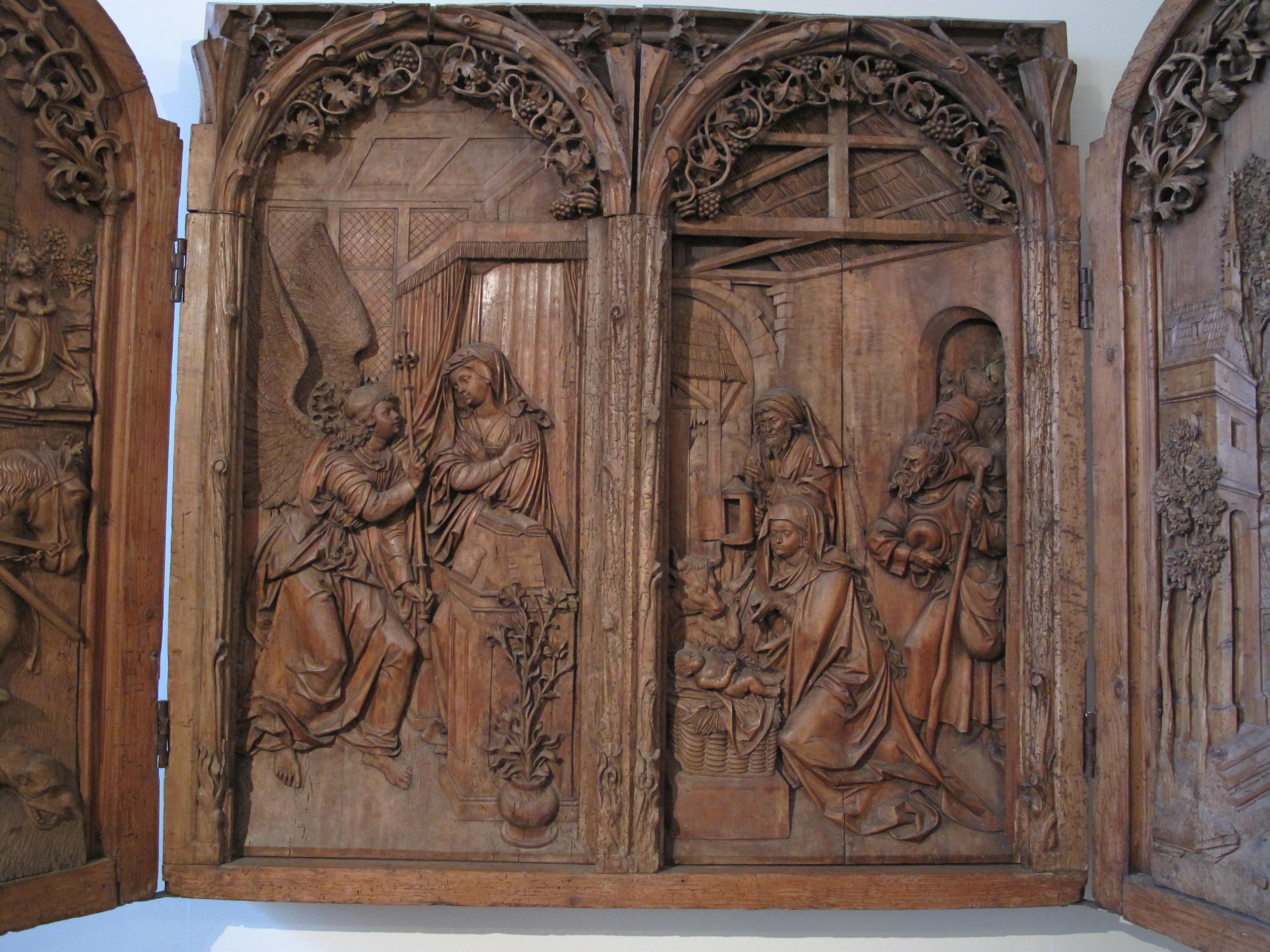
Bergheim altar, c. 1515, attributed to Veit Wagner

Veit Wagner (1420 - c. 1517) was a German sculptor active in Strasbourg from 1495 until his death. Some of his work may be seen in the Church of Saint-Georges in Haguenau, the Church of Saint-Pierre-le-Vieux in Strasbourg, and the monumental tomb in Obernai, as well as the Musée des beaux-arts in Mulhouse.
