= Pietro Vassalletto =

Italian sculptor

Pietro Vassalletto (fl. 1154 – 1186) was an Italian sculptor from a family of artists active in Rome during the 12th-14th centuries.

Among his work is the sculpture of the Easter Candlestick at the Basilica of Saint Paul Outside the Walls in Rome.
