= Galeazzo Mondella =

Italian goldsmith and sculptor (1467 to 1528)

Moderno (Galeazzo Mondella)
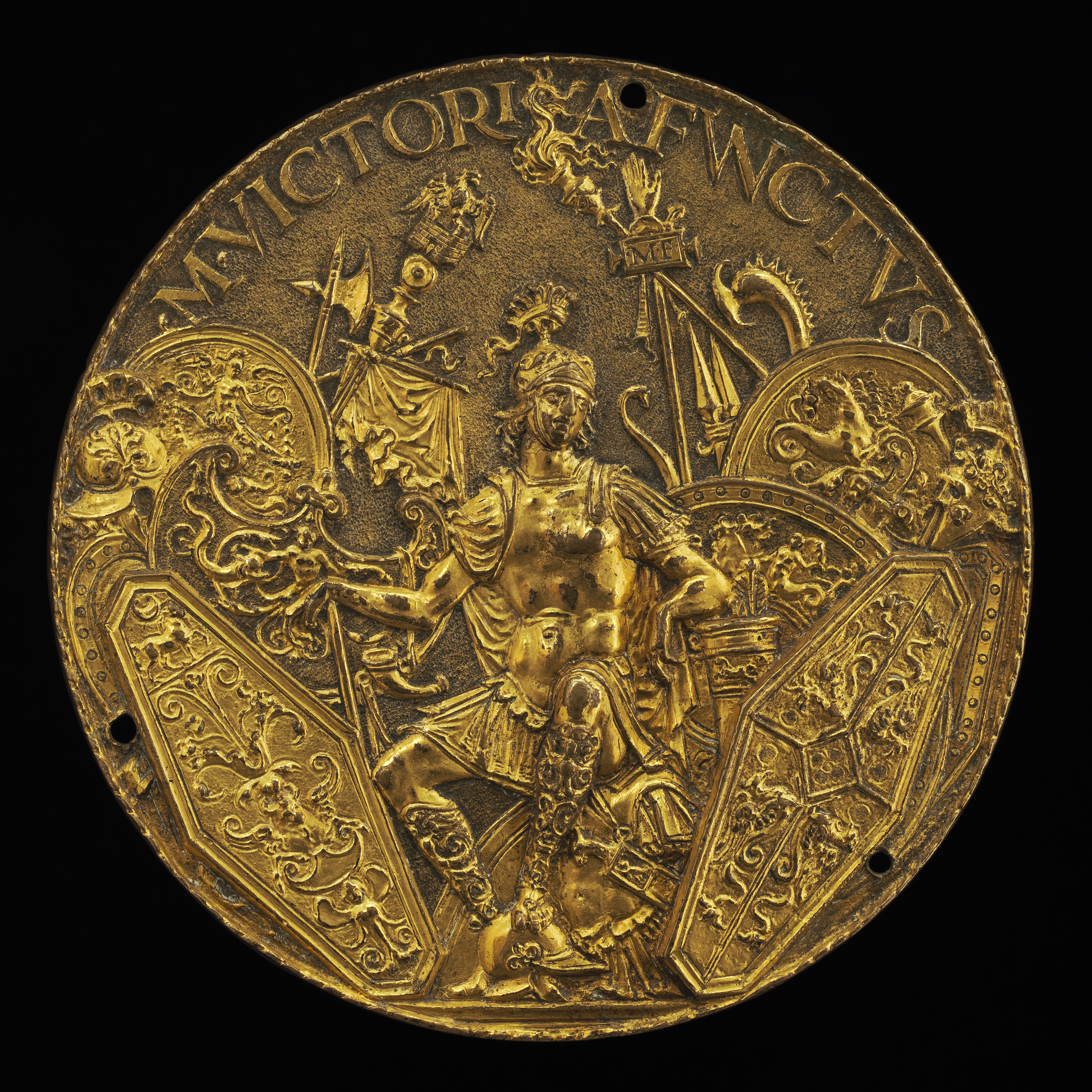
- Mars Surrounded by Trophies, c. 1500, gilt-bronze
- Born: Galeazzo Mondella; 1467; Verona, Italy
- Died: 1528 (aged 60–61); Verona, Italy
- Known for: Plaquette and medal design, gem engraving
- Notable work: Approximately 50 plaquette and 10 medal designs
- Movement: Italian Renaissance sculpture
- Patrons: Gonzaga courts at Mantua and Bozzolo, Cardinal Domenico Grimani and other patricians of Venice

Galeazzo Mondella, known as Moderno (Verona, 1467 – Verona, 1528), was an Italian goldsmith and medallist who became one of the most important designers of bronze plaquettes during the Italian Renaissance.

== Life and career ==
=== Early career ===
Mondella began his career as a medallist at the court of Mantua, where in 1487 he adopted the professional name "Moderno" (meaning "the Modern"). This name was chosen in contrast to his contemporary, the Mantuan bronzist Pier Jacopo Alari Bonacolsi, who was in the same year called "Antico" ("the Ancient") for the first time. Mondella had joined the Goldsmiths' Guild of Verona in 1485 at age eighteen. Moderno's pax design dated 1490, the Madonna and Child with Saints Anthony Abbot and Jerome (see Works no. 14) was signed on one cast "Mondella," but "Moderno" on almost all remaining casts.

=== Family connections ===
His brother Girolamo Mondella (1464–1512) was a celebrated painter with close ties to the Este court at Ferrara. This family connection probably influenced Moderno's early four-part series of Hercules plaquettes, which may have been created as a tribute to Ercole I d'Este, Duke of Ferrara (r. 1471–1505). The connection between the courts was strengthened when Ercole's daughter Isabella d'Este married Francesco II Gonzaga of Mantua in 1490.

=== Professional activities ===
From approximately 1485 to 1505, Moderno worked intermittently as a medallist at Mantua, also serving a cadet branch of the Gonzaga family at their court in Bozzolo. He served two terms as president of the Goldsmiths' Guild of Verona, from 1496–1497 and 1506–1507.

== Artistic development ==
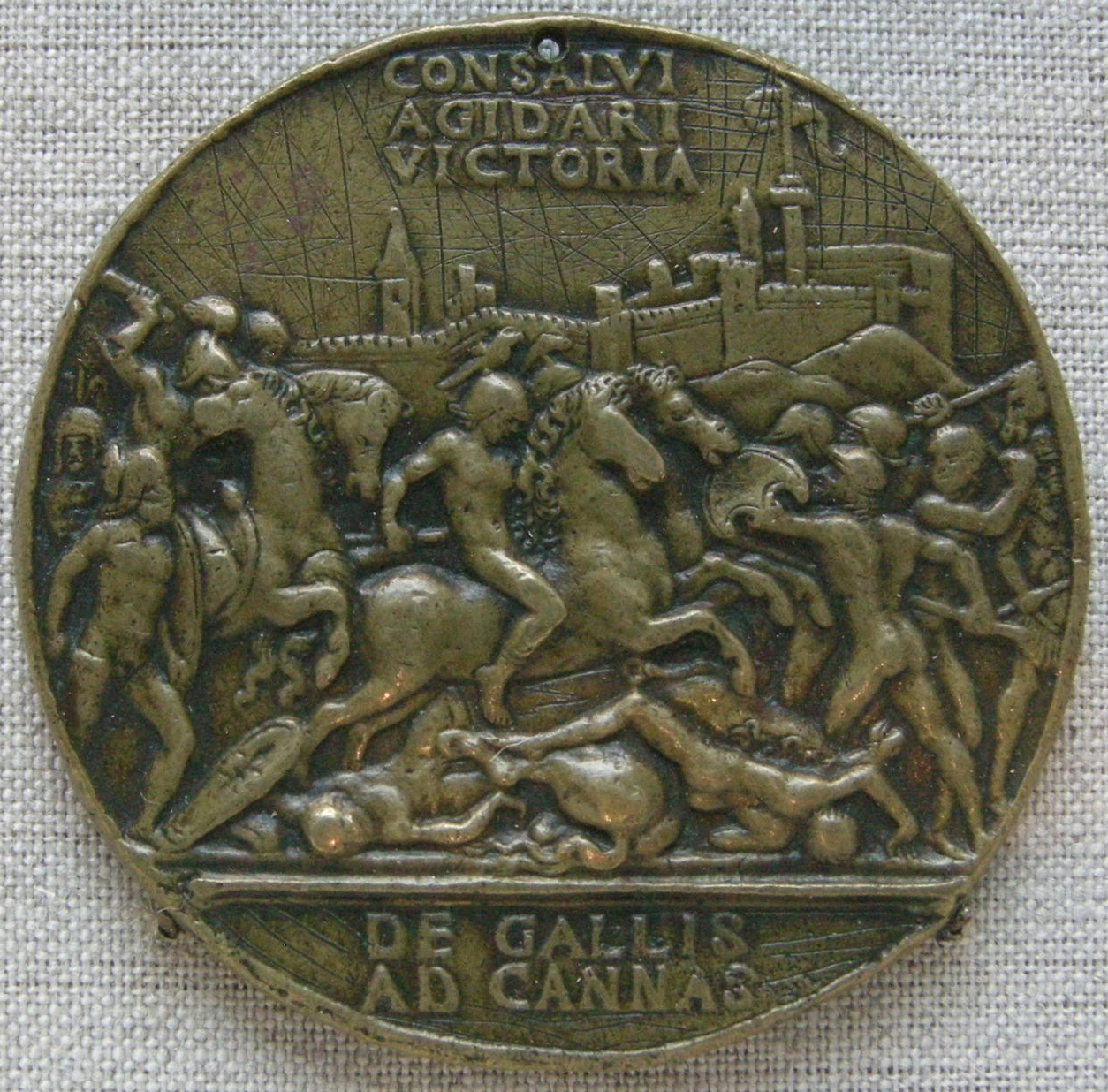
Battle of Cannae, 5.4 cm, bronze, National Gallery of Art

Moderno's artistic style evolved significantly throughout his career. His early work showed the influence of local Veronese artists including Francesco Bonsignori, Liberale da Verona, the Falconetto family, and particularly Andrea Mantegna. Through study of contemporary masters from Emilia, Lombardy, and the Veneto—such as Vincenzo Foppa, Antonello da Messina, the Bellini family, Bartolomeo Montagna, and Giovanni Battista Cima—his style developed toward a confident Roman classicism reminiscent of Raphael.

Moderno may have had access to Mantegna's studio at Mantua, either before 1488 or during 1490–1506. His Venetian patron Cardinal Domenico Grimani (1461–1523) introduced him to patrician families in Venice and possessed extensive collections of Raphael's drawings and cartoons. The Cardinal may possibly have facilitated a visit by Moderno to Rome around 1509–1511.

Moderno's acknowledged masterpieces (Works, nos. 47 and 48) are his two large gilded silver reliefs of 1506-1507, for the doors of Cardinal Grimani's famous Cabinet ["Scrigno"], which after being looted from the Ducal Palace in Venice (during the first years of the Austrian occupation, at the turn of the 19th century), are now in the Kunsthistorisches Museum, Vienna.

== Later career and legacy ==
Moderno assumed leadership of his family workshop in 1512, after which his independent plaquette inventions appear to have declined. Following the Imperial occupations of the Veneto (1509–1516), the Mondella family was restored to the Verona council of nobles in 1517. There follows a ten-year gap in his documented activity, during which Giorgio Vasari suggested Moderno may have traveled to France.

He had returned to Verona by 1527 and wrote his will there on May 5, 1528. The family workshop was inherited by his son Giambattista Mondella (1506–c. 1572), who with various collaborators continued to produce Moderno's designs for decades, with some production also occurring in Padua.

== Recognition and influence ==
Moderno's work attracted significant attention from prominent figures of his time. His plaquettes were collected by Erasmus and drew the interest of northern European artists including Albrecht Dürer and Hans Holbein, as well as French sculptors. One of the best of them, the David and a Companion with the Dead Goliath (see Works no. 32) provided -- in its kneeling, secondary figure -- a prototype for a comparable figure in Michelangelo's Last Judgment (1536) in the Sistine Chapel.

== Plaquettes by Moderno and his associates ==
| No. | Title and Date | Image | Dimensions, Material, Signature | Known Examples and Locations | References |
|---|---|---|---|---|---|
| 1 | Large Saint Sebastian (1485 or just after) | No image available | 13.1 × 9.1 cm, bronze, Signed "M" | Rare: examples at NGA, Washington; British Museum, London; Museo Civico, Padua; and Ashmolean Museum, Oxford (late cast). One example formerly at Berlin (Bange 1922, no. 464), but lost in 1945. | Molinier 1886, 1:135, no. 181; Pope-Hennessy 1965:55, no. 182; Lewis 1989:140, no. I.1 |
| 2 | The Crucifixion of Christ (late 1480s/early 1490s) | Kunstgewerbemuseum, Berlin | 12.8 × 9.1 cm with fillet border; 11.4 × 7.8 cm without border, bronze | Very frequent, with two dozen casts of the bordered variant in known repositories, with a similar dozen recorded/observed in private collections, for some 38 total; plus another three dozen of the unbordered variant in known locations, with at some two dozen similar casts of sharply divergent quality recorded or observed in private collections, for at least 63 [+38=101] casts. | Molinier 1886, 1:128, no. 171; Pope-Hennessy 1965:46, no. 147; Lewis 1989:140, no. I.2 |
| 3 | Lamentation of Christ in a Landscape (late 1480s/early 1490s) | National Gallery of Art, Washington | 10.6 × 6.9 cm, bronze | An original patinated example is unique at NGA, Washington; gilded examples are at Allen Museum, Oberlin, Ohio (Lewis and Struble 2018:49, fig. 9) and in Museo Lázaro Galdiano, Madrid (cut down atop city wall). Late aftercasts of this design, silhouetted around the figural heads, add torsos of Nicodemus and Joseph of Arimathea at left and right (7.0 × 7.2): Molinier 1886, 1:131, no. 174; Pope-Hennessy 1965:47, no. 149; Lewis 1989:140, no. III.A.1. Three of these are at NGA, Berlin, and St. Petersburg (with plain background plate); six others—two lacking Nicodemus—are variously mounted in pax frames (one dated 1559). | Molinier 1886, 1:130, no. 173; Pope-Hennessy 1965:46, no. 148; Lewis 1989:140, no. I.3 |
| 4 | Cacus Stealing from Hercules the Cattle of Geryon (c. 1487/1490) | Metropolitan Museum of Art, New York | 7.1 × 5.4 cm, bronze, Signed "O[pus] Moderni" | 25 signed casts are in known repositories, with 7 formerly reported. Unsigned casts include 4 fine examples, 6 less good (or reduced), and 8 formerly reported (which latter number includes 4 with unspecified signature status; total 50, as rectangles). Unsigned circular variants number at least 25 (unbordered or with simple fillets), as well as 6 with wide palmette borders, plus 2 others formerly reported. In addition, 2 fine trapezoidal reductions are incorporated within 16th-century utensils in Amsterdam and Washington. | Molinier 1886, 1:143, no. 194; Pope-Hennessy 1965:43, no. 135 (signature erased); Lewis 1989:140, no. I.5 |
| 5 | Hercules Recovering the Cattle Stolen by Cacus (c. 1487/1490) | National Gallery of Art, Washington | 7.1 × 5.4 cm, bronze, Signed "O[pus] Moderni" | Known repositories possess 14 signed casts, with 6 formerly reported. Two circular variants (6.4 cm diam.) have wide palmette borders, and three trapezoidal reductions are featured on elaborate utensils (2 at NGA, Washington, and 1 in Amsterdam). | Molinier 1886, 1:148(?), no. 201; Pope-Hennessy 1965:43-44, no. 137; Lewis 1989:140, no. I.4 |
| 6 | Hercules Vanquishing Cacus as a Monster Centaur (late 1480s/early 1490s) | National Gallery of Art, Washington | 6.9 × 5.5 cm, bronze, Signed "O[pus] Moderni" | Known repositories include 11 signed casts, with 9 others formerly reported; unsigned examples include 7 in known locations, plus 5 formerly reported. One circular variant (6.4 cm diam.) with a wide palmette border (total diam. 11.8) is in the British Museum, London, and 3 trapezoidal reductions are incorporated in elaborate utensils in Washington (2) and Amsterdam (1). | Molinier 1886, 1:144(?), no. 195; Pope-Hennessy 1965:43, no. 136; Lewis 1989:140, no. I.6 |
| 7 | Hercules Triumphant over the Slain Cacus (c. 1487/1490) | National Gallery of Art, Washington | 7.0 × 5.5 cm, bronze, Signed "O[pus] Moderni" | Seventeen casts—ranging from fine to poor—are in known locations, with another 10 formerly reported; all are signed. Circular variants in wide palmette borders (with dimensions as in No. 6 above) include 2 in known repositories, plus 1 formerly reported. | Molinier 1886, 1:149(?), no. 204; Pope-Hennessy 1965:44, no. 138; Lewis 1989:140, no. I.7 |
| 8 | Hercules Overcoming Antaeus, before a Ruined Loggia (c. 1488/1489) | Cabinet des Médailles, Paris | 7.6 × 5.9 cm, bronze | Some 20 casts are in known locations (ranging from fine to merely average), with 15 formerly reported. A ?Moderno shop variant (in 2 locations, with 2 others reported) completes the loggia as an open cloister, while the "Master of the Labors of Hercules" presents a completely different, and later, design (no. 65 below). Possibly forged variants, including a tree-trunk (7.1 × 5.4), are in two locations—not to be confused with no. 65 below, by the Hercules Master (9.7 × 7.7). | Molinier 1886, 1:148, no. 203(?); Pope-Hennessy 1965:50, no. 162; Lewis 1989:140, no. I.9 |
| 9 | Standing Hercules with the Nemean Lion (c. 1488/1489) | No image available | 7.8 × 5.8 cm, bronze | Frequently encountered, with at least 30 casts in known repositories, plus some 20 more formerly recorded. The "Master of the Augmented Roundels" reproduced its figural group in a rocky landscape (no. 67 below). | Molinier 1886, 1:146-7, no. 198; Bange 1922:65, no. 474; not in Pope-Hennessy 1965; Lewis 1989:140, no. I.10; Lewis and Struble 2018:50, fig.11 |
| 10 | Small Saint Sebastian (before 1487) | National Gallery of Art, Washington | 7.8 × 5.7 cm, bronze | Some 18 casts are in known repositories (the Kress example at the NGA, Washington, being by far the finest), with another 16 formerly recorded. | Molinier 1886, 1:136, no. 182; Pope-Hennessy 1965:48, no. 154; Lewis 1989:140, no. I.11 |
| 11 | Madonna and Child with Six 'Saints' [Allegory of Faith and Virtue] (after 1488) | National Gallery of Art, Washington | 6.9 × 5.5 cm, bronze; Silver-gilt prototype(?) in the Victoria & Albert Museum, London | Silver-gilt prototype(?) in the Victoria & Albert Museum, London (with one reported bronze cast) displays flying putti above swags in upper corners, omitted from the standard bronze casts. 9 of these are in known repositories, with 9 others formerly reported. | Molinier 1886, 1:121, no. 164; Pope-Hennessy 1965:45, no. 142; Lewis 1989:140, no. I.8 |
| 12 | Vulcan Forging the Arrows of Cupid (c. 1490) | National Gallery of Art, Washington | 3.1 cm diam., bronze | Apparently unique (in this autograph smallest version) at NGA, Washington. Later variants, expanded to 3.8 diam. (Molinier 1886, 1, no. 189; listed a 2nd time, verbatim, as no. 483) are known in a dozen locations; an oval version (Molinier 1886, no. 481, at 4.5 × 3.5) is in Berlin (Bange 1922:68, no. 497); 3rd variant, 3.6 diam., British Museum, London (Bange 1922, no. 495 note). | Not in Molinier 1886; Pope-Hennessy 1965:99, no. 355; not in Lewis 1989 |
| 13 | Pietà between Candelabra (c. 1488/1490) | National Gallery of Art, Washington | 8.1 × 5.9 cm, bronze | Seven casts are in known repositories (of which only 3 are fine, and 2 gilded examples are variously framed), with another 8 casts formerly reported. | Molinier 1886, 2:37, no. 386; Pope-Hennessy 1965:55, no. 181; Lewis 1989:140, no. I.12 |
| 14 | Madonna and Child, with Saints Anthony Abbot and Jerome (1490) | Metropolitan Museum of Art, New York | 10.8 × 6.2 cm, bronze, Dated "MCCCCXC"; Signed, both as "Mondelª" (on lost Garnier cast) and as "Mo/derni" (on most other casts) | Some 40 examples are in known repositories (including 5 variants: 1 in lead, and 1 fully decorated with polychrome enamels), with 15 formerly reported. | Molinier 1886, 1:, no. 161; Pope-Hennessy 1965:42, no. 133; Lewis 1989:140, no. I.13 |
| 15 | A Senatorial Triumph (c. 1490) | National Gallery of Art, Washington | 4.1 cm diam., bronze, Signed "M"; Inscribed SENATVS POP[U]L[U]S | Unique (at superb autograph quality) at NGA, Washington. Aftercasts (several heavily re-engraved) are in 6 known repositories. Also issued as a 'medallic' reverse to an autograph 'portrait' of Diva Faustina (10 examples in known collections, with 3 others formerly reported). | Molinier 1886, 2:140, no. 640; Pope-Hennessy 1965:87, no. 304; not in Lewis 1989 (but see Lewis 1987:81, fig. 7) |
| 16 | Large Saint Jerome (c. 1490) | Metropolitan Museum of Art, New York | 7.8 × 6.0 cm, bronze | Ten examples are in known locations (4 being conspicuously fine), plus five formerly recorded; a reduced circular variant is in Berlin (Bange 1922:95, no. 691). | Molinier 1886, 1:136, no. 183; Pope-Hennessy 1965:48, no. 156; Lewis 1989:140, no. I.14 |
| 17 | Ornamental Relief: Frontal Harpy between Winged Sea-Horses (early 1490s) | National Gallery of Art, Washington | 2.4 × 5.5 cm, bronze | Unique at NGA, Washington (but see similar motifs on nos. 3, 11, 14, 19, 43 & 47, and also on two pax frames previously recorded). | Not in Molinier 1886; Pope-Hennessy 1965:108, no. 398; Lewis 1989:140, no. II.46 |
| 18 | Adoration of the Magi (early 1490s) | National Gallery of Art, Washington | 9.9 × 6.6 cm; 11.1 × 7.2 cm with quadruple-fillet borders, bronze | Three casts in known collections have quadruple-fillet borders (11.1 × 7.2), while three more bordered casts were formerly reported. Some 22 unbordered casts occur in known repositories (only 10 are of good quality, the rest being aftercasts); another 10 were formerly reported. A further 8 recorded examples are somewhat oversize, and may be considered as forgeries. | Molinier 1886, 1:125, no. 168; Pope-Hennessy 1965:45, no. 144; Lewis 1989:140, no. I.15 |
| 19 | Presentation of Christ in the Temple (early 1490s) | National Gallery of Art, Washington | 10.0 × 6.5 cm; 11.3 × 7.7 cm with multiple-fillet border, bronze | Three casts in known collections have a multiple-fillet border (11.3 × 7.7), as do four others, formerly reported. Thirteen unbordered examples are in known repositories (two having upper corners trimmed into arched tops; one [though early] is heavily re-tooled), with twelve more formerly reported. | Molinier 1886, 1:126, no. 169; Pope-Hennessy 1965:46, no. 145; Lewis 1989:140, no. I.16 |
| 20 | Entombment, with a Figured Sarcophagus (middle or late 1490s) | Metropolitan Museum of Art, New York | 10.1 × 6.8 cm, bronze | Three examples in known repositories have multiple-fillet borders, as do 2 others, formerly reported. Some sixteen unbordered casts are in known locations, with 12 more formerly reported. | Molinier 1886, 1:127(?), no. 172; Pope-Hennessy 1965:47, no. 150; Lewis 1989:140, no. I.17 |
| 21 | The Resurrection of Christ (late 1480s) | National Gallery of Art, Washington | 10.1 × 6.5 cm, bronze | Seven casts with narrow fillet borders are in known repositories, with two others formerly known; 26 unbordered examples are in known collections (a half-dozen being of notably poor quality), with at least a dozen others formerly recorded (one of which was a cut-down silver cast, mounted as a pax). | Molinier 1886, 1:134, no. 180; Pope-Hennessy 1965:47, no. 151; Lewis 1989:140, no. I.18 |
| 22 | Running Hercules (middle or late 1490s) | National Gallery of Art, Washington | 3.0 cm diam., bronze | Only two casts known, at NGA, Washington, and at Kunsthistorisches Museum, Vienna. | Planiscig 1919:179, no. 360; not in Pope-Hennessy 1965; Lewis 1898:140, no. I.19 |
| 23 | David and Goliath (middle or late 1490s) | National Gallery of Art, Washington | 3.0 cm diam., bronze | Only two casts known, at NGA, Washington, and in Staatliche Museen, Berlin. | Bange 1922:60, no. 439; not in Pope-Hennessy 1965; Lewis 1989:140, no. I.20 |
| 24 | Mars Enjoying Victory (c. 1500) | First state, National Gallery of Art, Washington Second state, National Gallery of Art, Washington | 6.5 and 7.0 cm diam., bronze, Signed "M F" | First state known in two examples: an unfinished 'proof' in Bargello, Florence, and a cast at NGA, Washington (with signature almost effaced). Second state (with old gilding) known in examples at NGA, Washington, and former collection of Guy Ladrière, then John Gaines. A much reduced variant (4.9 diam. with a heavy triple-fillet border) is a promised gift to Accademia Carrara, Bergamo. | Molinier 1886, 1:141-142, nos. 187-188; Pope-Hennessy 1965:44, nos. 139-140; Lewis 1989:140, no. I.21 (first and second states) |
| 25 | Orpheus Attacked by the Tracian Women (before 1503) | Museo del Bargello, Florence | 6.1 cm diam., bronze | Flat-field examples (most with single-fillet rims) are in 5 known repositories, with 7 others formerly recorded. Four concave casts (all with double-fillet rims) are in known collections, with 1 other formerly recorded; 2 convex casts are in Berlin and Brescia (trimmed). An example with a wide palmette border, as well as a gilt cast (irregularly cut down) are both in the Bargello, Florence. | Molinier 1886, 1:152, no. 211; Pope-Hennessy 1965:53, no. 175; Lewis 1989:140, no. I.22; Lewis and Struble 2018:52, fig. 14 |
| 26 | Hercules and the Nemean Lion, with Solomon and Acheloüs Medallions (c. 1500/1505) | National Gallery of Art, Washington | 9.2 × 4.2 cm, bronze | Only four casts of this full design are in known repositories (probably including one reported in 1865). Three casts of the central panel only are in known collections (one circular). An autograph(?) panel-framed expansion of the central composition, at the same scale, is discussed in no. 54 below. | Molinier 1886, 1:146, no. 200; Pope-Hennessy 1965:50, no. 164; Lewis 1989:140, no. I.23; Lewis and Struble 2018:50, fig. 12 |
| 27 | Nessus and Deianira, with Hercules and Victory Medallions (c. 1500/1505) | Bode-Museum, Berlin | 9.4 × 4.3 cm, bronze | Only 2 locations have original casts of both nos. 26 & 27; aftercasts of no. 27 alone are in 3 other repositories. Excerpts of this central panel alone are in 3 different locations, with another 5 such examples formerly recorded. Derivative circular casts (none of which seem to have been produced in Moderno's own shop) with various border treatments are in 5 known locations, with 3 others formerly reported. | Molinier 1886, 1:150, no. 205; Pope-Hennessy 1965:51, no. 165; Lewis 1989:140, no. I.24 |
| 28 | Opportunity Seizing Time (20 November 1504) | Museo del Bargello, Florence [?] | 4.6 cm diam., bronze, Inscribed BENE HANC CAPIAS ET CAPTAN TENETO | As a uniface plaquette (without inscription), apparently unique in Berlin (4.5 diam.): Molinier 1886, 1:153, no. 214 (as Moderno); Bange 1922:73, no. 532 (as by Moderno follower); Lewis 1989:119, fig.22, 122, note 169 (as definitely by Moderno). | Hill 1930, 1:53, no. 215; Lewis 1987:86-87, fig. 12 |
| 29 | Sword Pommel, with the Continence of Scipio, obverse (c. 1504/1505) | National Gallery of Art, Washington | 6.0 × 7.5 cm, bronze | Complete swords with this full pommel (see no. 30) are in 2 known locations, with 1 other formerly recorded. This obverse alone occurs in 13 known repositories, with 3 others formerly reported. Two bordered, circular variants are in known collections. | Not[?] in Molinier 1886?; Bange 1922:63, no. 462; Maclagan 1924:31, no. 4481-1858; Lewis 1989:140, no. I.38 |
| 30 | Sword Pommel, with An Allegory of Victory, reverse (c. 1504/1505) | Museo Correr, Venice | 6.0 × 7.4 cm, bronze | Complete swords with this full double-sided pommel (see no. 29) are in 2 known locations, with 1 other formerly recorded. This uniface reverse alone occurs in at least 5 known repositories. | Molinier 1886, 2:92, no. 513; Pope-Hennessy 1965:51, no. 167; Lewis 1989:140, no. I.39 |
| 31 | Mars and Victory (c. 1504/1505) | National Gallery of Art, Washington | 7.1 × 5.6 cm, bronze, Possibly signed | 23 examples of this rectangular design are in known collections (the reverse of one of which bears the incised inscription "Opus Moderni"), with 20 others formerly recorded. A tiny circular version (with an identical figure group 2.4 high, possibly cast from a gem engraving) is known in 2 locations (probably including 1 reported in 1923). A circular derivative with lateral additions, by the Master of the Augmented Roundels, is no. 68 below. | Molinier 1886, 1:139, no. 186, note; Pope-Hennessy 1965:49, no. 159; Lewis 1989:140, no. I.25 |
| 32 | David and a Companion with the Dead Goliath (c. 1504/1505) | National Gallery of Art, Washington | 7.1 × 5.6 cm, bronze | Twenty-seven examples of this original rectangular form are in known locations, with another 15 formerly reported. A circular reduction (cropped to 6.6 diam.) occurs in 4 known collections, with another 6 formerly recorded. A unique trapezoidal variant (6.9 × 5.4) is in the Rijksmuseum, Amsterdam. An expanded circular version by the Master of the Augmented Roundels was made about a decade later (no. 69 below). | Molinier 1886, 1:118, no. 159, note; not in Pope-Hennessy 1965; Lewis 1989:140, no. I.26 |
| 33 | Battle Scene (c. 1504) | No image available | 2.0 × 1.4 cm, Shell cameo engraving | This example (formerly in the Orléans collection) of Moderno's oft-noted gem-engraving skill is the source for nos. 34 and 37. | Reinach 1895, 137, no. I. ter, with note 1, pl. 125; Lewis 1989:140, no. I.27 |
| 34 | Battle of Cannae (1504/1505) | National Gallery of Art, Washington | 5.2 cm diam., bronze, Originally inscribed CONSALVI / AGIDARI / VICTORIA / and in exergue DE GALLIS / AD CANNAS | In its apparent first form, as a double-sided plaquette incorporating on its reverse the arms [not by Moderno] of the 'Great Captain' Gonzalo Fernández de Córdova y Aguilar, and as originally designed as a sword-pommel, the full plaquette appears on a sword in Madrid (the weapon of its namesake), as well as on two others formerly reported. There are 7 double plaquettes of that design (detached from their swords) in known locations, with two others formerly recorded. The Battle of Cannae alone exists in 10 known repositories, with 8 others formerly reported; uninscribed uniface specimens occur in Milan, and in 2 collections formerly recorded. | Molinier 1886, 2:139. no. 637; Pope-Hennessy 1965:31, no. 93; Lewis 1987:83-86, fig. 10 |
| 35 | Lamp Lid, with the Judgment of Solomon (c. 1504/1507) | No image available | 6.6 × 3.7 cm, bronze | Two known examples at the Victoria & Albert Museum, London, and in the former Rosenheim collection. | Not in Molinier 1886?; not in Bange 1922; Maclagan 1924:32, no. A.432-1910; Lewis 1989:140, no. I.36 |
| 36 | Lamp Lid, with Justice, Prudence, and Fortitude (c. 1504/1507) | No image available | 6.6 × 3.8 cm, bronze | Unique in Berlin, as tondo form is unique at NGA, Washington. | Molinier 1886, 1:108, no. 154 (figure group alone, as tondo); Pope-Hennessy 1965:102, no. 371 (same); Lewis 1989:140, no. I.37 (full form, as Moderno) |
| 37 | A Lion Hunt (c. 1504/1510) | National Gallery of Art, Washington | 8.3 cm diam., bronze | 18 examples of this original circular form are in known repositories, with 16 others formerly reported. A trapezoidal variant is on a Candlestick at the NGA, Washington. | Molinier 1886, 1:155, no. 217; Pope-Hennessy 1965:52, no. 168; Lewis 1989:140, no. I.28 |
| 38 | Marcus Curtius (c. 1505) | No image available | 3.3 cm diam., bronze | Examples at Belluno, Museo del Bargello, and 2 other repositories formerly recorded. | Molinier 1886, 2:220, no. 746; Bange 1922:68, no. 493 (lost in 1945); Lewis 1989:140, no. I.33 |
| 39 | Kneeling Hercules with the Nemean Lion (c. 1505) | Private Collection | 10.5 cm diam., bronze | The three images in Lewis and Struble 2018 represent the only known casts of this autograph original (proven by the better accommodation of the hero's and the lion's feet on a curved, rather than a flat, ground-line: compare the Master of the Labors of Hercules' rectangular version, no 63, for the latter). Two are in known collections; a third was reported in 1836. | Lewis and Struble 2018:42-44, figs. 1-3 |
| 40 | Fall of Phaeton (just after 1505) | National Gallery of Art, Washington | 10.5 cm diam., bronze | Earliest(?) versions (as unbordered plain disks, lacking the background) of 9.5 diam. are in 5 known locations (2 with borders, at 10.0 and 10.2 diam.). Fine casts of the standard type with triple-fillet borders are in 4 known repositories, with 2 others formerly recorded; similar good casts are in 5 collections, with 3 others formerly reported. Mediocre casts including such borders are in 5 locations, while 5 others, previously recorded, are of unknown quality. The Master of the Augmented Roundels re-issued this figure group (with a classicizing background, no. 70), at the size of the unbordered casts above—thus demonstrating the autograph status of this design (even though, together with no. 39, Moderno's 2 originals in this format do share the standard size [10.5 diam.] common to that Master—and also to the unrelated Master of the Orpheus and Arion Roundels, who was principally influenced by Cima). | Molinier 1886, 1:142, no. 191; Pope-Hennessy 1965:49, no. 160 (as 'Death of Hippolytus'); Lewis 1989:140, no. I. 29; Lewis and Struble 2018:45, fig.5 |
| 41 | Small Saint Jerome (c. 1505/1507) | No image available | 5.8 × 4.4 cm, bronze | Unique[?] at NGA, Washington (since there is no second example at Brescia). | Molinier 1886, 1:137, no. 184; Pope-Hennessy 1965:55, no. 183; Lewis 1989:140, no. I.30 |
| 42 | Prometheus Creating Man (c. 1505/1507) | National Gallery of Art, Washington | 4.7 cm diam., bronze | Only three casts are known to exist, in Washington, Vienna and Berlin. | Molinier 1886, 1:20, no. 36, 1:206, no. 36; Pope-Hennessy 1965:51, no. 166; Lewis 1989:140, no. I.32; Lewis and Struble 2018:52, fig. 13 |
| 43 | Small Madonna and Child, with Two Kneeling Angels (c. 1505/1507) | No image available | 4.0 × 3.1 cm, bronze | Unique at Victoria & Albert Mus., London. | Molinier 1886, 1:118, no. 160; Maclagan 1924:42, no. 2535-1856; Lewis 1989:140, no. I.34 |
| 44 | Small Entombment of Christ (c. 1505/1507) | National Gallery of Art, Washington | 3.9 × 2.9 cm, bronze | Three examples are in known locations, with 1 other formerly reported. Unique oval and round variants of the composition are both in Berlin. | Not in Molinier 1886; Pope-Hennessy 1965:47, no. 152; Lewis 1989:140, no. I.35 |
| 45 | Augustus and the Tiburtine Sibyl (c. 1507) | National Gallery of Art, Washington | 5.7 cm diam., bronze | 14 examples are in known collections, with 6 others formerly reported. | Molinier 1886, 1:138, no. 185; Pope-Hennessy 1965:49, no. 157; Lewis 1989:140, no. I.31 |
| 46 | Madonna and Child with Two Standing Angels (c. 1505/1507) | National Gallery of Art, Washington | 6.4 x 5.4; bronze | 5 examples with plain ground in known locations, with 5 others formerly recorded. A similar example mounted in a pax frame in Berlin, with 3 others formerly reported. A slightly taller variant (usually inscribed AVE REGINA CELORVM), with incised decoration in the spandrels of a circumscribing arch, occurs in 7 locations, with 2 others formerly recorded. A more elaborate variant shows incised pilasters supporting that arch: 4 examples in known repositories, with 6 others formerly reported. | Molinier 1886, 1:122, no. 165; Pope-Hennessy 1965:45, no. 143; Lewis 1989:140, no. I.40 |
| 47 | Sacra Conversazione: Madonna and Child with Saints (1506-1507) | No image available | 13.9 x 10.2; Gilded silver | Unique. Commissioned by Cardinal Domenico Grimani of Venice (1461-1523) as one portal of the Scrigno Grimani, given by his heirs to the Venetian State in 1593. Reliefs looted 1797/1801; documented in Vienna from 1802 (and from 1891 in the Kunsthistorisches Museum). | Molinier 1886, 1:122, no. 166; Planiscig 1924:247, no. 409; Leithe-Jasper 1986:128, no. and color pl. 26; Lewis 1987:79, fig. 3; Lewis 1989:140, no. I.41, with color pl. 1 |
| 48 | Flagellation of Christ (1506-1507) | Kunsthistorische Museum, Vienna | 13.8 x 10.2; Gilded silver, signed "OP[VS] MODERNI"; bronze | Unique silver original at Vienna. Contemporaneous bronze examples in 18 known locations, with 17 others formerly recorded. Aftercasts with "restored" vaults in 6 known collections, with 3 others formerly reported. For 3 examples from known repositories, with 5 others formerly recorded, the status of the vaults is not specified. | Molinier 1886, 1:126, no. 170; Pope-Hennessy 1965:42, no. 134; Leithe-Jasper 1986:125, no. and color pl. 25; Lewis 1989:140, no. I.42, with color pl. 2 |
| 49 | Pietà with the Virgin, Saint John, and an Angel (c. 1508/1513) | National Gallery of Art, Washington | 7.3 x 5.7; bronze | Unbordered original casts in 8 known locations, with 4 others formerly reported; versions with narrow flanges in 4 known collections, with 8 others formerly recorded. With wide anthemion borders in 5 known repositories. Reworked variant type in 7 repositories, with 3 others formerly recorded; haloed examples with foliate finials in 2 known collections, and 2 others formerly reported. Some 45 later variations in pax frames: at least 30 in known locations (one dated "1513"), with 15 formerly recorded. | Molinier 1886, 1:132, nos. 176-177; Pope-Hennessy 1965:48, no. 153; Lewis 1989:140, no. I.45 |
| 50 | Apollo (1511/1513) | No image available | 9.9 x 4.4 x 0.8; Hardstone carving, signed "OP[VS] Moderni" | Unique at Vienna. Possibly ordered by Cardinal Domenico Grimani, as sculptural 'translation' of the figure in the left-hand niche of Raphael's School of Athens fresco at the Vatican. | Lewis 1989:140, no. I.43 |

== Plaquettes Made in Related Shops ==
| No. | Title and Date | Image | Dimensions, Material, Signature | Known Examples and Locations | References |
|---|---|---|---|---|---|
| 51 | Saint Mary Magdalene (c. 1490s?) | No image available | 4.6 diam.; bronze | Unique in the NGA, Washington | Not in Molinier 1886; Pope-Hennessy 1965:102, no. 370; not in Lewis 1989 |
| 52 | Circular Battle Scene: DVBIA FORTV NA (c. 1505/1510) | Cleveland Museum of Art | 5.3 diam.; bronze; the elided final letters may be a signature [“M”] or Moderno’s ‘shop mark’ | Inscribed, unbordered examples in 12 known repositories, with 5 others formerly recorded. Inscribed circular versions with molded border in Venice and 2 other collections. Bordered circular examples lacking inscription in 2 known locations, with 3 others formerly recorded; circular casts lacking both inscriptions and borders in 3 known collections, with 1 other formerly reported. Also occurs on 4 sword-pommels. | Molinier 1886, 1:153, no. 215; Pope-Hennessy 1965:56, no. 186; Lewis 1989:140, no. II.47 |
| 53 | Battle Scene, in a rectangular frame (c. 1505/1510) | National Gallery of Art, Washington | 5.7 x 6.5; bronze | Uninscribed versions in full paneled frames in 10 known repositories, with 7 others previously recorded. Examples with frame cut down to inner-fillet border in 6 known locations, with 4 others formerly reported. Rectangular casts with all border elements cut away in 4 collections, with 3 previously recorded. | Molinier 1886, 1:154, no. 216; not in Pope-Hennessy 1965; Lewis 1989:140, no. III.A.4 |
| 54 | Hercules and the Nemean Lion, in a rectangular frame (c. 1505/1510) | No image available | 5.7 x 6.4; bronze | Casts with full frame in 14 known locations, with 6 formerly reported. Examples with frame trimmed to inner-fillet molding in 2 known locations, with 3 others formerly recorded; another has a wide flange, and 4 more omit the frame altogether. A reduced circular variant in Frankfurt, with 2 others formerly reported. | Molinier 1886, 1:146, no. 199; Pope-Hennessy 1965:55, no. 184; Lewis 1989:140, no. III.A.3 |
| 55 | Allegory of Architecture (c. 1508/1510) | No image available | 4.7 diam.; bronze | Unique in the NGA, Washington | Molinier 1886, 2:94, no. 518; Pope-Hennessy 1965:106, no. 385; Lewis 1989:141, no. V.B.1 |
| 56 | Saint George and the Dragon | No image available | figural group by Moderno, c. 1509/1515; background/frame by the shop of Andrea Riccio, c. 1515/1520 | Examples in 6 collections (including one incorporated on a triangular utensil in the Victoria and Albert Museum, London), with 2 others formerly recorded | Molinier 1886, 1:166, no. 225; Pope-Hennessy 1965:68, no. 228; not in Lewis 1989 |
| 57 | Alexander the Great as Jupiter Ammon (c. 1510 or just after) | No image available | 3.4 x 2.7; bronze | Casts of the portrait alone in 8 known collections, with 2 others formerly reported. A cast at the NGA, Washington, uniquely embellished by an integral border of wine-making putti (overall dimensions 6.0 x 5.2). | Not in Molinier 1886; Pope-Hennessy 1965:16, no. 43; not in Lewis 1989 |
| 58 | A Senatorial Triumph, Surrounded by Hunting Scenes (early 16th century) | No image available | 7.6 diam.; bronze | Examples in 3 known locations, with 4 others formerly reported | Bange 1922:68, no. 491; Lewis 1987:82, fig. 8 |
| 59 | Bust of Lucretia (early 16th century) | National Gallery of Art, Washington | 5.1 diam.; bronze | Six casts of the original design in known repositories, with 2 others formerly recorded. Bordered specimens in 4 collections, with 1 other formerly reported. Reduced variants on an ornamental frieze in Berlin and on a dagger hilt in the Victoria and Albert Museum, London. | Molinier 1886, 1:152, no. 213; Pope-Hennessy 1965:56, no. 185; Lewis 1989:141, no. V.B.2 |
| 60 | A Youth Chained on a Flaming Pyre (early 16th century) | Private Collection | 3.6 diam.; bronze | Found in 3 collections, with a 4th formerly recorded | Molinier 1886, 2:202, no. 752; not in Pope-Hennessy 1965; not in Lewis 1989 |
| 61 | A Kneeling Nude Figure (probably early 16th century) | National Gallery of Art, Washington | 4.0 diam.; bronze | Apparently unique, at the NGA in Washington | Pope-Hennessy 1965:111, no. 411; not in Lewis 1989 |

== By the Master of the Labors of Hercules ==
| No. | Title and Date | Image | Dimensions, Material, Signature | Known Examples and Locations | References |
|---|---|---|---|---|---|
| 62 | The Infant Hercules Strangling the Serpents (c. 1500/1515) | National Gallery of Art, Washington | 9.0 x 7.8; bronze | Examples in four known repositories, with one other formerly reported. Reproduced on a marble banqueting table for the Castello Giustinian at Roncade (near Treviso) of c. 1515. | Molinier 1886, 1.143, no. 193; Pope-Hennessy 1965:54, no. 177; Lewis 1989:141, no. V.A.1 |
| 63 | Kneeling Hercules with the Nemean Lion (probably before 1507) | No image available | 7.9 x 6.6; bronze | Specimens in 16 known repositories, with 8 others recorded. Probably reproduced on the 1507 Porta della Rana at Como Cathedral. See no. 39 for the other possibility. | Molinier 1886, 1:145, no. 197; Pope-Hennessy 1965:51, no. 179; Lewis 1989:"140, no. I.44" (as mistake: should be p. 141, no. V.1a) |
| 64 | Hercules and the Lernaean Hydra (before 1507) | National Gallery of Art, Washington | 9.7 x 7.8; bronze | Examples in 12 repositories, with 10 others formerly reported. Reproduced in 1507 on the Porta della Rana at Como Cathedral. | Molinier 1886, 1:144, no. 196; Pope-Hennessy 1965:54, no. 178; Lewis 1989:141, no. V.A.2 |
| 65 | Hercules Overcoming Antaeus, with a Tree Stump (c. 1500/1505) | Museo Nazionale, Ravenna | 9.7 x 7.7; bronze | Examples in 15 collections, with 7 others reported | Molinier 1886, 1:??, no. 203; Pope-Hennessy 1965:54, no. 180; Lewis 1989:141, no. V.A.3 |

== By the Master of the Augmented Roundels ==
| No. | Title | Image | Dimensions, Material, Signature | Known Examples and Locations | References |
|---|---|---|---|---|---|
| 66 | Hercules Overcoming Antaeus, before an Arena (c. 1510/1515[?]) | Museo del Bargello, Florence | 10.5 diam.; bronze | Examples in 4 known repositories | Mentioned in Molinier? Lewis 1989:140, no. III.B.1 |
| 67 | Standing Hercules with the Nemean Lion, before a Caverned Landscape (c. 1510/1515[?]) | No image available | 10.5 diam.; bronze | Casts in 6 known repositories, with 4 others formerly reported | Molinier 1886, 1:??, no. 198; Pope-Hennessy 1965:50, no. 161; Lewis 1989:140, no. III.B.2 |
| 68 | Mars and Victory, before a Ruined Arcade (c. 1510/1515[?]) | National Gallery of Art, Washington | 10.5 diam.; bronze | Examples in 8 known repositories, with 5 others formerly recorded | Molinier 1886, 1:??, no. 186; Pope-Hennessy 1965:49, no. 158; Lewis 1989: 140, no. III.B.3 |
| 69 | David and a Companion with the Dead Goliath, before a Statue of Mars (c. 1510/1515[?]) | National Gallery of Art, Washington | 10.6 diam.; bronze | Examples in five known repositories, with three others formerly reported | Molinier 1886, 1:??, no. 58; Pope-Hennessy 1965:44, no. 141; Lewis 1989:140, no. III.B.4 |
| 70 | Fall of Phaeton, before a Sculptured Arcade (c. 1510/1515[?]) | No image available | 9.7 diam.; bronze | Examples in 4 known locations, with 1 formerly recorded | Mentioned in Molinier? Lewis 1989:140, no. III.B.5 |
| 71 | Infant Hercules Strangling the Serpents (c. 1510/1515[?]) | No image available | 10.5 diam.; bronze | Examples in five known repositories, with one other formerly reported | Mentioned in Molinier? Not in Lewis 1989 |
| 72 | Hercules and the Lernaean Hydra (c. 1510/1515[?]) | No image available | 10.5 diam.; bronze | Example at the Bibliotheque Nationale, Paris? | Mentioned in Molinier? Not in Lewis 1989 |

== Bibliography ==
- Bange, Ernst Friedrich (1922). Staatliche Museen zu Berlin. Beschreibung der Bildwerke der christlichen Epochen. 3rd ed., vol. 2: Die italienische Bronzen der Renaissance und des Barock. Part 2: Reliefs und Plaketten. Berlin and Leipzig.
- Bode, Wilhelm von (1904). Königliche Museen zu Berlin. Beschreibung der Bildwerke der christliche Epochen. 2nd ed., vol. 2: Die italienischen Bronzen. Berlin.
- Hill, George Francis (1930). A Corpus of Italian Medals of the Renaissance before Cellini. 2 vols. London.
- Leithe-Jasper, Manfred (1986). Renaissance Master Bronzes from the Collection of the Kunsthistorisches Museum, Vienna. Exhibition catalogue, National Gallery of Art. Washington, DC.
- Lewis, Douglas; Struble, Amy (2018). "A New Redemptive Symbolism in Moderno's Plaquettes". The Medal 72 (Spring): 42–55.
- Maclagan, Eric R. D. (1924). Victoria and Albert Museum, Department of Architecture and Sculpture. Catalogue of Italian Plaquettes. London.
- Molinier, Émile (1886). Les Bronzes de la Renaissance. Les plaquettes: catalogue raisonné. 2 vols. Paris.
- Planiscig, Leo (1924). Kunsthistorisches Museum in Wien. Sammlung für Plastik und Kunstgewerbe. Die Bronzeplastiken: Statuetten, Reliefs, Geräte und Plaketten. Vienna.
- Pope-Hennessy, John Wyndham (1965). Renaissance Bronzes from the Samuel H. Kress Collection: Reliefs, Plaquettes, Statuettes, Utensils, and Mortars. London.
- Reinach, Salomon (1895). Pierres Gravées. Paris.
- Wixom, William D. (1975). Renaissance Bronzes from Ohio Collections. Exhibition catalogue, Cleveland Museum of Art. Cleveland.
