= Domenico Poggini =

Italian sculptor

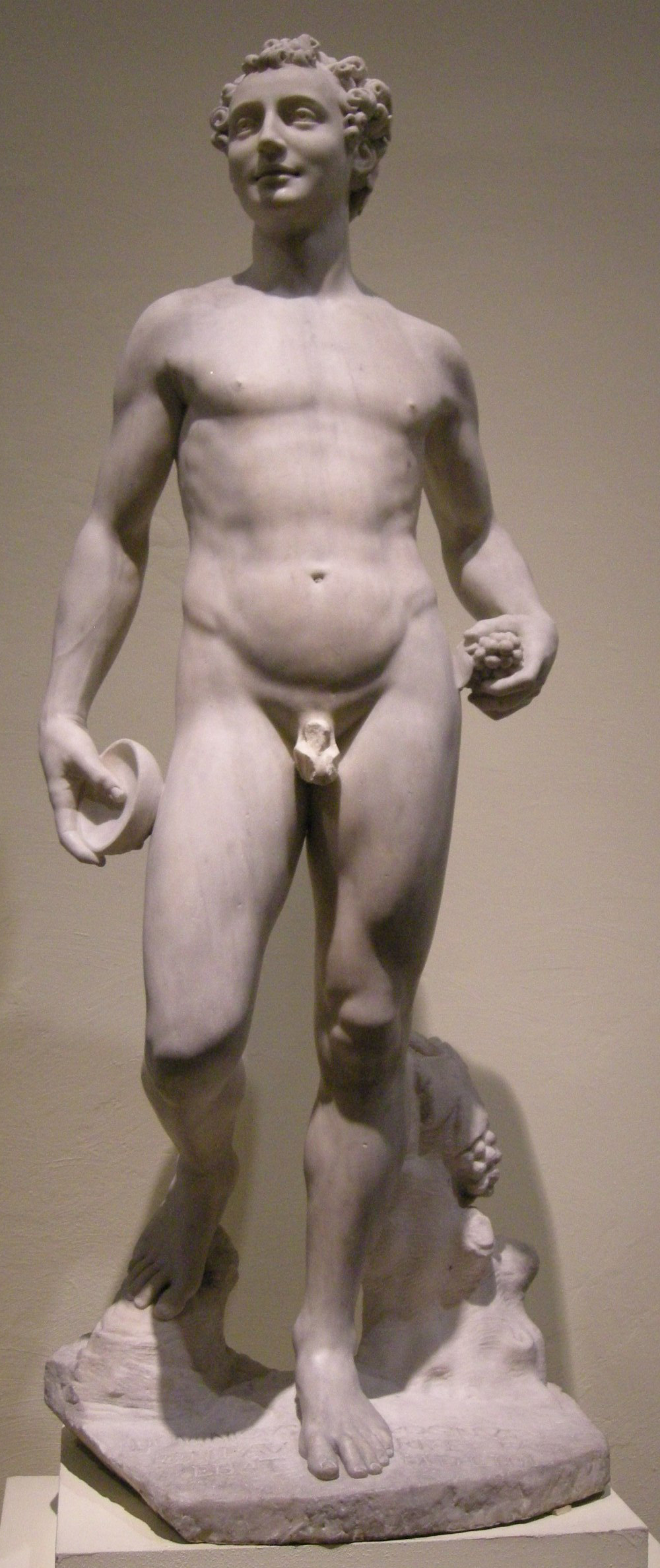
Bacchus by Domenico Poggini, 1554

Domenico Poggini (1520–1590) was an Italian sculptor, engraver, medallist, goldsmith, and poet.

Poggini was born in Florence. His father Michele Poggini and brother Giampaolo Poggini were also artists. In 1556 he was appointed diecutter for the Florentine Mint. In 1588 he was appointed chief engraver at the mint in Rome by Pope Sixtus V. He died in Rome 1590. Some of his works can be seen at the British Museum.
