= Della Robbia =

Della Robbia is a surname. Notable people with the surname include:

- Luca della Robbia (1400–1481), Italian sculptor
- Andrea della Robbia (1435–1525), Italian sculptor, nephew of Luca
- Giovanni della Robbia (1469–1529), son of Andrea
- Girolamo della Robbia (1488–1566), son of Andrea

== See also ==
- Della Robbia Pottery (1894–1906), an English Arts and Crafts Movement pottery (inspired by the work of Luca della Robbia and his family)
- Della Robbia, American line of pottery produced by Roseville pottery
- Odd Della Robbia, a character in Code Lyoko
- Della Robbia (typeface), a typeface designed by Thomas Maitland Cleland
