= Radicofani =

- Comune
- Comune di Radicofani
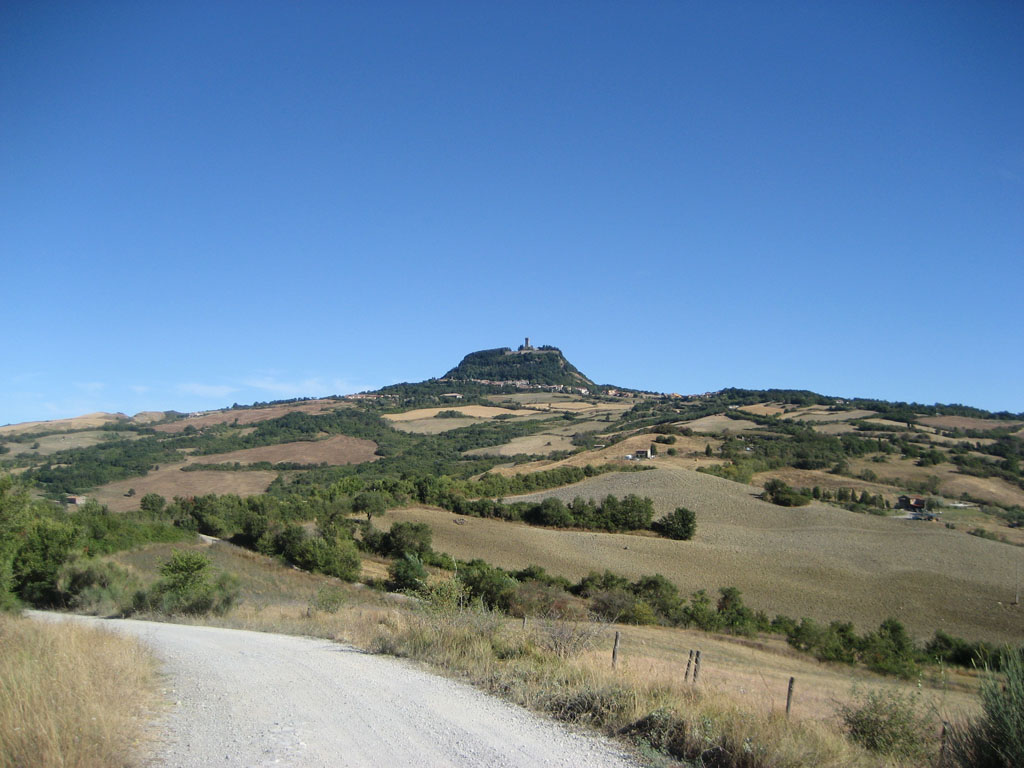
- View of Radicofani

- Coat of arms

- Location within Italy Location within Tuscany
- Coordinates: 42°54′N 11°46′E
- Country: Italy
- Region: Tuscany
- Province: Siena (SI)
- Frazioni: Contignano

Government
  - Mayor: Francesco Fabbrizzi

Area
  - Total: 85.2 km^{2} (32.9 sq mi)
- Elevation: 814 m (2,671 ft)

Population (31 December 2016)
  - Total: 1,088
  - Density: 12.8/km^{2} (33.1/sq mi)
- Demonym: Radicofanesi
- Time zone: UTC+1 (CET)
  - Summer (DST): UTC+2 (CEST)
- Postal code: 53040
- Dialing code: 0578
- Website: Official website

Radicofani (Italian pronunciation: [radiˈkɔːfani]) is a comune in the Province of Siena in the Italian region Tuscany, located in the natural park of Val d'Orcia about 110 kilometres (68 mi) southeast of Florence and about 60 kilometres (37 mi) southeast of Siena.

Radicofani borders the following municipalities: Abbadia San Salvatore, Castiglione d'Orcia, Pienza, San Casciano dei Bagni, Sarteano.

== Climate ==
Climate is characterized by relatively high temperatures and evenly distributed precipitation throughout the year. The Köppen Climate Classification subtype for this climate is Cfa (Humid Subtropical Climate).

Climate data for Radicofani
Month	Jan	Feb	Mar	Apr	May	Jun	Jul	Aug	Sep	Oct	Nov	Dec	Year
Mean daily maximum °C (°F)	6 (42)	6 (42)	8 (47)	12 (53)	17 (62)	21 (69)	24 (76)	24 (76)	21 (69)	15 (59)	10 (50)	7 (44)	14 (57)
Mean daily minimum °C (°F)	1 (33)	1 (33)	2 (36)	5 (41)	9 (49)	13 (55)	16 (61)	16 (61)	13 (56)	9 (49)	5 (41)	2 (36)	8 (46)
Average precipitation mm (inches)	46 (1.8)	51 (2)	48 (1.9)	53 (2.1)	53 (2.1)	36 (1.4)	36 (1.4)	46 (1.8)	58 (2.3)	69 (2.7)	76 (3)	56 (2.2)	630 (24.7)
Average precipitation days	7	7.4	7.7	7.9	8.4	7	3.9	5.1	5.6	7.1	8.6	8.2	83.9
Source: Weatherbase

== Demographic evolution ==
Historical Population of Radicofani

== Main sights ==
The main landmark of Radicofani is its Rocca (Castle), of Carolingian origin, documented since 978 as the Castle of Ghino di Tacco. Occupying the highest point of a hill, at 896 metres (2,940 ft), it was restored after the conquest from the Grand Duchy of Tuscany (1560–67). It has two lines of walls: the external one has a pentagonal shape, while the inner one is triangular, with three ruined towers at each corner and a cassero (donjon) which can be visited.

Also notable is the Romanesque church of San Pietro, with a nave housing works by Andrea della Robbia, Benedetto Buglioni and Santi Buglioni. Also by della Robbia is the precious Madonna with Saints at the high altar of the church of Sant'Agata. Just to the south of town is the Bosco Isabella.

== Municipal government ==
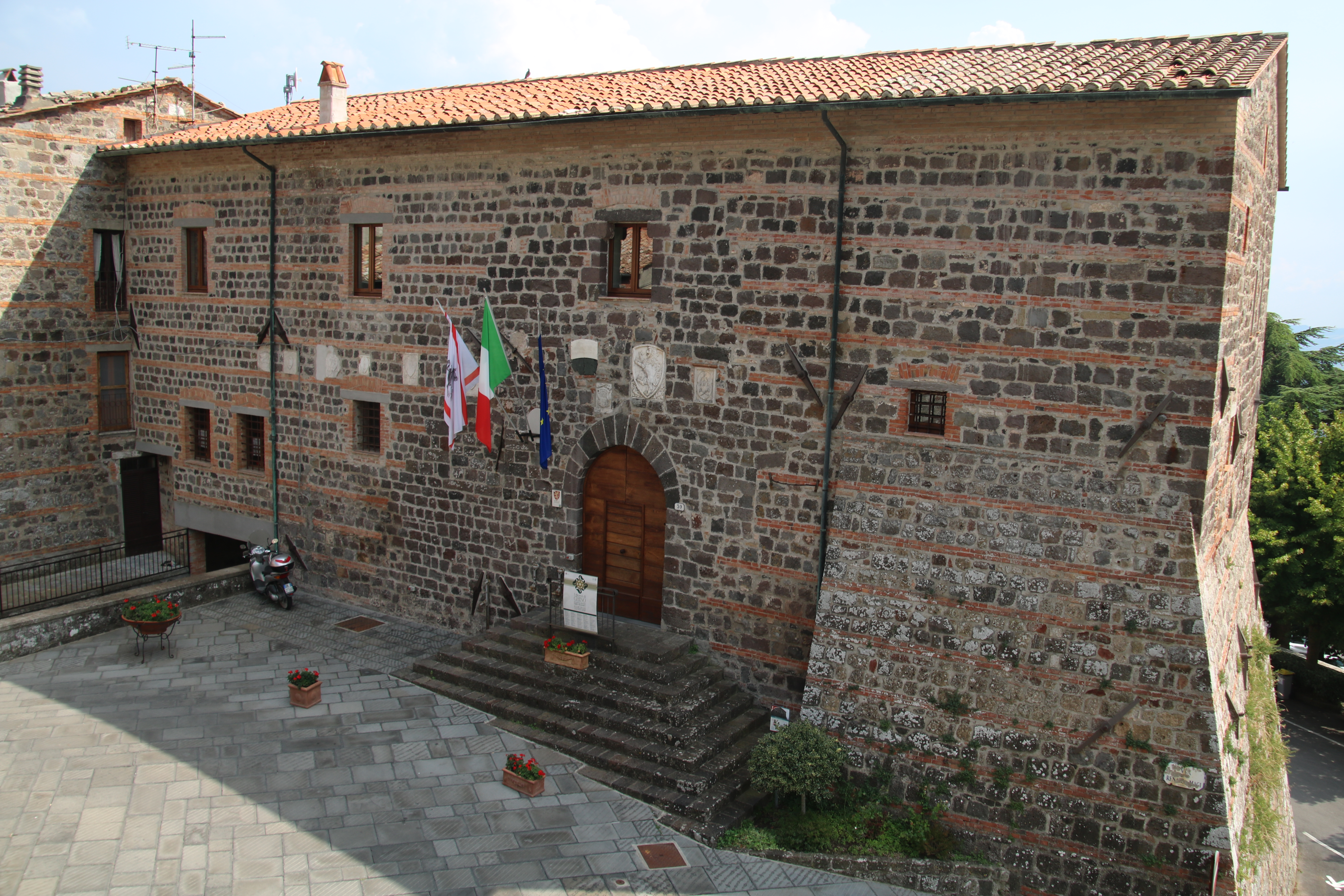
The Town Hall.

Radicofani is headed by a mayor (sindaco) assisted by a legislative body, the consiglio comunale, and an executive body, the giunta comunale. Since 1995 the mayor and members of the consiglio comunale are directly elected together by resident citizens, while from 1945 to 1995 the mayor was chosen by the legislative body. The giunta comunale is chaired by the mayor, who appoints others members, called assessori. The offices of the comune are housed in a building usually called the municipio or palazzo comunale.

Since 1995 the mayor of Radicofani is directly elected by citizens, originally every four, then every five years. The current mayor is Francesco Fabbrizzi (PD), elected on 25 May 2014 and re-elected on 26 May 2019 and on 9 June 2024.

Mayor	Term start	Term end	Party
Andrea Bonsignori	24 April 1995	14 June 2004	DS
Massimo Magrini	14 June 2004	26 May 2014	PD
Francesco Fabbrizzi	26 May 2014	incumbent	PD

== Gallery ==
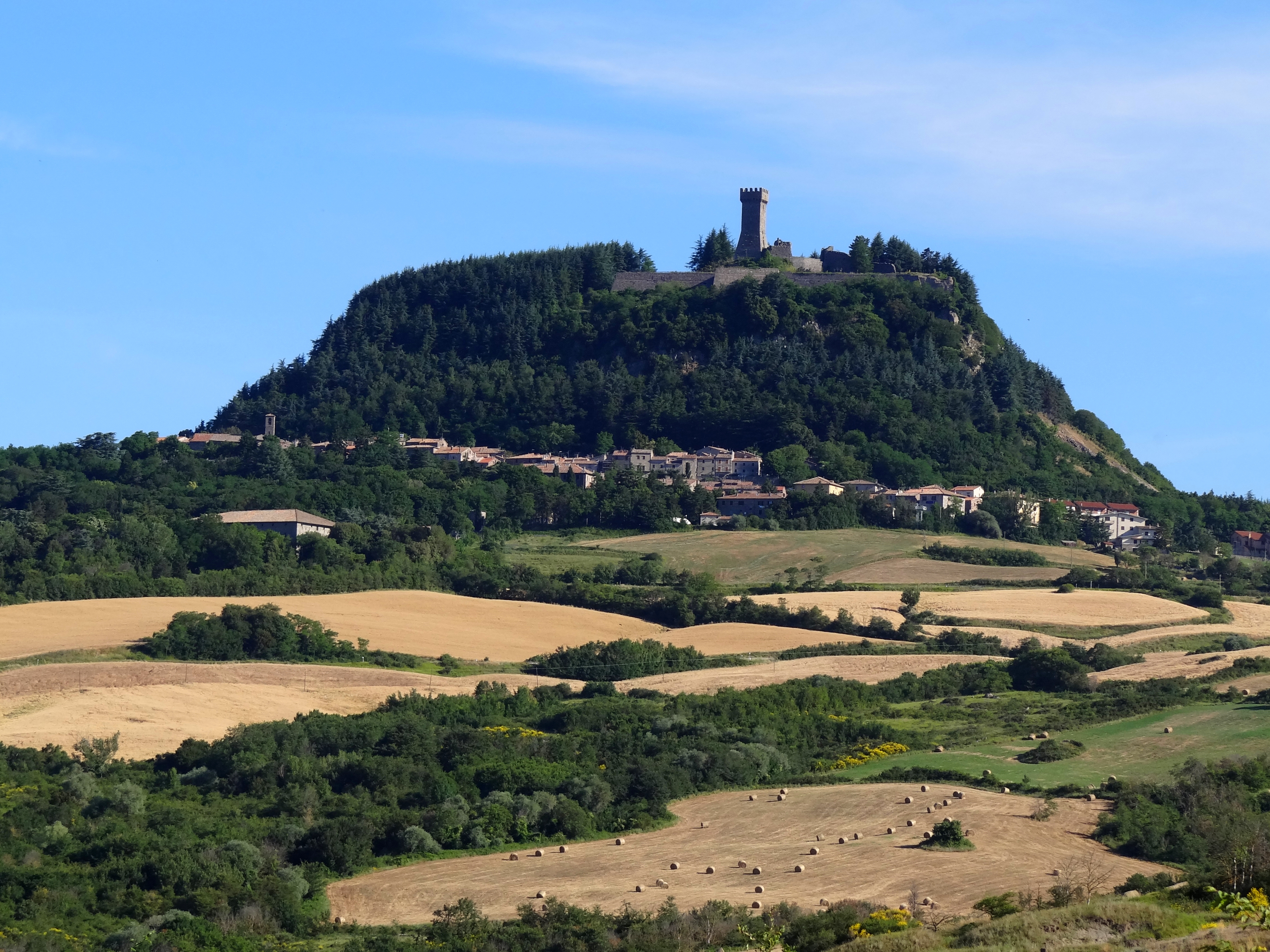

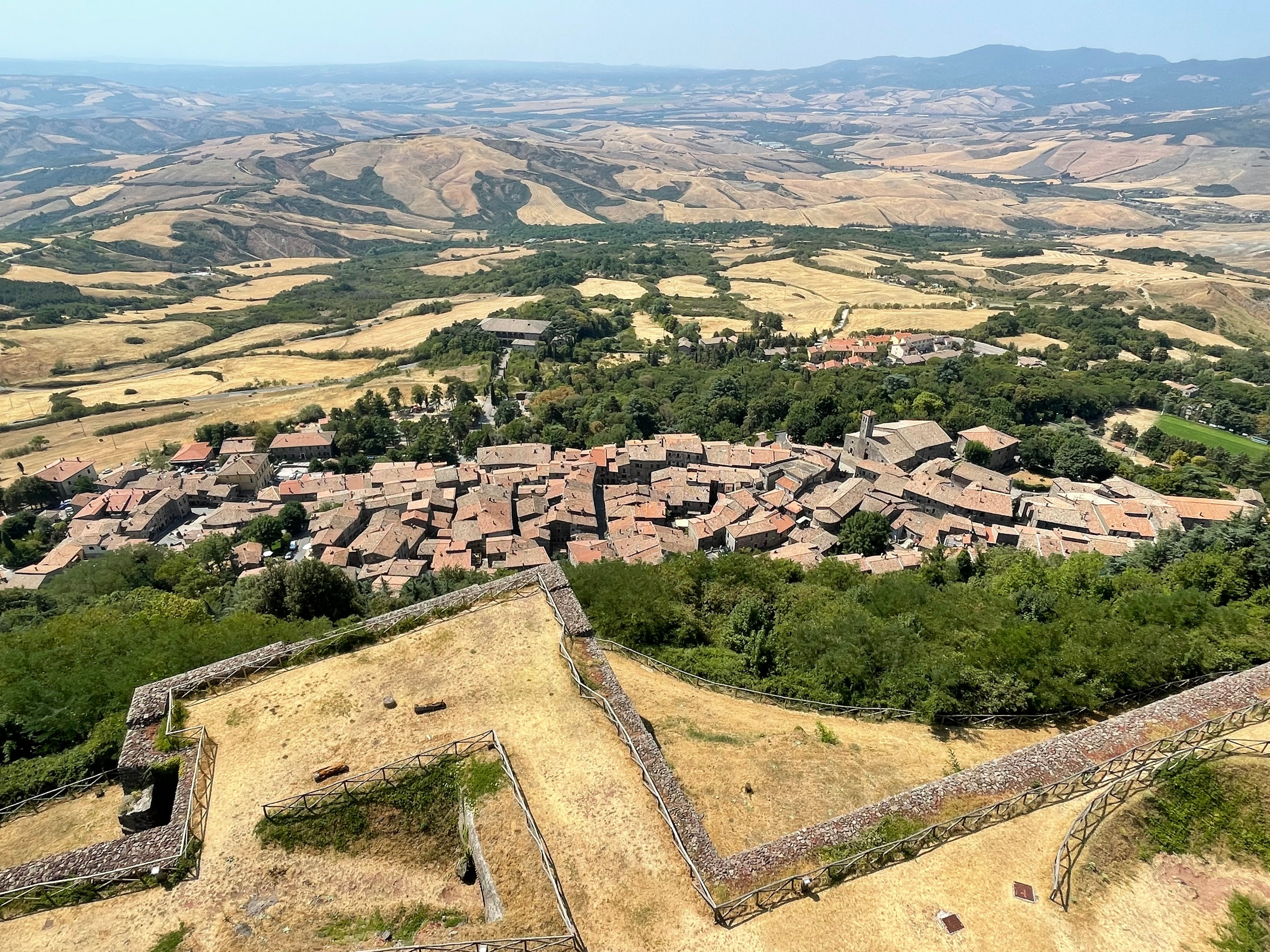

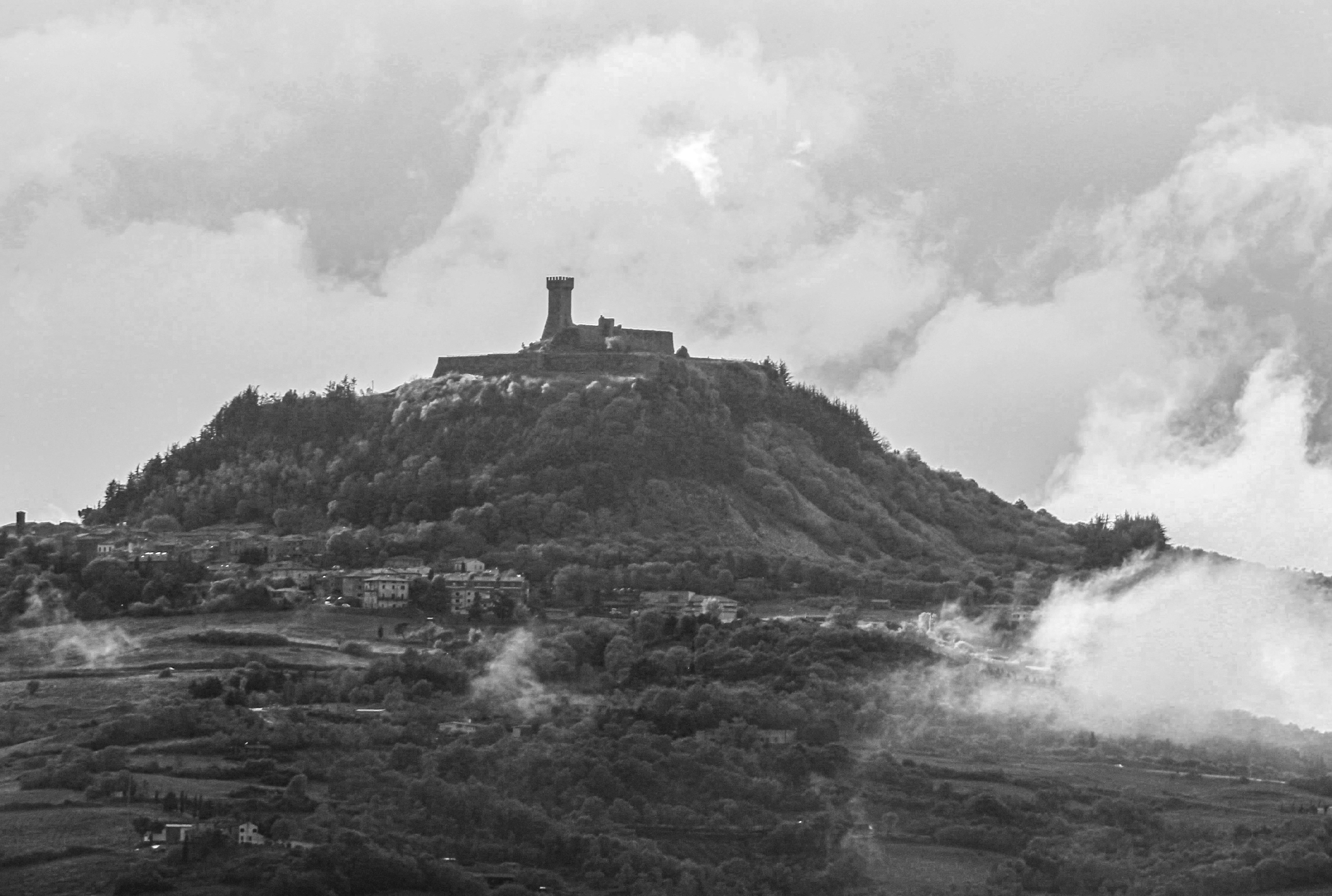

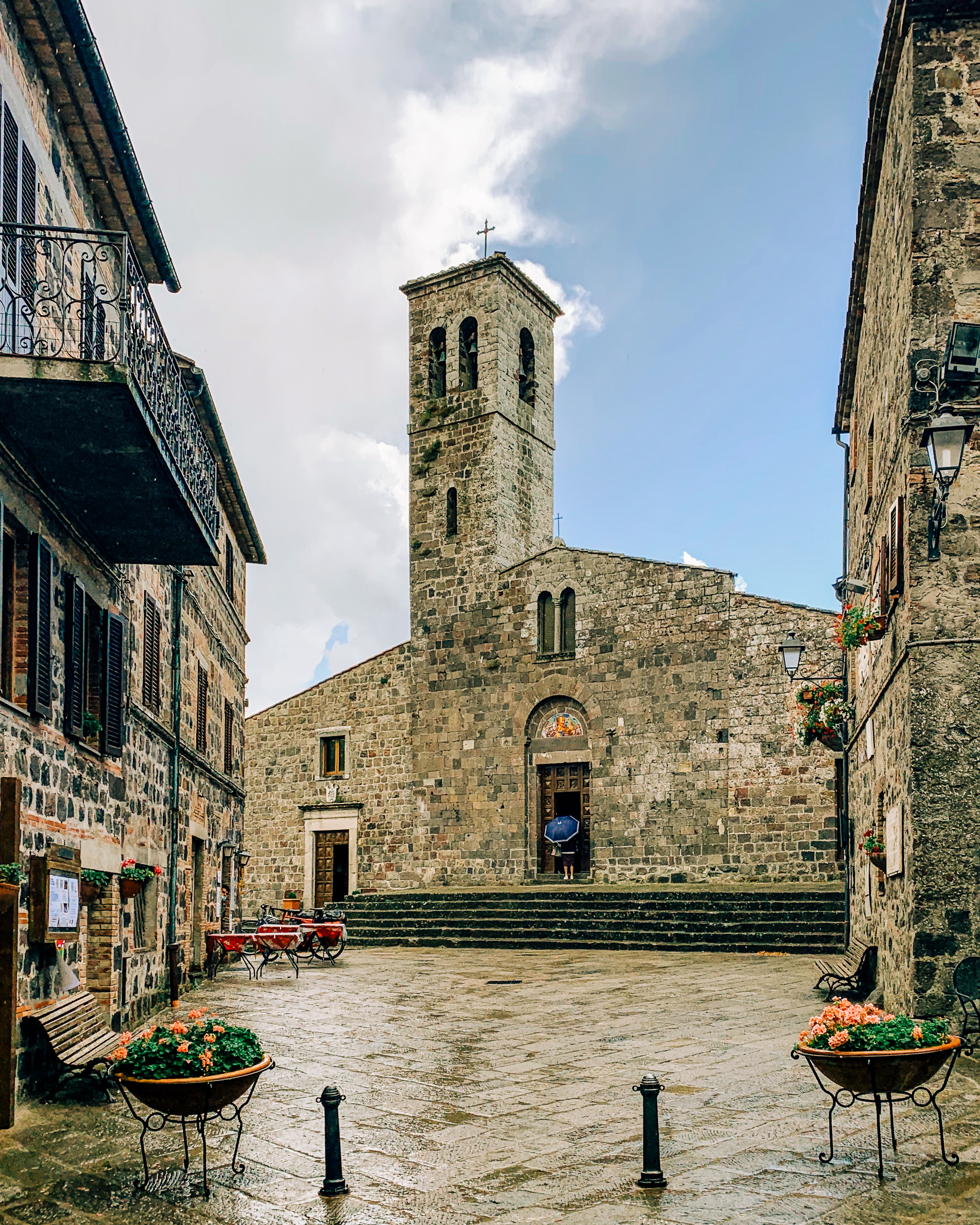

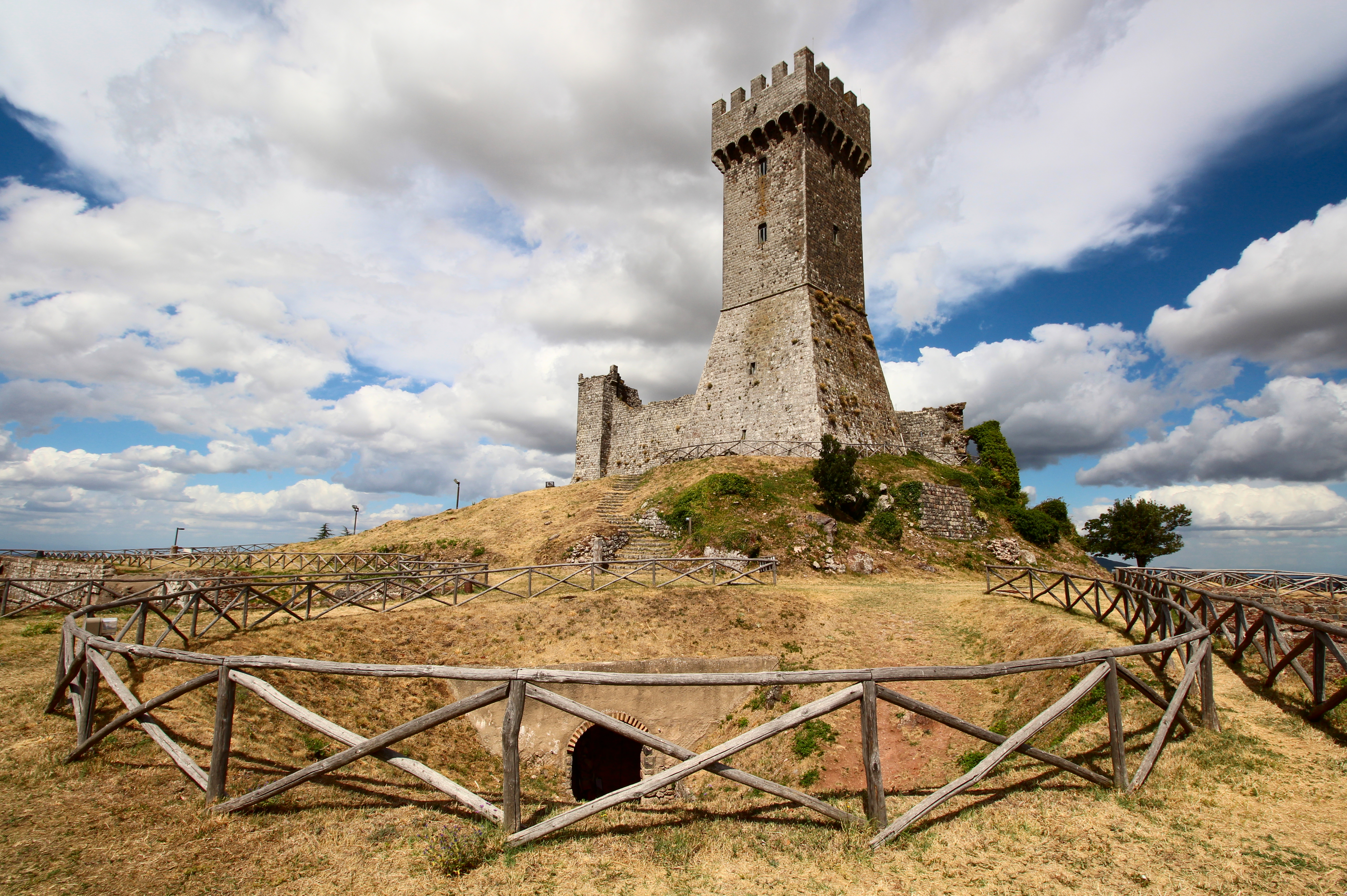

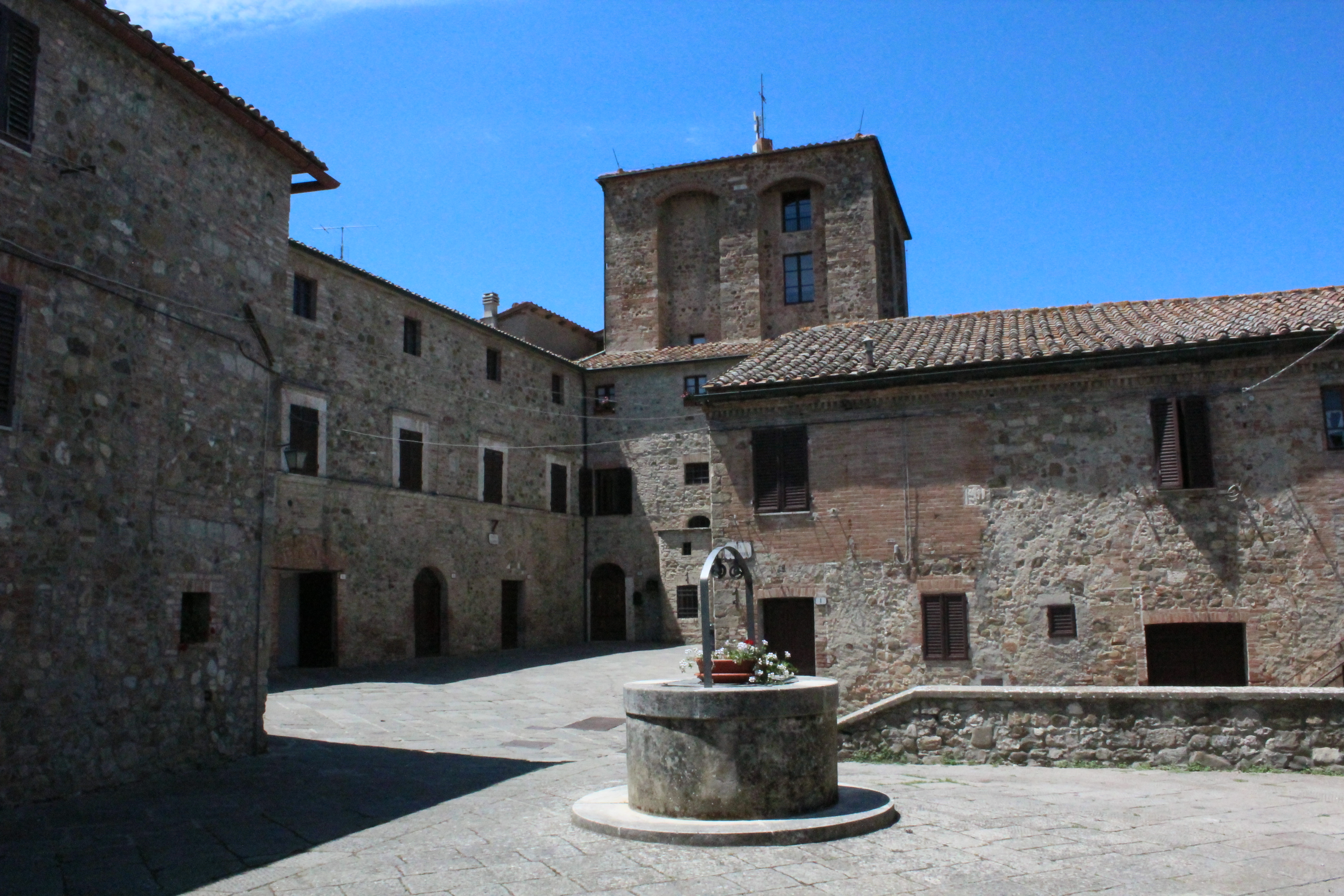
