= Buglioni =

Buglioni is a surname. Notable people with the surname include:

- Benedetto Buglioni (1459/1460–1521), Italian sculptor
- Frank Buglioni (born 1989), British boxer
- Jenna Buglioni (born 2002), Canadian ice hockey player
- Paolo Buglioni (born 1950), Italian actor and voice actor
- Santi Buglioni (1494–1576), Italian sculptor, nephew of Benedetto
