= Benedetto Buglioni =

Italian sculptor

- Born: c. 1461; Florence, Florentine Republic
- Died: c. 1521; Florence, Florentine Republic
- Known for: Glazed terracotta sculptures
- Movement: Renaissance

Benedetto Buglioni (1459/1460–1521) was an important Italian Renaissance sculptor specialised in glazed terracotta.

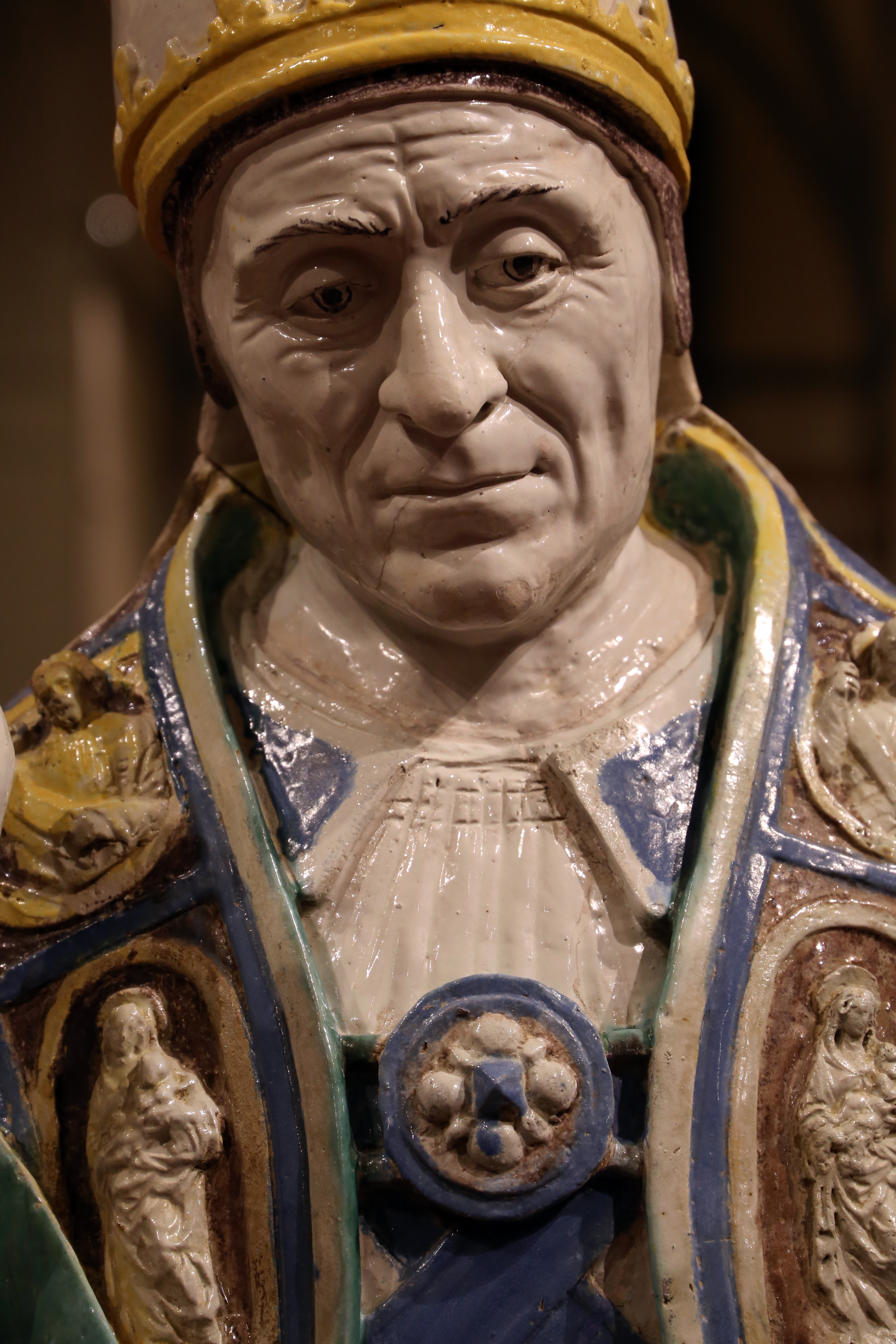
Bust of Saint Linus, 1490–1510, Museo diocesano, Volterra

Madonna and Child, Cleveland Museum of Art

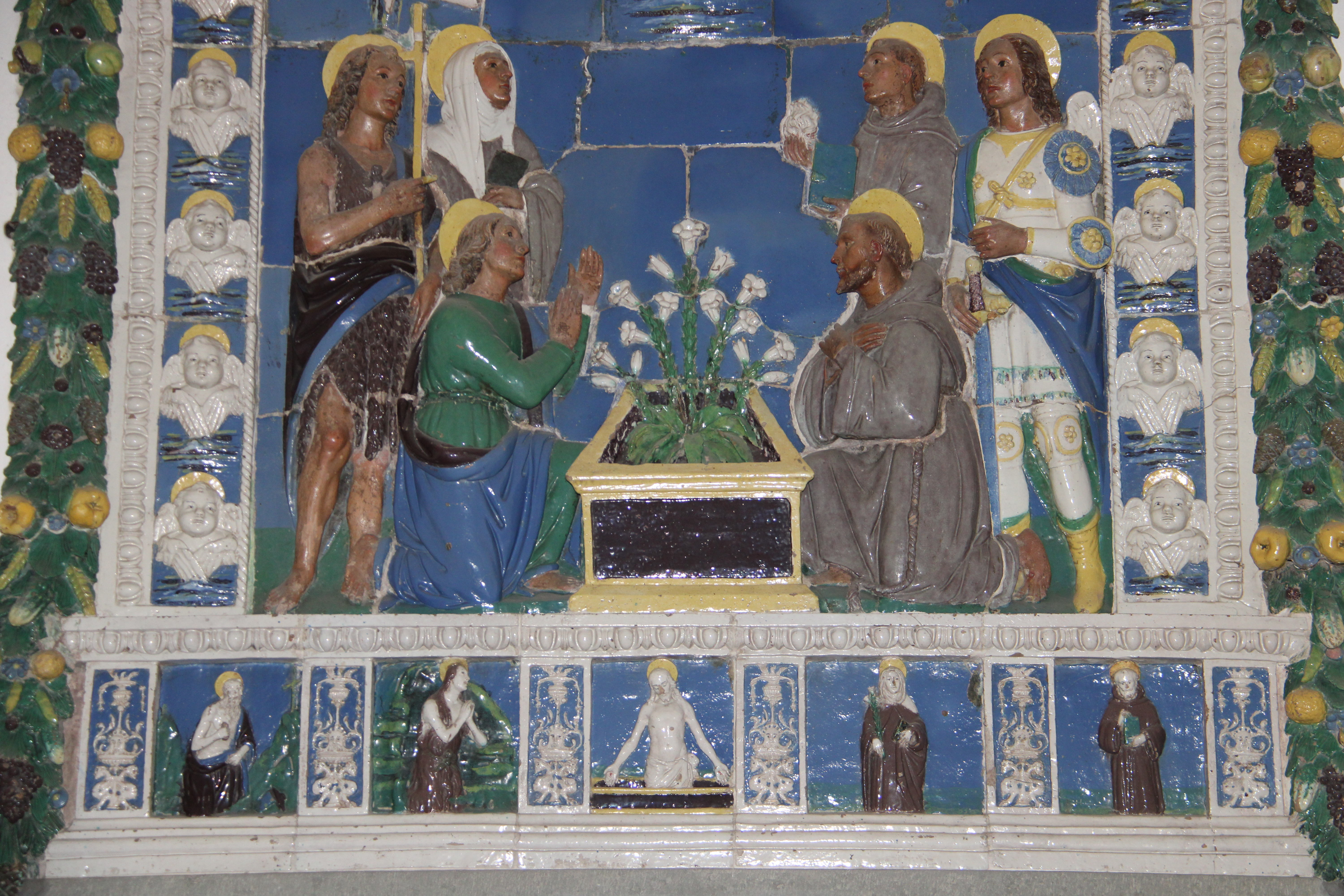
Madonna of the Girdle, c. 1510, Church of Saint Elizabeth, Barga

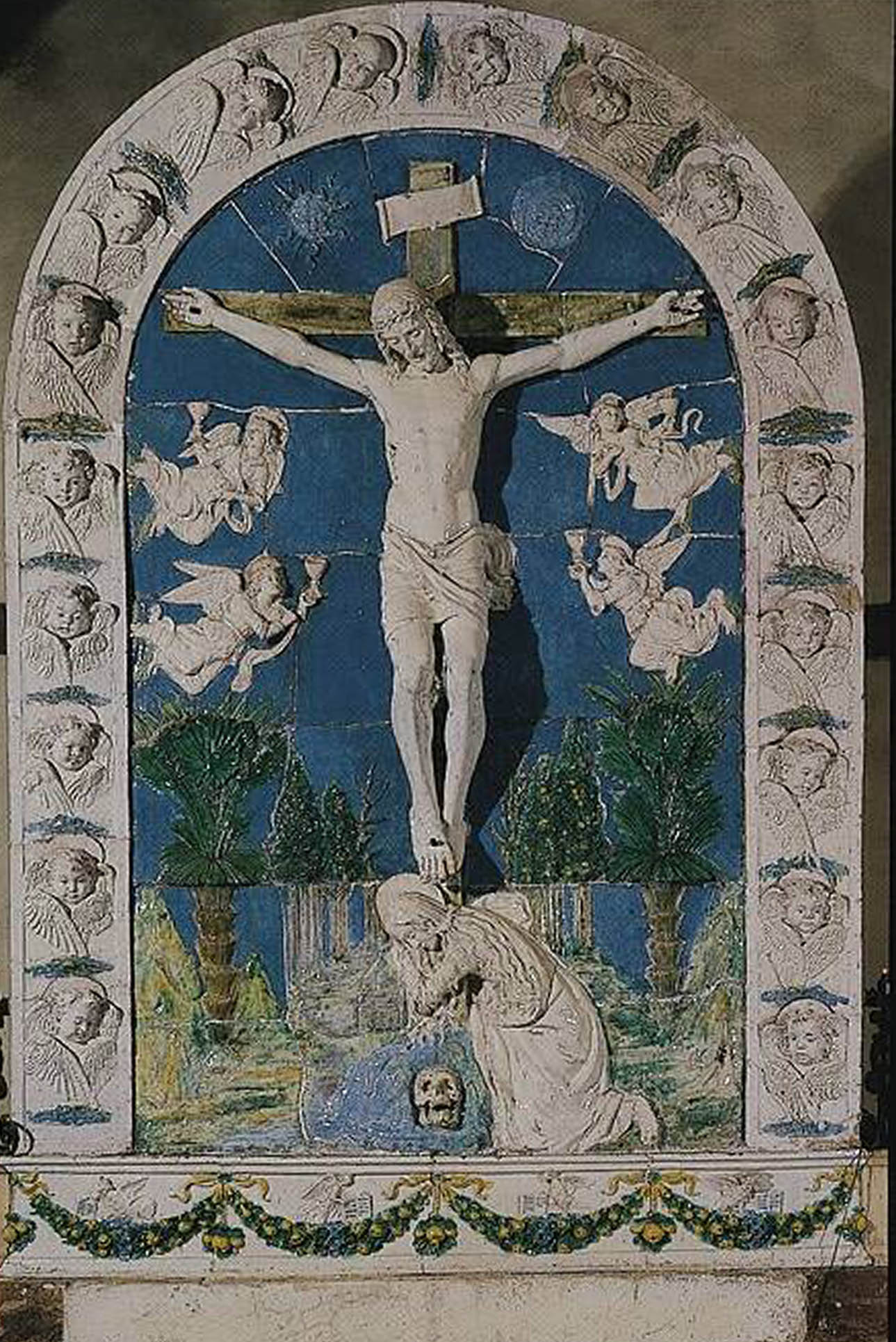
Crucifixion with Mary Magdalene, Radicofani

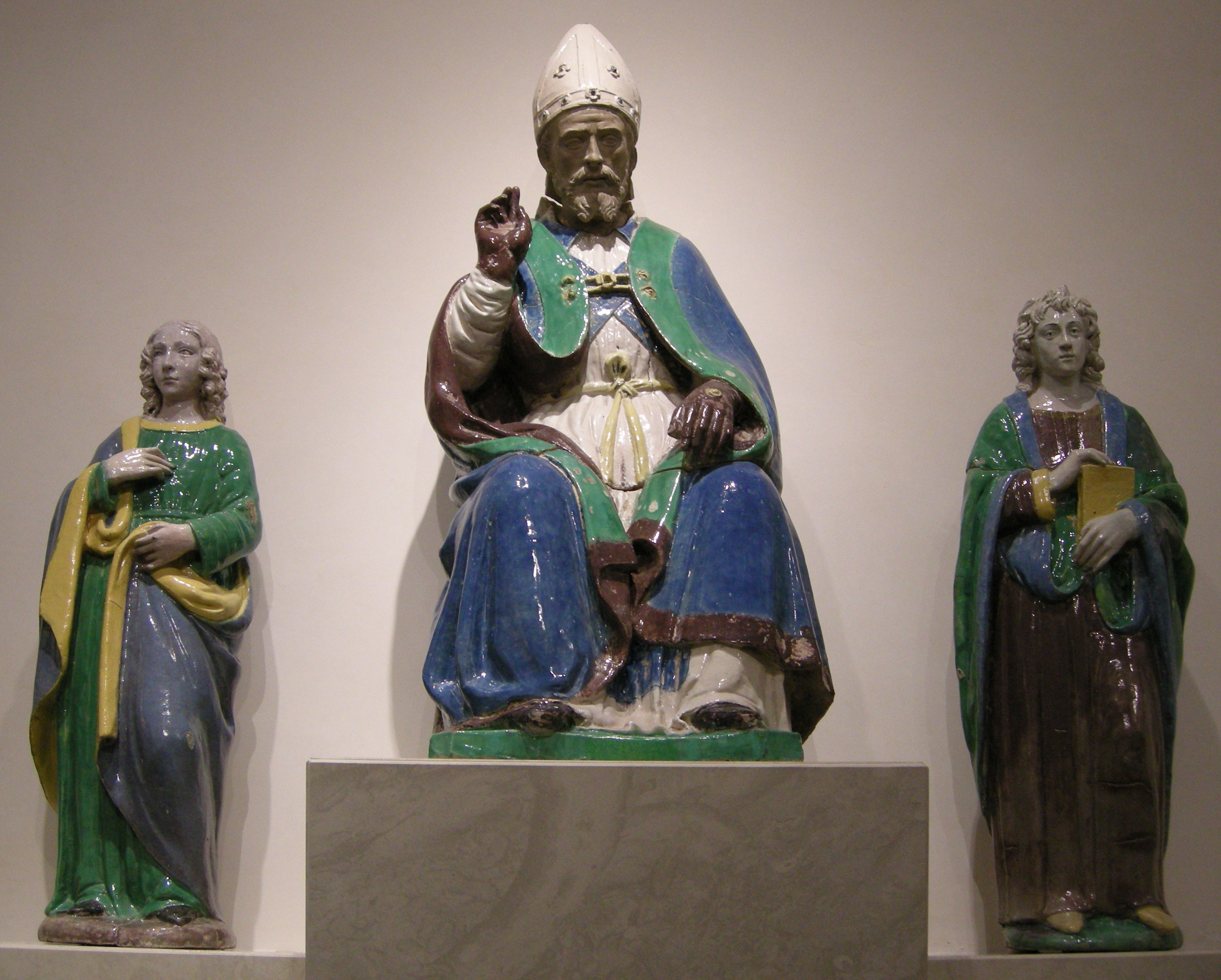
St. Romulus and Two Accompanying Martyrs, 1515–1520

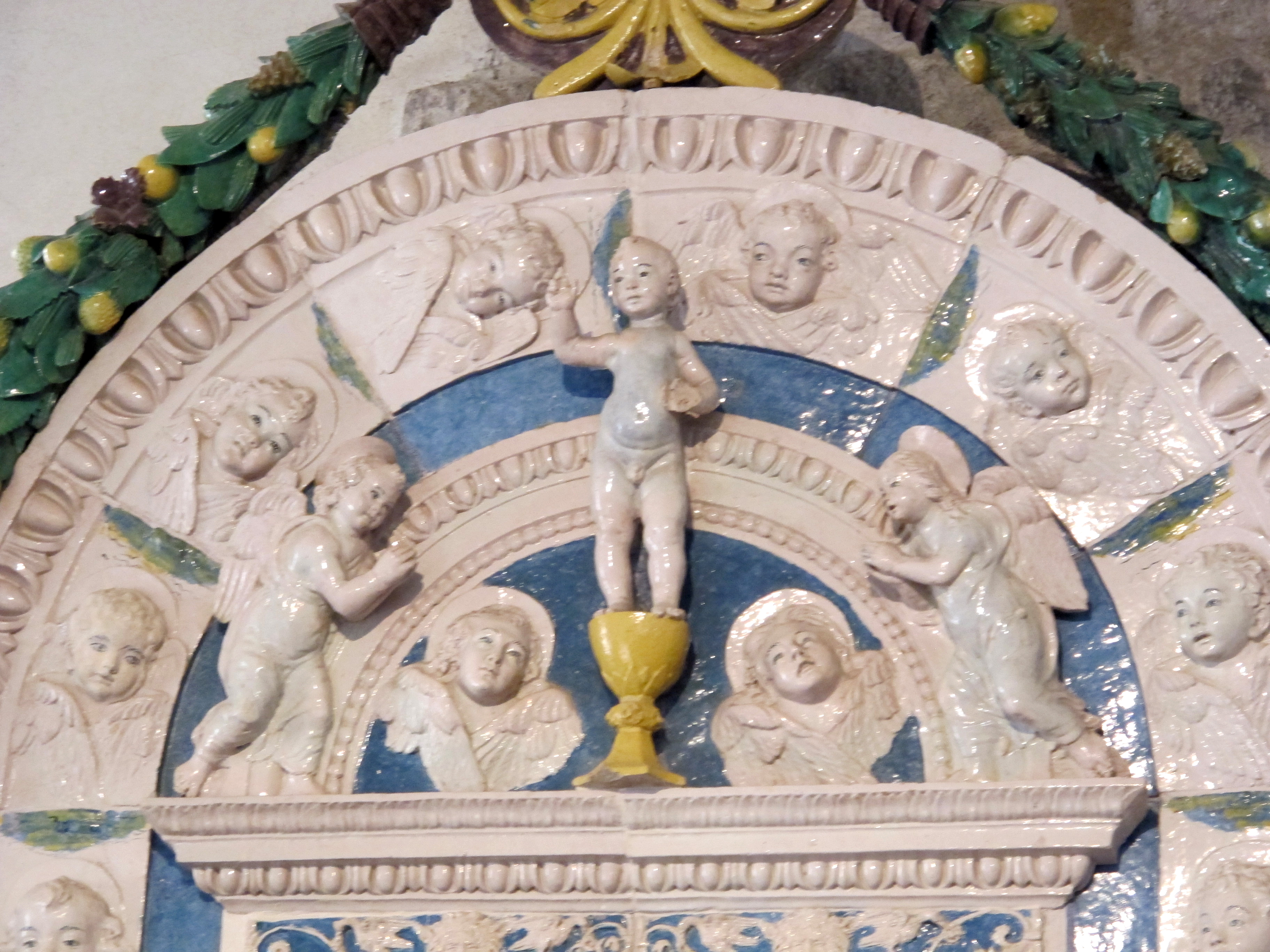
Ciborium, Santa Cristina, Bolsena

== Life and career ==
He was born in Florence around 1461 as a son of another sculptor, Giovanni di Bernardo, and a Caterina. According to Giorgio Vasari, "from a woman, who came out of the house of Andrea della Robbia, he got the secret of glazed earthenware". Probably a young pupil in the workshop of Luca della Robbia and Andrea della Robbia, he moved away to take their technique outside Florence. The coat-of-arms of Pope Innocent VIII, datable to the years between 1484 and 1492, now in the Borgia rooms in the Vatican, can in fact be attributed to him, while the Descent of Christ in Limbo, for Santa Maria dei Servi (Annunziata) in Florence, probably dates from the same period. This is perhaps his first work as an independent master: only a record in the books of the Servi convent from 1484 of it remains.

In the early 1480s Buglioni and his brother opened their own studio, and jointly worked on a number of commissions for various churches in the area. This includes works for the Church of Ognissanti, the church of San Pietro in Radicofani, and the Church of Santa Lucia a Settimello in Calenzano.

Beginning in 1487, Buglioni did terracotta work for the cathedral and the church of San Pietro in Perugia; in 1487 the busts of Isaiah and David for the chapel of San Giuseppe in Perugia cathedral; in 1487-1488, again for Sait Peter's, three medallions, with Saint Peter, the Monogram of Jesus and Saint Benedict, and an altarpiece with Christ and the Samaritan Woman.

These works have remained to us as evidence of his youthful manner, rather pure and simple, which already reveals in him not only familiarity with the sculptures of della Robbia, but a certain mature experience of much Florentine sculptural activity.

Buglioni was in Florence in 1504, as he was part of the commission on 25 January to choose the site for Michelangelo's David.

His masterpiece is the statue of St. Christine in the collegiate church of Bolsena, probably executed between 1503 and 1508: the saint lies on her sarcophagus, delicate and harmoniously composed in her sweet sleep of death and Christian peace. In all likelihood, the artist also executed the ciborium for the collegiate church of Bolsena, which, enlarged by the rich garland and the predella, constitutes the altarpiece: in the perspective flight of the arch and in the benedictory Jesus, it recalls the great tradition of Florentine sculpture, the one particularly linked to the name of Desiderio da Settignano. In the church of S. Pietro in Radicofani, there is a Crucifix with Mary Magdalene that can be attributed to B. for the gentleness of certain passages, for that of its inscription in a country of trees, studied and distant in perspective.

There are numerous works attributed to Buglioni, even before they were considered to be by Giovanni della Robbia: thus the lunette with St. Mary of Egypt, now kept in the Museo dell'Opera del duomo in Florence, where the contours of the female figure and the village are soft, almost vibrant with even pictorial value, and give this work an evanescent lability of vision, unique, perhaps, in the vast field of ceramics. This is a whole world of images, expressions, feelings unknown to Giovanni della Robbia, a far more common disseminator of Della Robbia's industry. The statuettes of St. Romulus and his companions in the cathedral of Fiesole, the Madonna and Child on the clouds in the Bargello, the coat-of-arms of the Spedale del Ceppo in Pistoia, which was paid to him on 26 March 1515, can still be safely attributed to him. And for the same Spedale he executed the lunette with the Coronation of Mary, a work testified by numerous payment documents . Stylistically related to this is the lunette of All Saints' Day in Florence, also representing the Coronation of Mary, in a larger setting and with a greater number of figures. The Crucifix on the high altar of S. Miniato al Monte and, in the same church, a Madonna adored by two monks are also attributed to Buglioni.

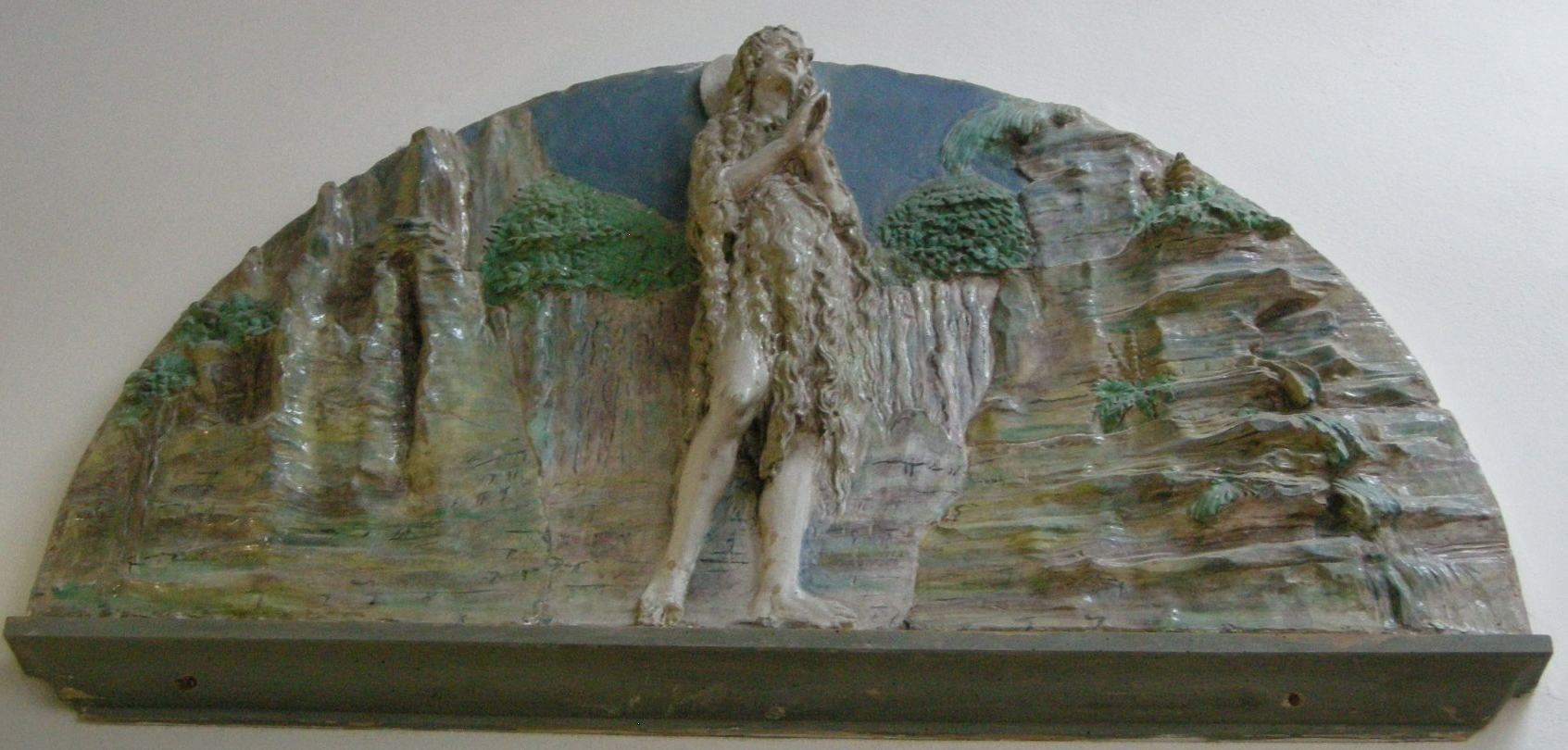

He died in 1521 in Florence, leaving Santi Buglioni heir to his art. He had married Lisabetta Mori on 21 August 1489.

== Selection of his artworks ==
=== Florence ===
- Badia Fiorentina
  - Madonna
- Museo Nazionale del Bargello
  - Mary with Child, 1480-1490 (attributed)
  - Ascension of Christ, ca. 1500–1505 (attributed)
  - Adoration of the Child with Saints Lucy and Andrew, 1500–1505
  - Saint Francis Receiving the Stigmata, 1500–1505
  - Saint Jerome in the Desert, 1500–1505
  - Birth of Christ, 1500–1510
- Museo dell'Opera del Duomo
  - Lunetta with Mary in Egypt
- Church of Ognissanti
  - Lunette with Coronation of the Virgin (attributed)
- Church of San Miniato al Monte
  - Crucifixion
- Church of Santa Lucia dei Magnoli
  - Saint Lucia Adored by the Angels
- Diocesan museum of Santo Stefano al Ponte
  - Two shepherds with flute and basket resp., three angels, ox, donkey and sheep, 1500
- Spedale degli Innocenti
  - Madonna and Saints, 1520

=== Elsewhere in Italy ===
- Antona, Church of San Geminiano
  - Madonna and Child with Four Saints, 1490–1495
- Bolsena, Basilica of Santa Cristina
  - Lunette with Mary and Child between Saints Christine and George, 1494/95
  - Altar of St. Christine, 1495
  - Crucifixion, 1496
  - Fair of Bolsena, 1496
  - Saint Christine, 1496
- Cutigliano, Church of the Madonna di Piazza
  - Madonna and Child between Saints Anthony Abbot and Bernardine of Siena
- Empoli, Church of Santa Maria a Ripa
  - Sant'Anselmo tra i santi Lorenzo, Giuliano, Rosa da Viterbo e Chiara, 1500–1505
- Fabbrica (Peccioli), Church of Santa Maria Assunta
  - Various works
- Fiesole, Duomo
  - San Rocco
- Marliana, Church of San Niccolò
  - Angel with Lantern, 1510
- Monsummano Terme, Museo della città e del territorio
  - Madonna and Child (attributed)
- Perugia, Basilica di San Pietro
  - Three medallions with Saints Peter and Benedict, 1487–1488
  - Monogram of Christ, 1487–88
  - Christ and the Samaritan Woman, 1487–88
- Prato, Church of San Giusto
  - Baptismal Font, 1510
- Prato, Museo civico
  - Madonna and Child, Holy Spirit and Two Cherubs
- Pisa, Camposanto
  - Madonna and Child, 1520
- Pistoia, Museo civico
  - Resurrection of Christ, 1490
- Pistoia, Ospedale del Ceppo
  - Lunette with the Coronation of Mary, 1511
  - Coats of arms, 1515
- Radicofani, Church of San Pietro
  - Crucifixion of Christ with Mary Magdalene, 1490-1495
- Rocca San Casciano, Santa Maria della Lacrime
  - Adoration of the Child with St. Joseph and Angels, 1490–1500
- Rome, Vatican Museums
  - Coat of arms of Pope Innocent VIII, 1484–1492
- San Mauro a Signa, Church of San Mauro
  - Tabernacle with the Presentation in the Temple, ca. 1500–1505
- San Vivaldo (Montaione), Church of San Vivaldo
  - Nativity with Saints Vivaldo and Catherine of Alexandria
- Settimello (Calenzano), Church of Santa Lucia
  - Santa Lucia'

=== Elsewhere in Europe ===
- Amsterdam, Rijksmuseum
  - Madonna and Child, 1490–1500
- Krefeld, Kaiser Wilhelm Museum
  - Bust of the young John the Baptist, 1500
  - Madonna and Child, 1500
- St. Petersburg, Hermitage Museum
  - Nativity of Christ with the Adoration of the Shepherds, 1485–1490

=== USA ===
- Cleveland Museum of Art
  - Madonna Enthroned with Child between Saints Francis and Anthony Abbot, 1510–1520
- Los Angeles County Museum of Art
  - Nativity of Christ, 1520

== See also ==
- Santi Buglioni, nephew and collaborator of Benedetto Buglioni
