= Girolamo della Robbia =

Italian sculptor (1488–1566)

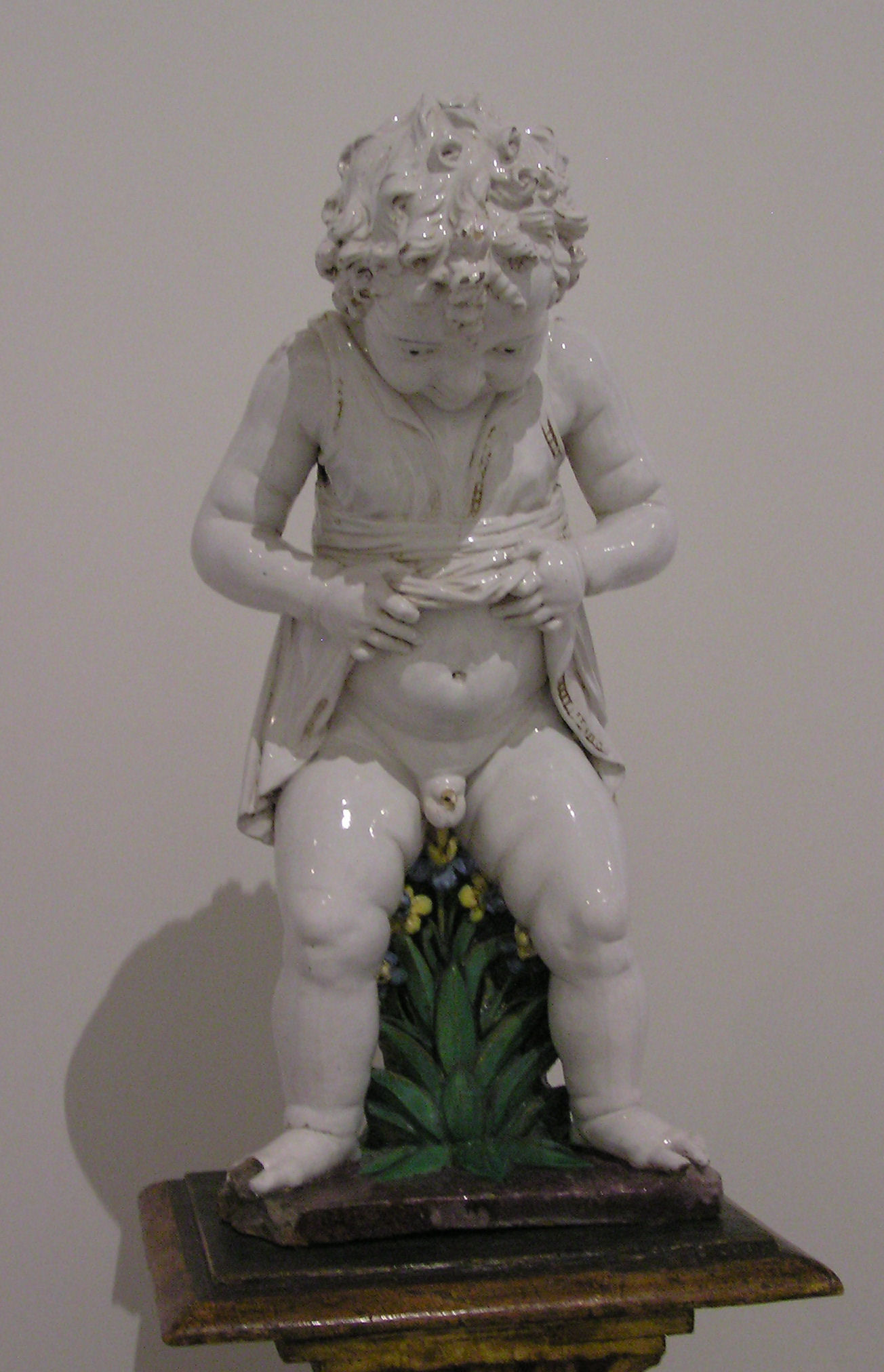
Putto da fontana (1515–20), Berlino, Museo Bode

Girolamo della Robbia (1488 – 4 August 1566) was an Italian Renaissance sculptor, mostly in the family style of glazed terracotta, the youngest son of Andrea della Robbia, together with his brother Giovanni della Robbia were among the most active collaborators in the family workshop.

== Biography ==
Della Robbia was born in Florence. In 1517, he moved to France where he worked in the court of King Francis I of France, and in 1529, he joined his brother Luca "the young". In 1525, he returned to Florence following the imprisonment of Francis I (1525–26) or because of the death of his father, which both happened in the same year.

During his stay in Florence (1525–28) he probably made a monumental Crucifix out of terracotta, which is preserved in the Church of St. Peter Vinculis in San Piero in Bagno (Forlì). Also during these years, another work testifies to the presence and activities of Girolamo della Robbia's workshop, the Altoviti Emblem (1525) of Palazzo Pretorio (Certaldo). Among his most challenging and famous pieces are the Tabernacle of Fonticine in Florence and Madonna and Child with St. John now at the BNCF (Biblioteca Nazionale Centrale Firenze) inspired by Raphael’s Madonna of the Louvre, which was on display during the exhibition that presented the Madonna del cardellino, also by Raphael, restored 2008-2009.

He died in Paris on 4 August 1566.

== See also ==
- Della Robbia family

== Bibliography ==
- L. Fornasari, Liletta Fornasari, Giancarlo Gentilini, I Della Robbia, Skira, 2009.
- AA.VV., I della Robbia e l'arte nuova della scultura invetriata. Catalogo della mostra, Giunti Editore, Firenze 1998
