= Contignano =

- Frazione
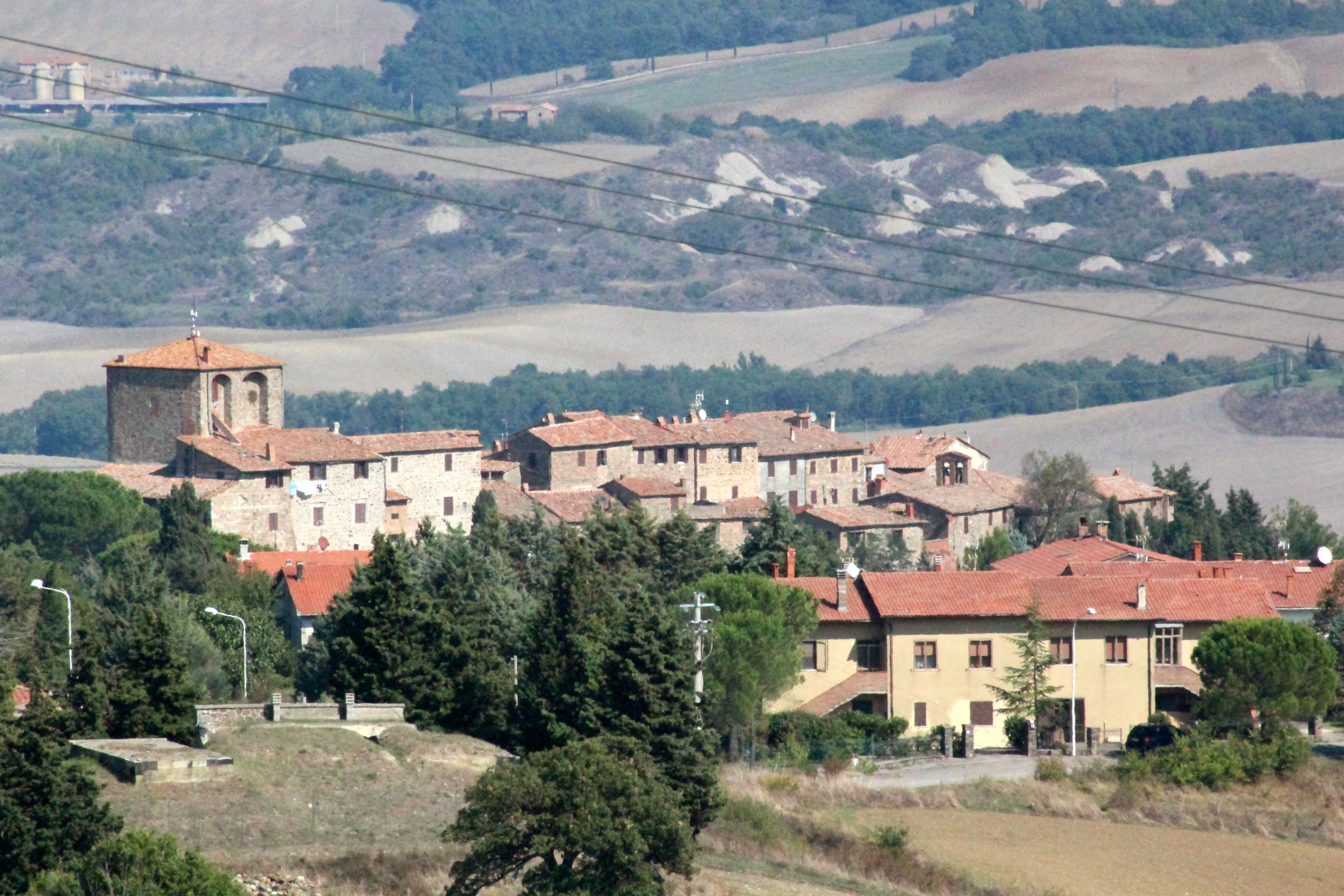
- View of Contignano

- Location of Contignano in Italy
- Coordinates: 42°58′36″N 11°44′32″E
- Country: Italy
- Region: Tuscany
- Province: Siena (SI)
- Comune: Radicofani
- Elevation: 479 m (1,572 ft)

Population (2011)
  - Total: 270
- Demonym: Contignanesi
- Time zone: UTC+1 (CET)
  - Summer (DST): UTC+2 (CEST)

Contignano is a village in Tuscany, central Italy, administratively a frazione of the comune of Radicofani, province of Siena. At the time of the 2001 census its population was 286.

Contignano is about 65 km from Siena and 12 km from Radicofani.
