= Bosco Isabella, Radicofani =

Garden in Tuscany, Italy

Coordinates: 42°53′42″N 11°46′04″E

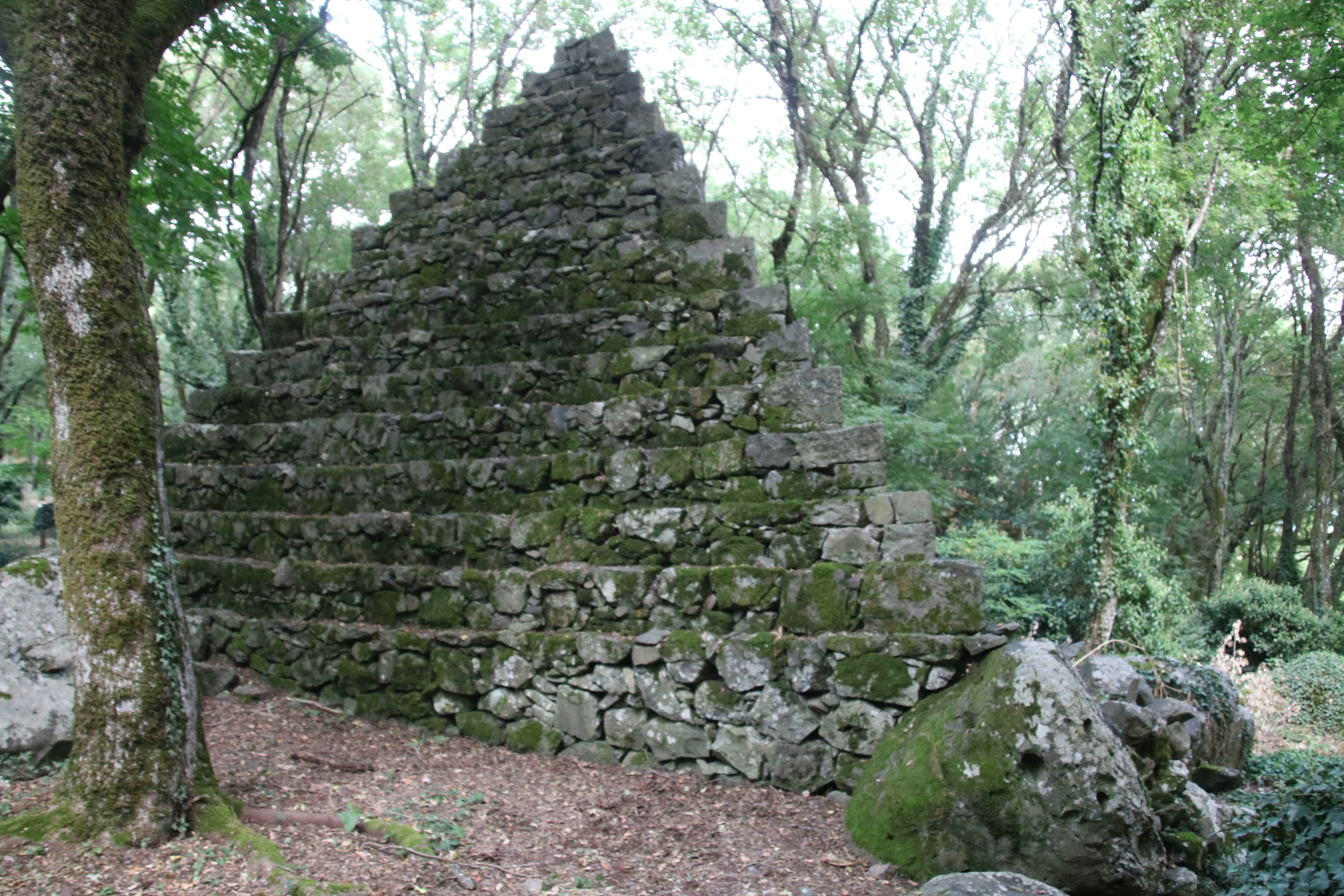
Pyramid of Bosco Isabella

The Bosco Isabella is a self-described "romantic and esoteric garden" that combines a partly natural and cultivated arboretum along with a monumental triangular stone step pyramid. It is located on 2.5 hectares just south of the hamlet of Radicofani in the province of Siena, region of Tuscany, Italy.

This garden, erected in the first half of the 20th century, was the invention of members of the Luchini family, including Odoardo Luchini (1844–1906), an Italian senator; his wife Isabella Andreucci (1842–1924), for whom the garden is named; and their only daughter Matilde (1871–1948), a painter of the Macchiaioli school. Odoardo was passionate about natural English gardens, and arrayed along the paths, various water features, walls and bridges, built with stone from the spot. Ruins of a putative ancient temple were highlighted, as well as the ruins of a former Sienese fort destroyed in 1555, and neighboring the Via Francigena. Some of the designs including the triangle and the circle reference Masonic Order symbols.
