= Giovanni della Robbia =

Italian sculptor (1469–1529)

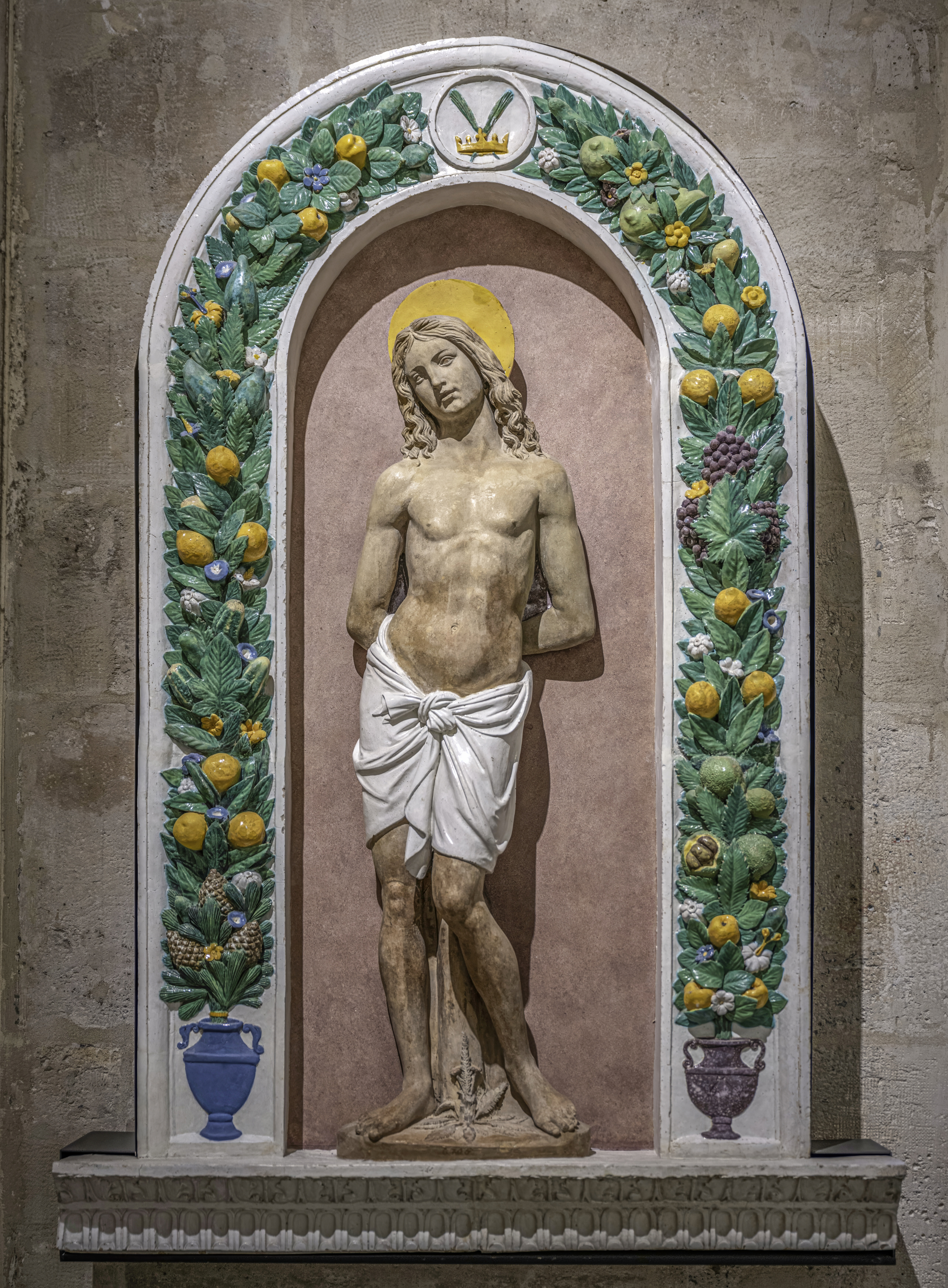
- Giovanni della Robbia, Saint Sebastian, Musée du Louvre, Paris
- Born: Giovanni della Robbia; 1469; Florence, Tuscany, Italy
- Died: 1529; Florence, Tuscany, Italy
- Known for: Sculptures
- Movement: High Renaissance

Giovanni della Robbia (1469–1529) was an Italian Renaissance sculptor, mostly in ceramics.

== Biography ==
Giovanni della Robbia was the son of Andrea della Robbia (1435–1525), brother of Girolamo della Robbia (1488–1566), and grandnephew of Luca della Robbia (1399/1400–1482).

During a great part of his life he worked as assistant to his father and inherited the workshop after his father's death, enhancing the polychrome character of the glazed terracotta works. In many cases the sculpture of the two were difficult to distinguish, and a very large number of pieces of Robbia-ware which were attributed to Andrea, and even to Andrea’s uncle Luca, were really by the hand of Giovanni. Neither Luca nor Andrea was in the habit of signing his work, but Giovanni often did so, usually adding the date, probably because other potters had begun to imitate the Robbia ware. Examples of these imitations are a retable in the Basilica of San Lucchese near Poggibonsi dated 1514, another of the Madonna and Saints at Monte San Savino of 1525, and a third in the Capuchin church of Arceria near Senigallia. Some of them may have been made by assistants trained in the Robbia workshops.

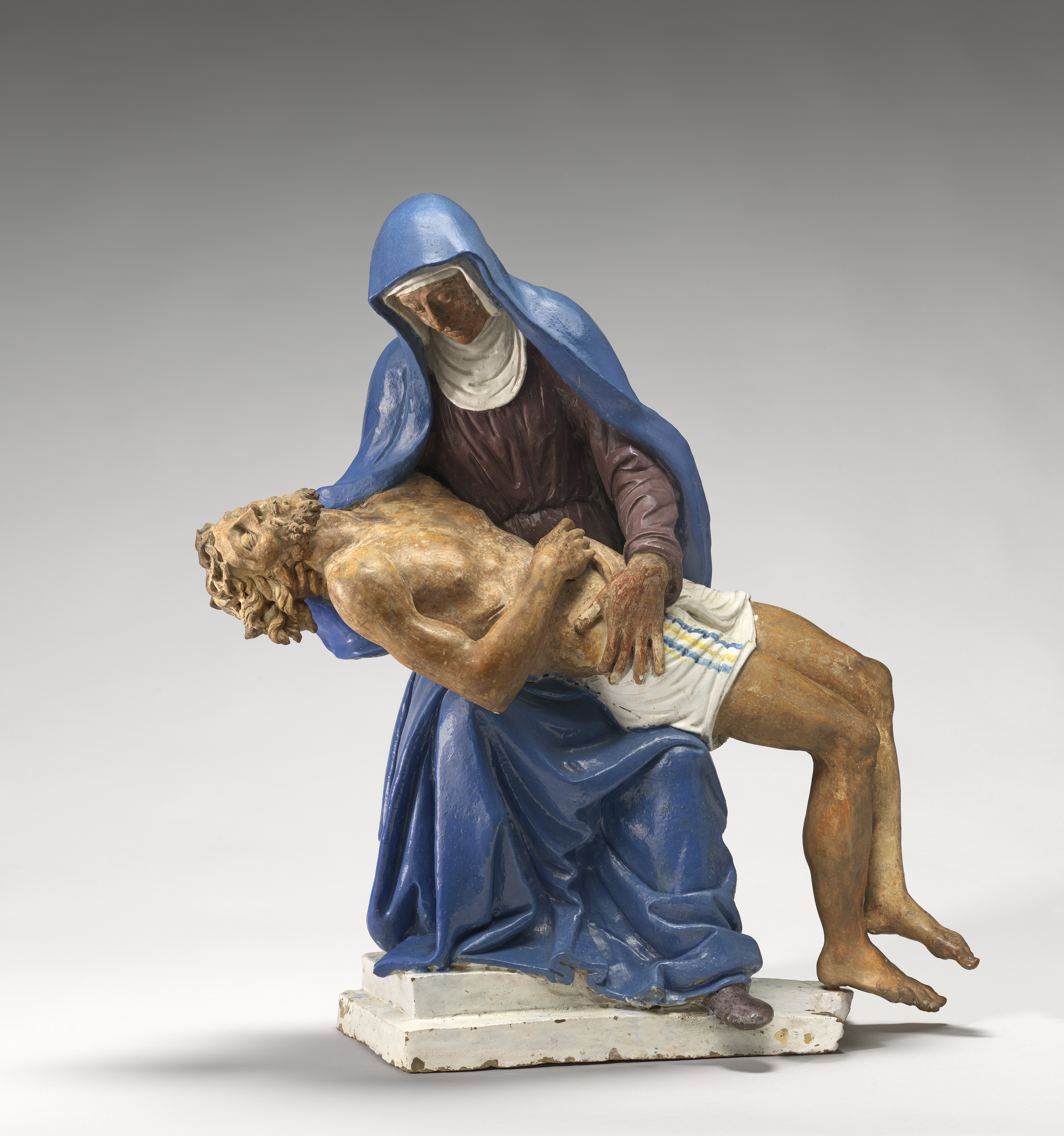
Pietà, c. 1510-1520, National Gallery of Art

One of his finest works is a large retable at Volterra in the church of San Girolamo, dated 1501; it represents the Last Judgment, and is remarkable for the fine modelling of the figures, especially that of the archangel Michael, and a nude kneeling figure of a youth who has just risen from his tomb. Another work that equalled that anything of his father's, from whom the design of the figures was probably taken, is the washings fountain in the sacristy of the Basilica of Santa Maria Novella at Florence, made in 1497. It is a large arched recess with a view of the seashore painted on maiolica tiles at the back. There are also two painted maiolica panels of fruit trees let into the lower part. In the tympanum of the arch is a white relief of the Madonna between two adoring angels. Long coloured garlands of fruit and flowers are held by nude boys reclining on the top of the arch and others standing on the cornice. All this part is of enamelled clay, but the basin of the fountain is of white marble.

Giovanni not only copied the work of Luca and Andrea, but even reproduced in clay the marble sculpture of Antonio del Pollaiuolo, Da Settignano, Verrocchio and others. A relief by him, evidently taken from Mino da Fiesole, exists in the Palazzo Castracane Staccoli. Among the numerous other works of Giovanni are a relief in the wall of a suppressed convent in the Via Nazionale at Florence, and two reliefs in the Bargello dated 1521 and 1522. That dated 1521 is a many-coloured relief of the Nativity, and was taken from the church of San Girolamo in Florence. Its predella has a small relief of the Adoration of the Magi, and is inscribed "Hoc opus fecit Ioaes Andee de Robia, ac a posuit hoc in tempore die ultima lulli ANO. DNI. M.D. XXI." At Pisa in the Campo Santo is a relief in Giovanni's later manner dated 1520; it is a Madonna surrounded by angels, with saints below the whole overcrowded with figures and ornaments.

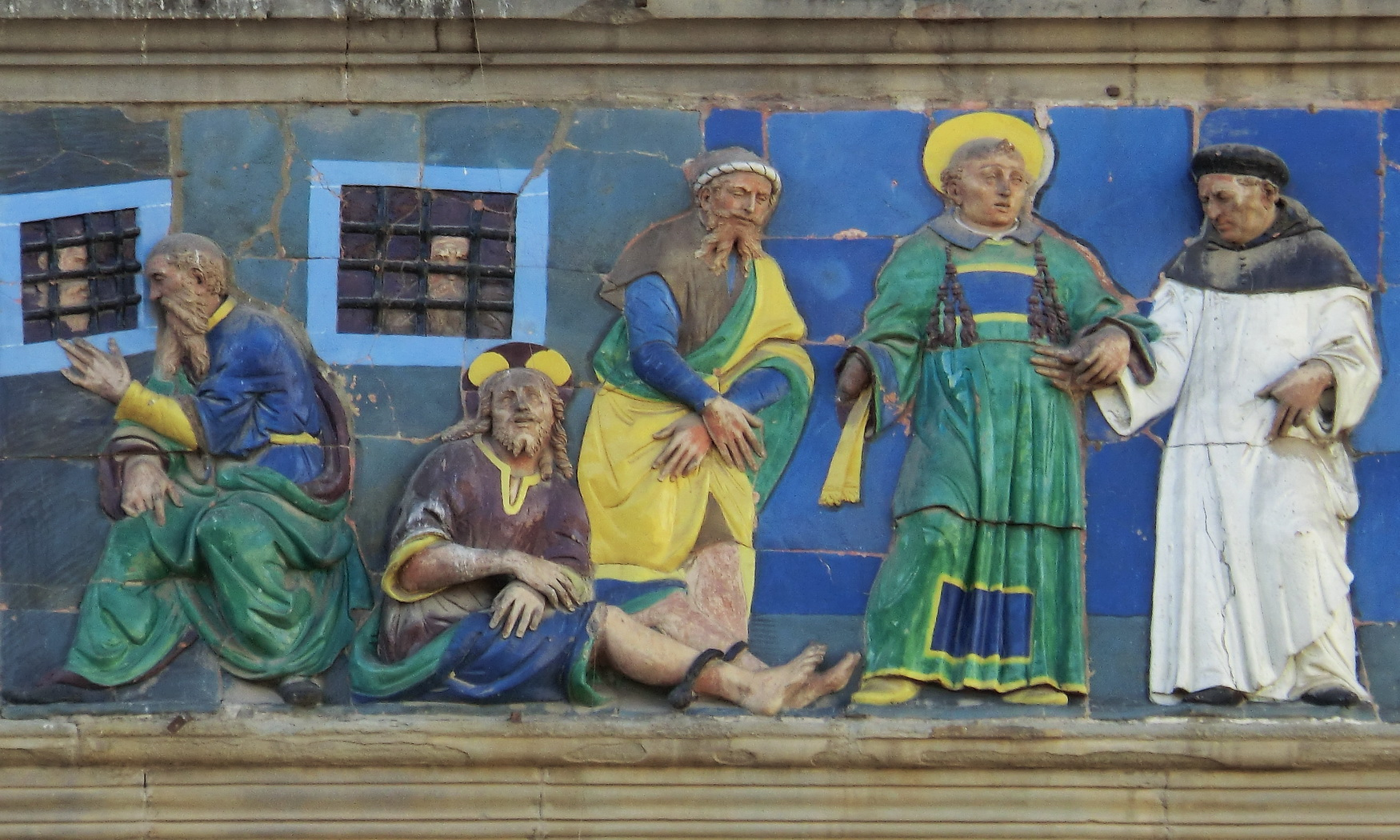
Frieze at Ospedale Del Ceppo, detail

Giovanni's largest and perhaps finest work is the polychromatic frieze on the outside of the Ospedale del Ceppo hospital at Pistoia (itself begun in 1514), for which he received various sums of money between 1525 and 1529, as is recorded in documents which still exist among the archives of the hospital. The subjects of this frieze are the Seven Works of Mercy, forming a continuous band of sculpture in high relief, designed in a very broad sculpturesque way, but with somewhat crude colouring. Six of these reliefs are by Giovanni, namely, Clothing the Naked, Washing the Feet of Pilgrims, Visiting the Sick, Visiting Prisoners, Burying the Dead, and Feeding the Hungry. The seventh, Giving drink to the Thirsty, was made by Filippo Paladini of Pistoia in 1585; this last is simply made of painted stucco. The large figures of the virtues placed between the scenes, and the medallions between the pillars, are the work of assistants or imitators.

A large octagonal font of enamelled clay, with pilasters at the angles and panels between them with scenes from the life of John the Baptist, in the church of San Leonardo at Cerreto Guidi, is a work of the school of Giovanni; the reliefs are pictorial in style and coarse in execution. Giovanni's chief pupil was a man named Benedetto Buglioni (1461–1521), and his nephew Santi Buglioni (b. 1494), entered the Robbia workshops in 1521, and assisted in the later works of Giovanni.
