= Ospedale del Ceppo =

Historical hospital in Pistoia, Italy

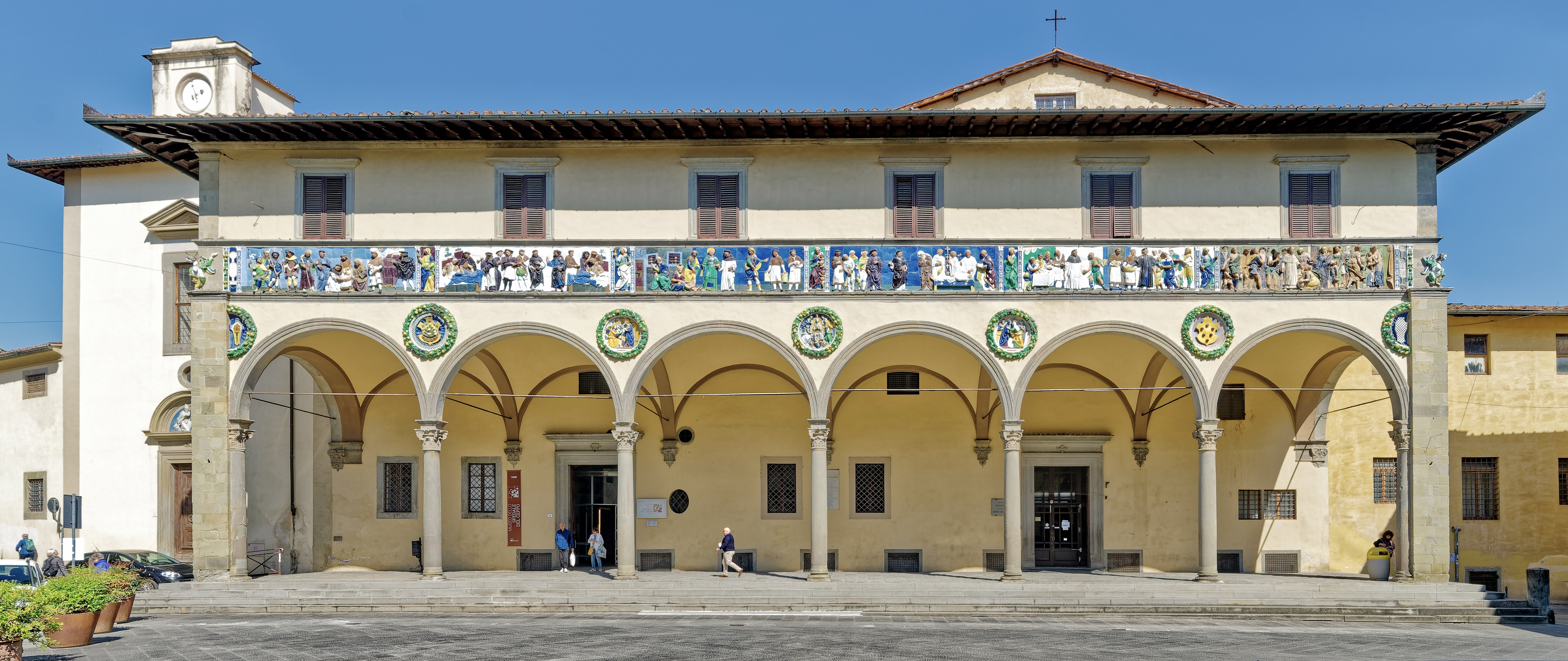

Geography
- Location: Pistoia, Tuscany, Italy
- Coordinates: 43°56′6.05″N 10°55′0.39″E

History
- Opened: 1277

Links
- Lists: Hospitals in Italy

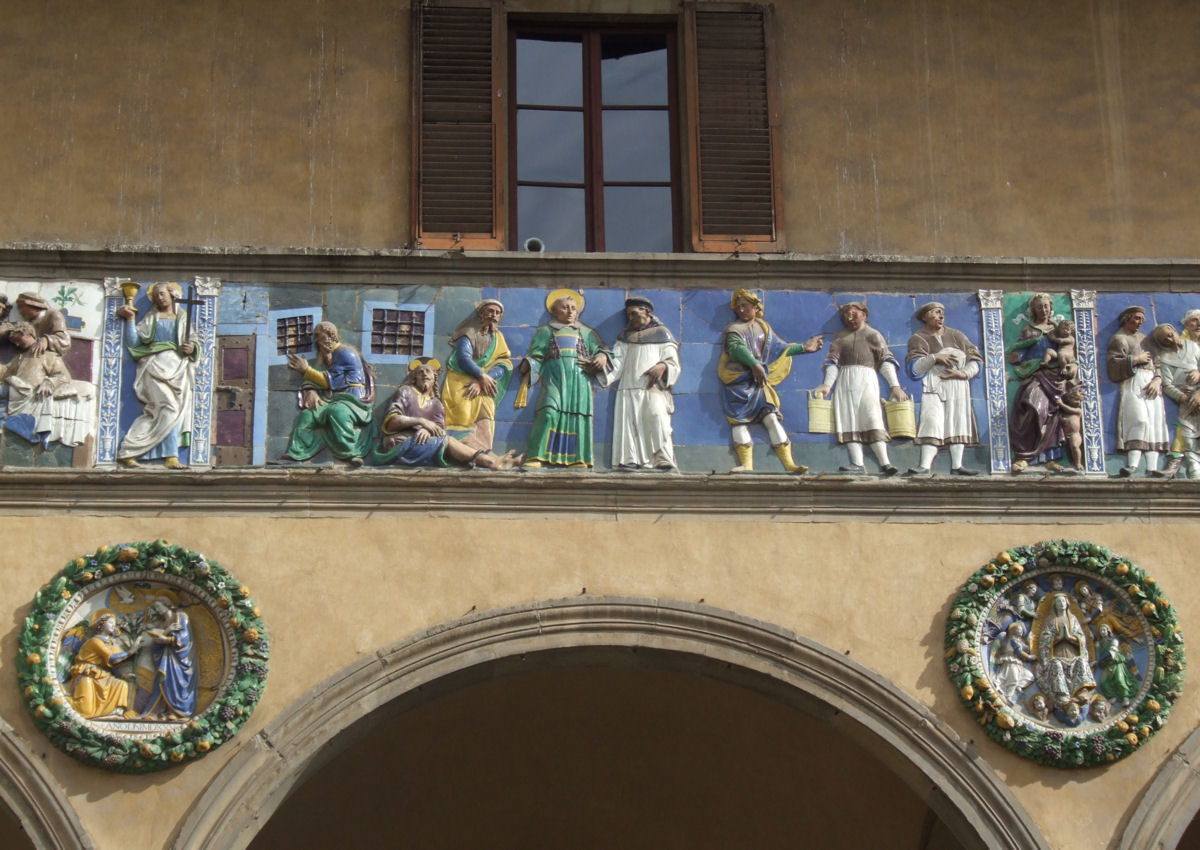
Detail of the frieze and the tondos.

Ospedale del Ceppo is a medieval hospital founded in 1277 in Pistoia, Tuscany, central Italy.

== History ==
According to tradition, the hospital (ospedale) was founded in 1277 by the Sorority of Santa Maria or Compagnia del ceppo dei poveri ("the offering trunk of the poor"). In 1345 ongoing works for a new cloister are documented, including an oratory and a residence for women (domus). It became the city's main hospital after the donations received in the wake of the Black Death of 1348. Initially given to the cathedral chapter, from 1350 the commune of Pistoia tried to absorb direction of the company.

After the conquest of Pistoia by the Republic of Florence in 1401, the Florentines officially confirmed the lay status of the hospital. In 1456 the hospital administrators commissioned the Florentine architect Michelozzo di Bartolomeo a restoration of the building. The election of the spedalingo (rector) was often contended between the noble Pistoiese families, sometimes causing popular turmoil, and in 1494 the Compagnia del Ceppo was expelled from its directoral position, the hospital administrated by the communal priori. In 1501 the hospital was submitted to the Hospital of Santa Maria Nuova in Florence. After becoming cardinal and shortly after died in 1518, Niccolò Pandolfini was followed as spedalingo by the Florentine Leonardo Buonafede. Buonafede ordered the realization of the decorative frieze which is now the main feature of the monumental façade.

In 1784 Grand Duke Pietro Leopoldo of Tuscany aggregated the hospital to a new entity including the other Pistoiese hospital of San Gregorio, the Spedali Riuniti di Pistoia, the spedalingo returning to be a Pistoiese. The corsia di San Leopoldo ("ward of St. Leopold"), now the seat of the Pistoia Medical Academy, was originally dedicated to contagious patients.

== Description ==
The current building complex is the result of a series of additions and restorations of the original 13th-century edifice, which corresponds to today's corsia di Sant'Atto, a large ward with big windows now existing in a 16th-century renovation. In the 15th century the wing and the current façade were added, with the Renaissance loggia built in 1502, inspired by Bruneleschi's Ospedale degli Innocenti in Florence. The loggia is decorated with a glazed terracotta frieze executed by Santi Buglioni between 1525 and 1529: it portrays the seven works of mercy, mixed with scenes of the Virtues. A panel was replaced in 1586 by a new one, not in ceramic glaze. Also from the late 1520s are the tondoes by Giovanni della Robbia and workshop, depicting scenes of the Life of the Virgin, the Annunciation, the Glory of the Virgin, the Visitation, and the Medici coat of arms.

== See also ==
- History of hospitals
- Medieval medicine of Western Europe § Hospital system
