= Santi Buglioni =

Italian sculptor

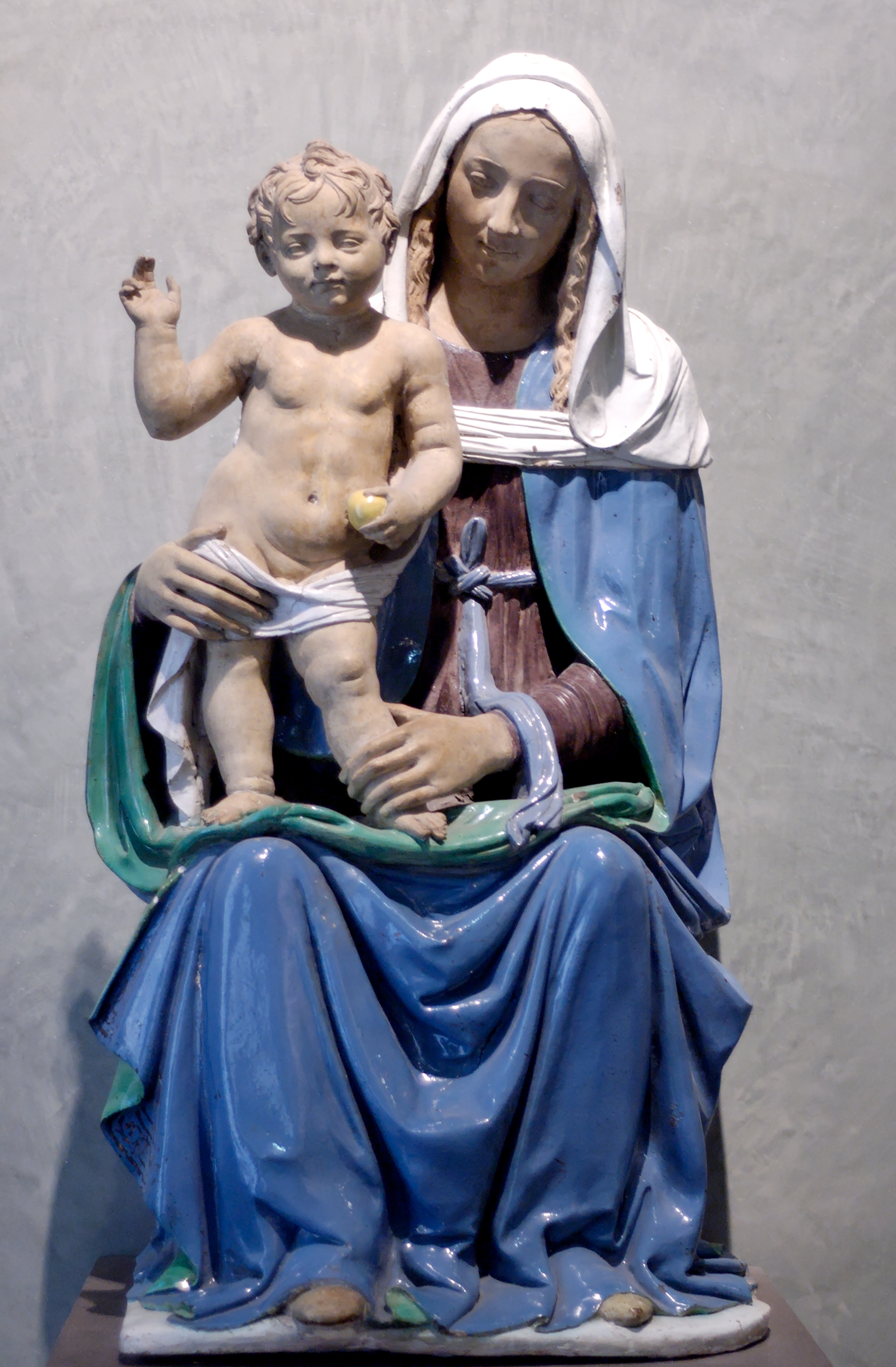
- Santi Buglioni, Madonna with Child, Paris, The Louvre
- Born: Santi di Michele; 1494; Florence Tuscany, Italy
- Died: 1576 (aged 81–82); Florence Tuscany, Italy
- Known for: Sculptures
- Movement: High Renaissance

Santi Buglioni, by the name of Santi di Michele (25 December 1494 – 27 November 1576) was an important Renaissance Italian sculptor, the nephew and collaborator of Benedetto Buglioni.

He was born on December 25, 1494, and his mother Francesca Mori was a near relative of Lisabetta Mori, the wife of Benedetto Buglioni. Hence it was natural that Santi should have become in 1513 a ward and pupil of his distinguished relative.

== The early artworks ==
After Luca della Robbia had moved to France to escape the plague, the Buglioni family inherited from him the secrets of the new pottery glaze techniques. According to Giorgio Vasari, the Buglioni learnt della Robbia's secret through a woman who frequented his house.

In his early works he was the assistant and pupil of Benedetto Buglioni. The monuments at Badia Tedalda reveal him cooperating with Benedetto in the Madonna della Cintola (1521) and as an independent artist in the altarpiece of the Annunciation and Saints (1522). After the death of Benedetto Buglioni the young Santi began a career of more ambitious works.

== The monumental frieze in Pistoia ==
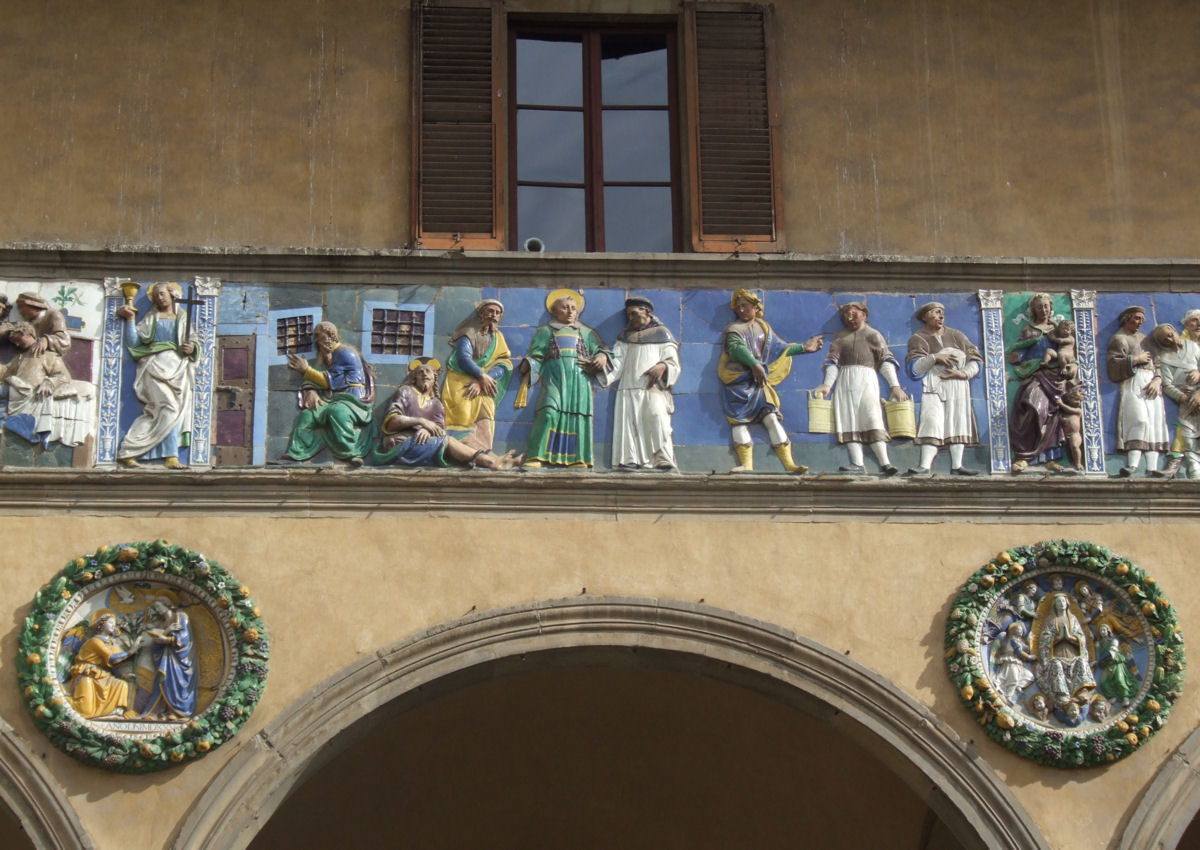
Santi Buglioni, Pistoia, Spedale del Ceppo

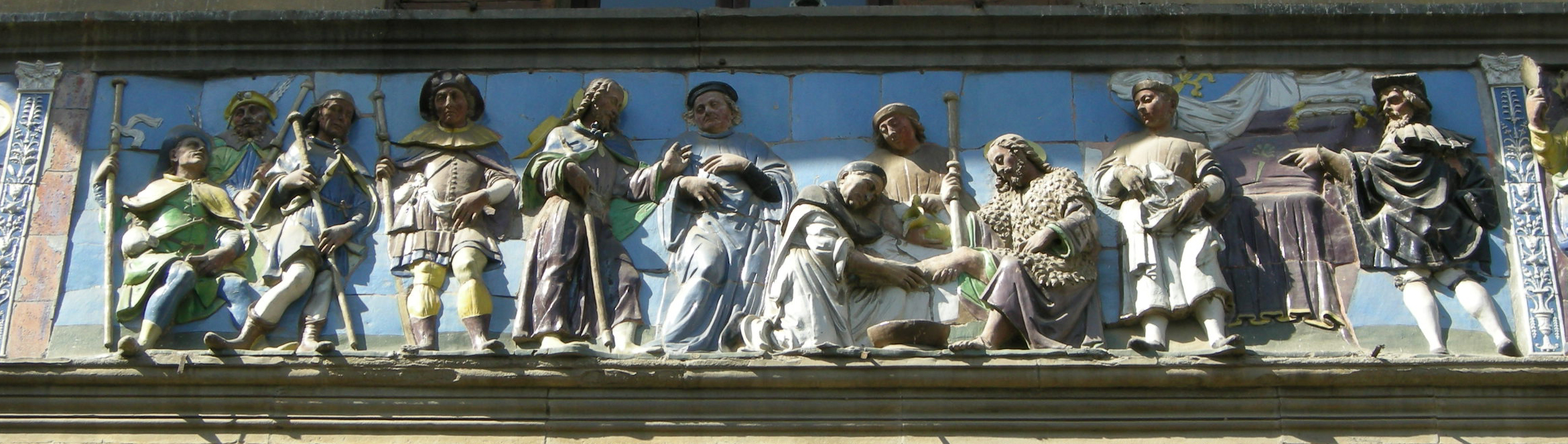
Santi Buglioni, Pistoia, Spedale del Ceppo

Undoubtedly his most remarkable and famous work, which far exceeds in importance all his remaining activity, is the frieze with the Works of Mercy, in glazed and coloured terracotta, on the façade of the Spedale del Ceppo in Pistoia. For centuries, the undertaking was attributed to Giovanni della Robbia; however, it is clear from the payment documents that Santi Buglioni was the main executor. Benedetto had worked for the hospital (1510, 1515), and in 1525 Giovanni della Robbia received an order for medallions and figures, but in 1526–28 the payments refer to Buglioni. Only in 1585 was the frieze completed, probably by Filippo di Lorenzo Paladini, with the scene Dar da bere agli thirstati, in painted stucco.

Undoubtedly there are imperfections, particularly in the arrangement of the figures, and a certain clumsiness of movement. However, Buglioni conducts the modelling of the figures and the faces themselves. And the author looks at details, be they a fur coat or a long beard, with a delicate attention that is indeed rarely found in Giovanni della Robbia's work. Some figures almost suggest in Santi Buglioni an inspiration to Piero di Cosimo, in others he touches on even Filippino Lippi forms, without however that baroque brio and whimsy that give so much languid poetry to Filippino's works.

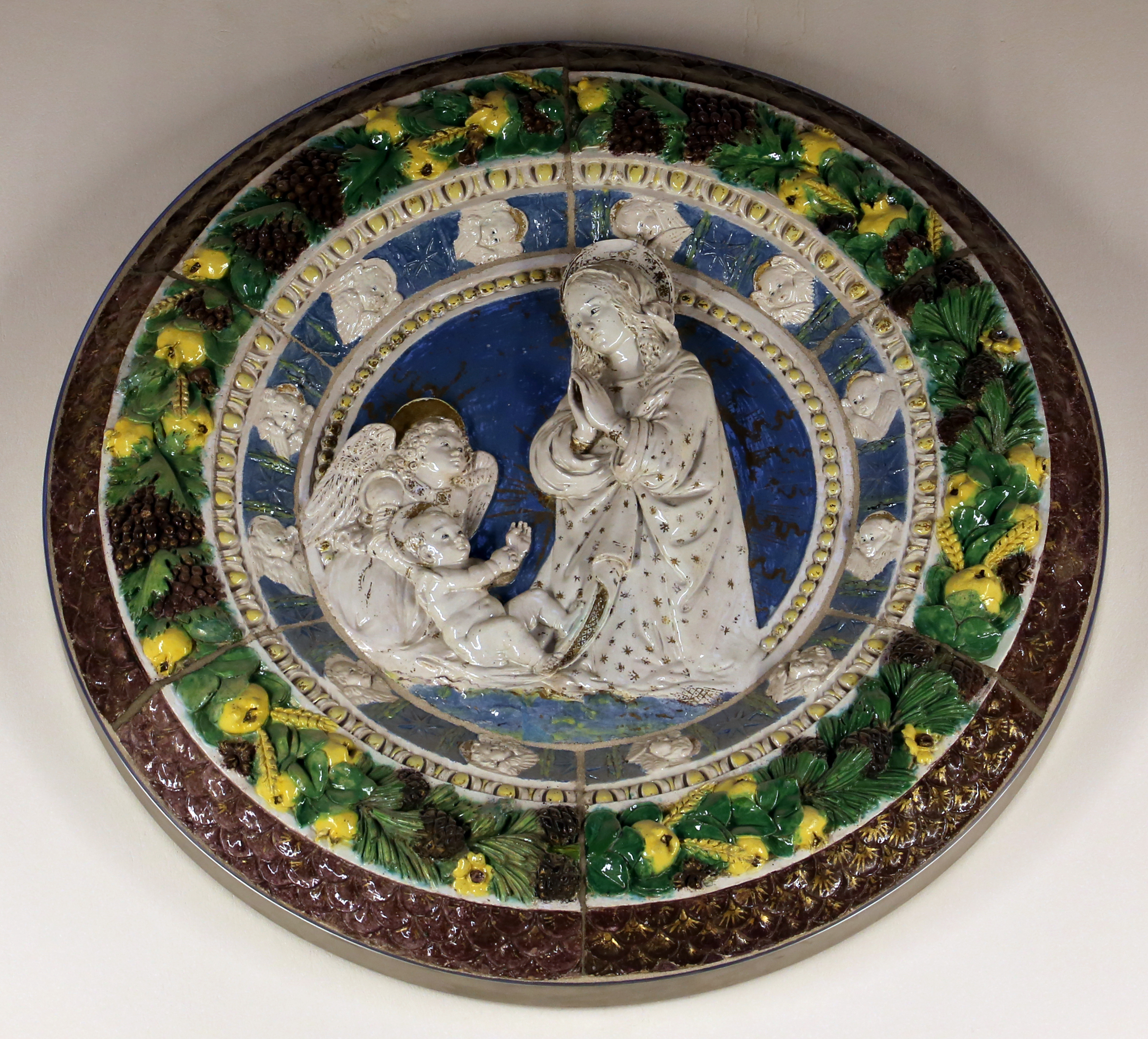
Santi Buglioni, Adoration of the Child, Berlin, Bode-Museum

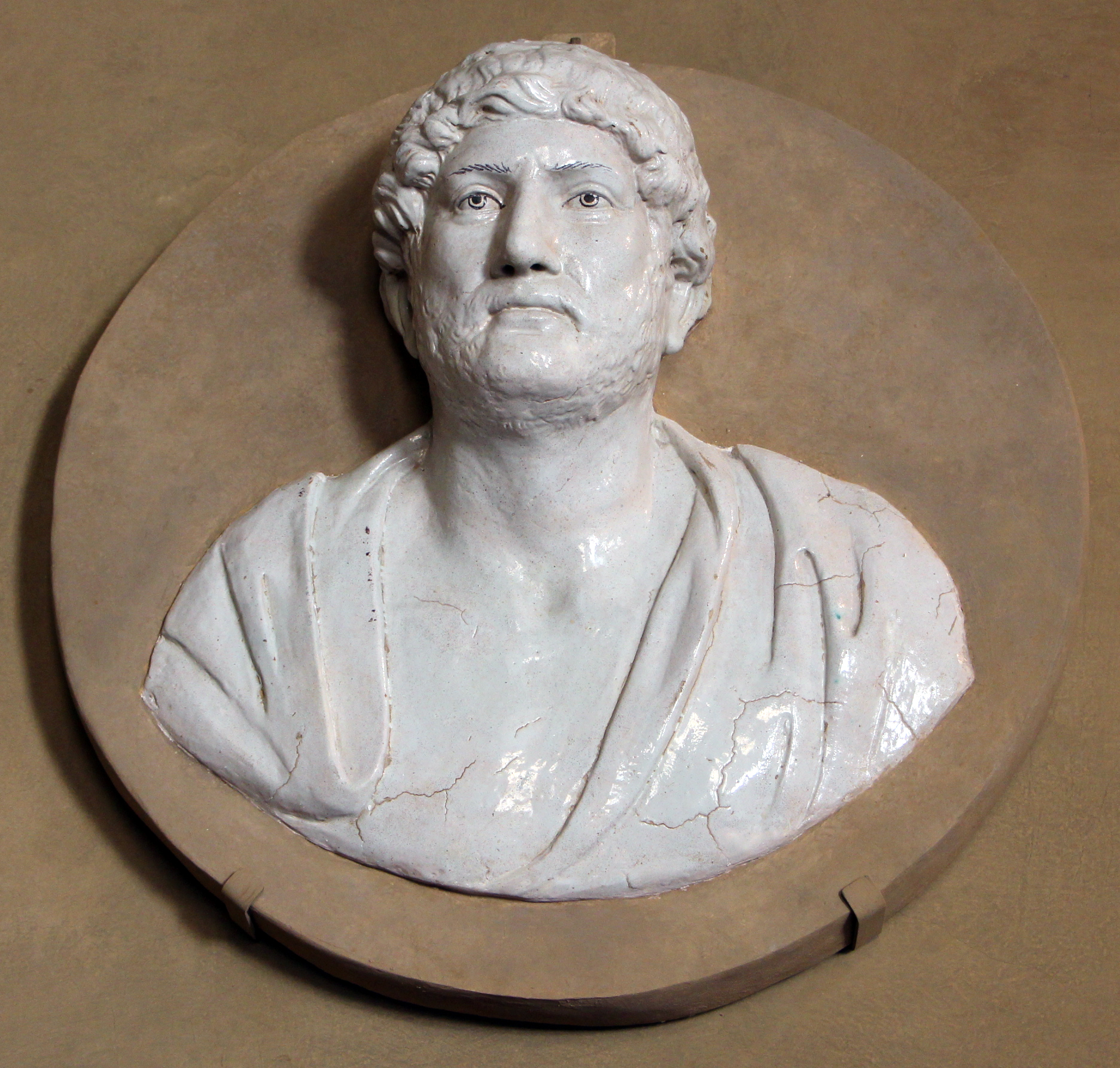
Santi Buglioni, Bust of Adrian, Florence, Museo Davanzati, from the Bargello

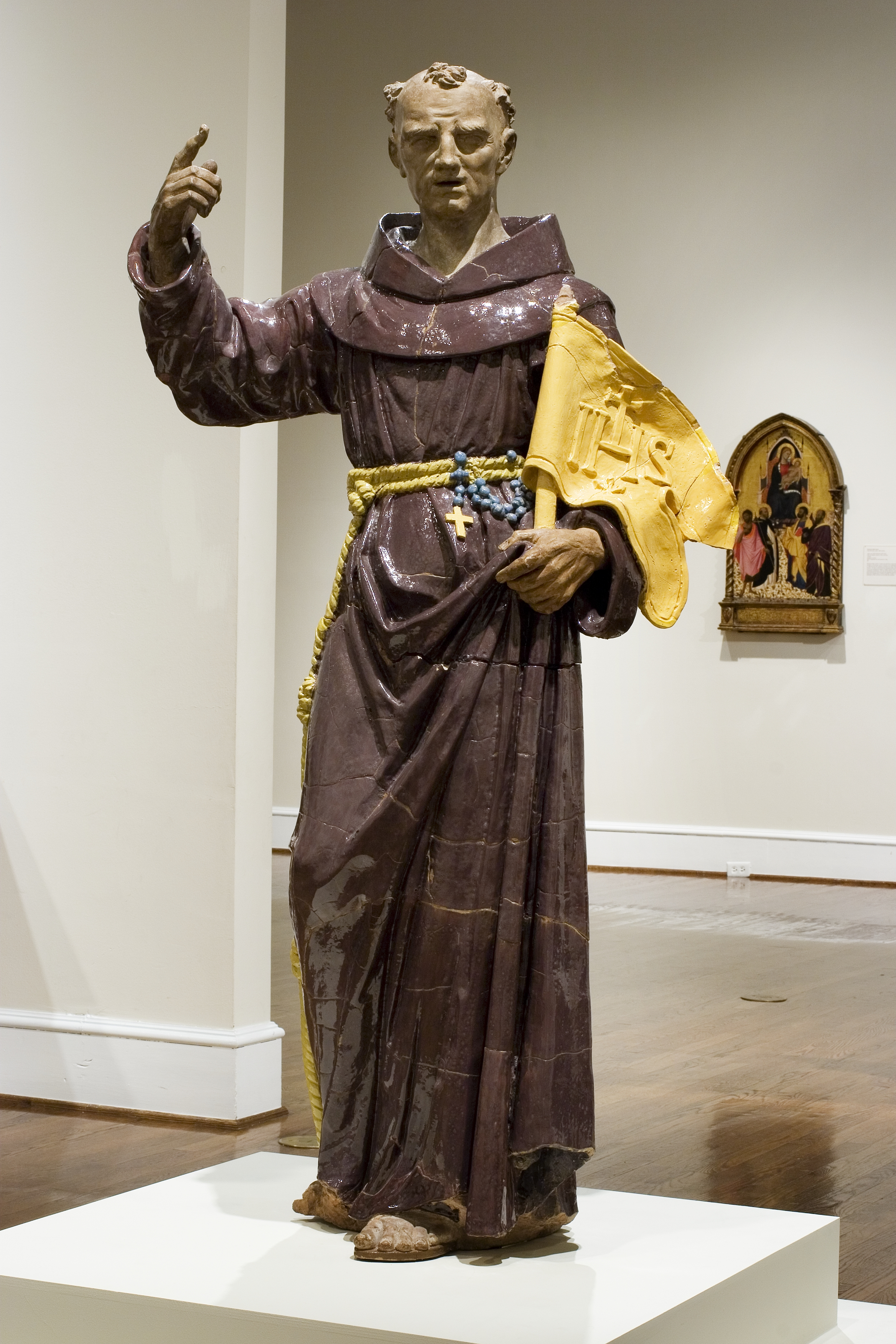
Santi Buglioni, John of Capistrano, Los Angeles County Museum of Art

== Other artworks ==
Works by to Santi Buglioni include the Deposition in the Saint Francis Museum of Greve in Chianti, the cyborium in the church of San Silvestro at Convertoie. Around 1520–1530 he executed the Noli me tangere at the Bargello and the façade decoration of the Ospedale del Ceppo at Pistoia. From 1539 is the monument to the condottiero Giovanni dalle Bande Nere, together with Niccolò Tribolo, followed by a glazed pottery for the Abbey of Vallombrosa.

== Commissions for the Medici in Florence ==
The patronage of the Medici family enhanced the prestige of glazed terracotta, and the medium was also prized by guilds and religious institutions for its beauty, legibility, and durability.

For the celebration of the triumphal wedding of the Grand Duke Cosimo I de' Medici with Eleonora di Toledo, Santi Buglioni assisted Niccolo il Tribolo in constructing a temporary equestrian statue of Cosimo's father, Giovanni delle Bande Nere. This was set up on the Piazza di San Marco and for whose base Bronzino had provided a series of chiaroscuros in the guise of bronze reliefs. The work represented the culmination of the effimere settings created for the occasion, both for the subject, which celebrated the duke's popular father, and for the value aesthetic, later remembered by Giorgio Vasari as the most beautiful artwork created for those wedding celebrations.

In 1542, The Medici Archives record that Ten glazed Heads ordered from Santi di Michele Buglioni by Eleonora di Toledo, wife of the Grand Duke Cosimo I de' Medici, were sent to her father Pedro de Toledo, first Vicerè of Naples, for his Palazzo di Pozzuoli. These were probably busts, or perhaps clypeus, made glazed terracotta, in the style of those already done by della Robbia for the royal villa of Poggioreale in Naples at the end of the 15th century. Staggered between 15 April and 28 September 1542, are three payments to Buglioni and Lorenzo Marignolli, both sculptors in the service of Cosimo dei Medici.

Between 1549 and 1560, under the commission of Cosimo I de' Medici, he created in Florence the glazed terracotta decorations for the most important palaces at the time. Buglioni created the floor of the reading room of the Biblioteca Laurenziana designed by Michelangelo the and for the Pitti Palace Grottoes. In 1560 Santi Buglioni received the payment, designed by Giorgio Vasari, for flat of pope Leo X in Palazzo Vecchio. In 1565, still in Florence, Santi Buglioni executed a series of decorations for the wedding of Francesco de' Medici and Joan of Austria for the Palazzo Vecchio: putti, capricorns, heads.

He also participated in the decorations for Michelangelo's funeral with a portrait of the artist

Between 1549 and 1560, under the commission of Cosimo I de' Medici, he created in Florence the glazed terracotta pavements for the most important palaces at the thime: the Biblioteca Laurenziana, for various rooms in the Palazzo Vecchio and for the Pitti Palace Grottoes.

Santi Buglioni was the artist responsible for the execution of a Medici-Toledo coat of arms in terracotta for the inner guest quarters of the La Verna Convent.

== Last years ==
Buglioni, who had become blind in his late years, died in 1576 and was buried in the church of Santa Maria Maggiore in Florence. His wife Francesca di Dionigi di Simone, nine years younger, was his companion for nearly forty years. She died in 1566. His great-grandson was Vincenzo Viviani, a celebrated mathematician, pupil and biographer of Galileo Galilei.

== Bibliography ==
- G. Vasari, Le Vite de' Più Eccellenti Pittori Scultori et Architettori, edited by G. Milanesi, III, Firenze 1878, p. 376
- A. Marquand, Benedetto and Santi Buglioni, Princeton, 1921
- N. Tarchiani, Santi Buglioni e le botteghe rivali dei della Robbia, in Faenza, XXII, 1934, pp. 135ss
- G. Gentilini, I Della Robbia, La Scultura inventariata nel Rinascimento, Milano, 1992, vol. 2
- G. Gentilini, I Della Robbia e l'arte nuova della scultura invetriata, exh. cat. Fiesole, 1998, pp. 349–351
- J. Gaborit, M. Bormand, Les Della Robbia. Sculptures en terre cuite de la Renaissance Italienne, Paris, 2002, cat. V3, pp. 112–113
- P. Sénéchal, Nouveaux documents sur Luca Della Robbia le Jeune, Giovanni Della Robbia et Santi Buglioni, in La sculpture en Occident, 2007
- D. Dow, Evidence for Buglioni's authorship of the glazed terra-cotta tympanum at the Chiostro dello Scalzo, Florence, in The History of Art, vol. 29, no. 2, 2010, pp. 15–20
- M. Cambareri, Della Robbia, Sculpting with color in Renaissance Florence, exh. cat. Boston, 2016, pp. 17–20
