= Andrea della Robbia =

Italian sculptor

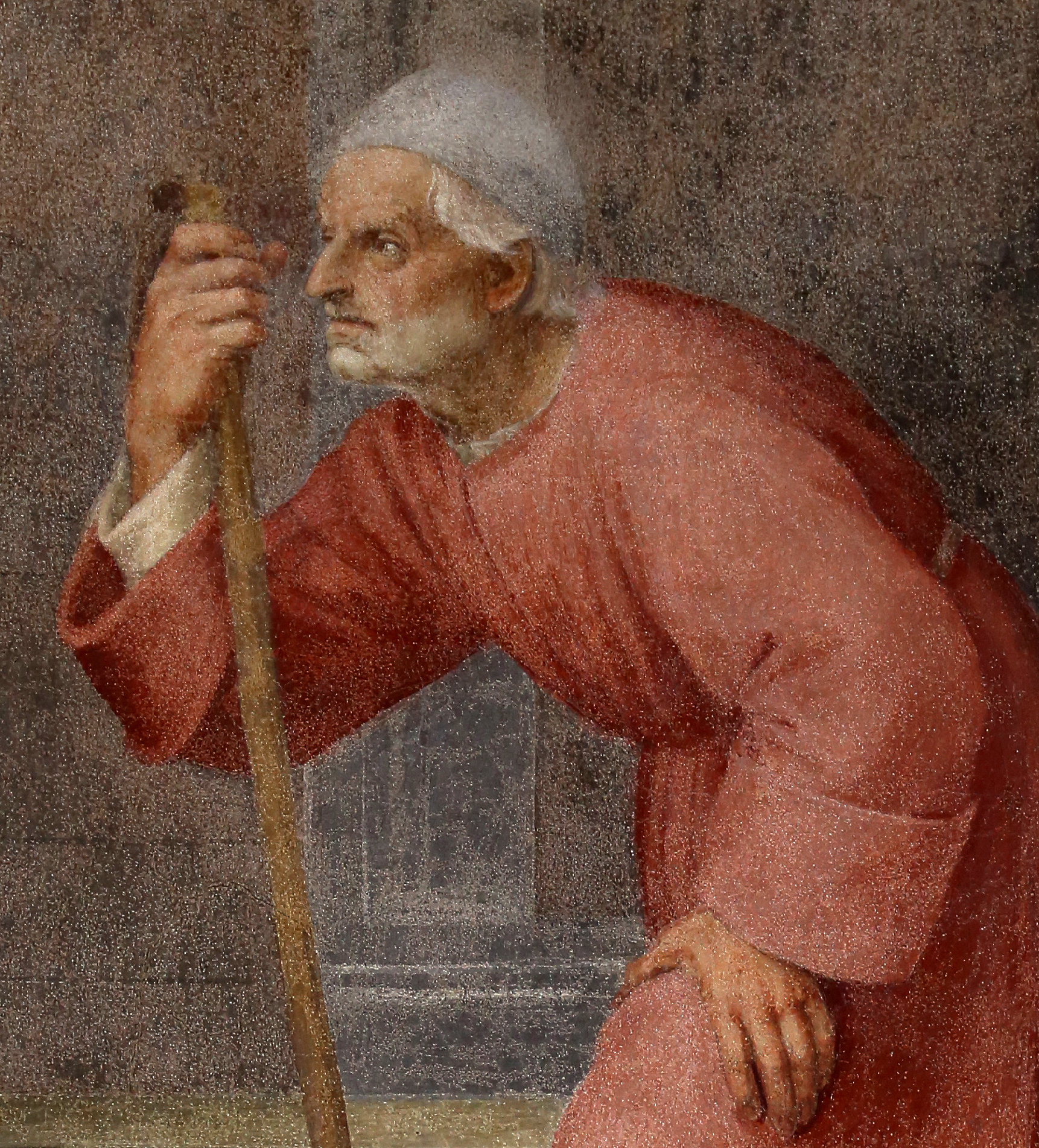
Andrea della Robbia by Andrea del Sarto

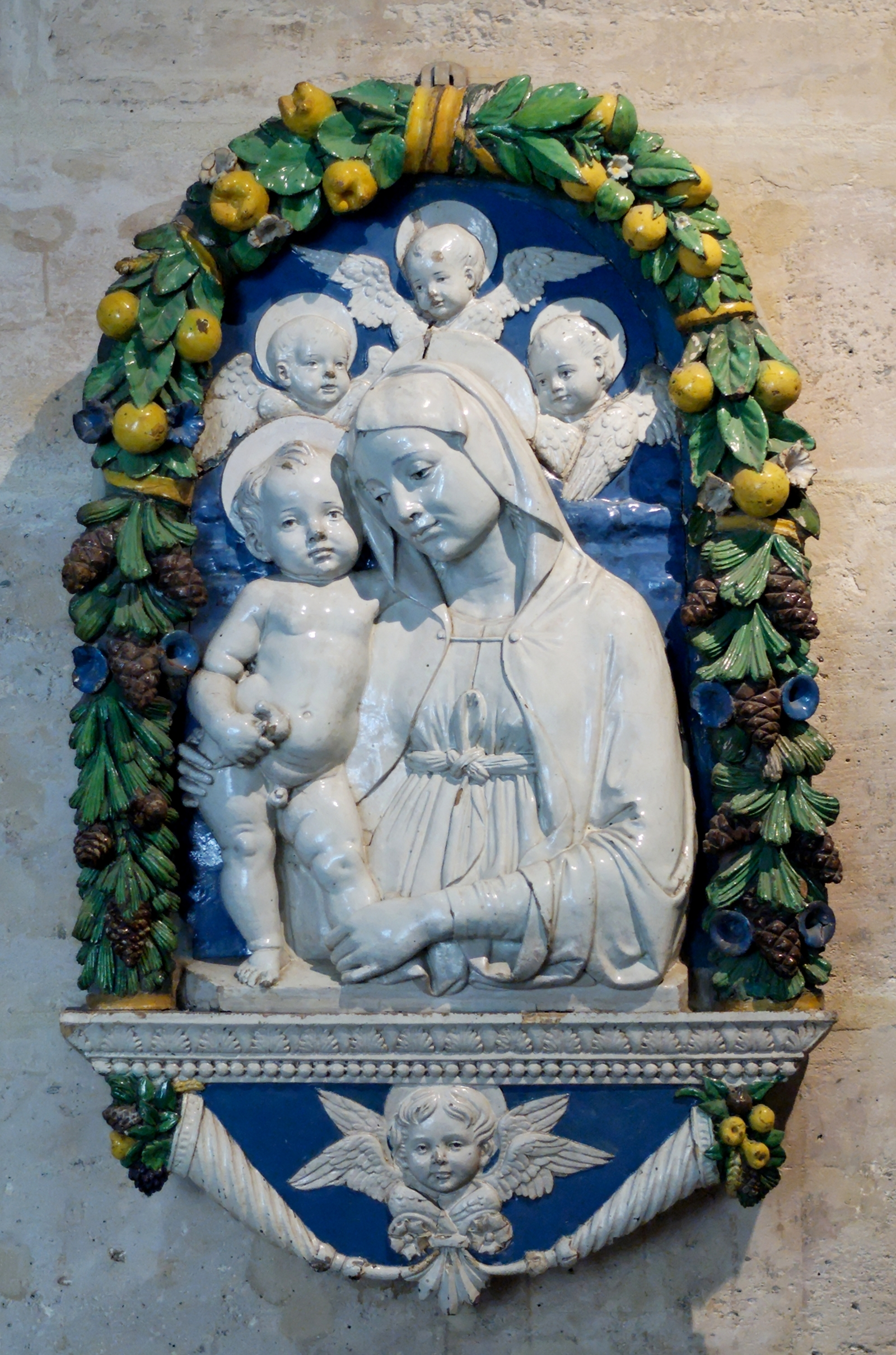
Madonna with Child and Angels (Louvre Museum).

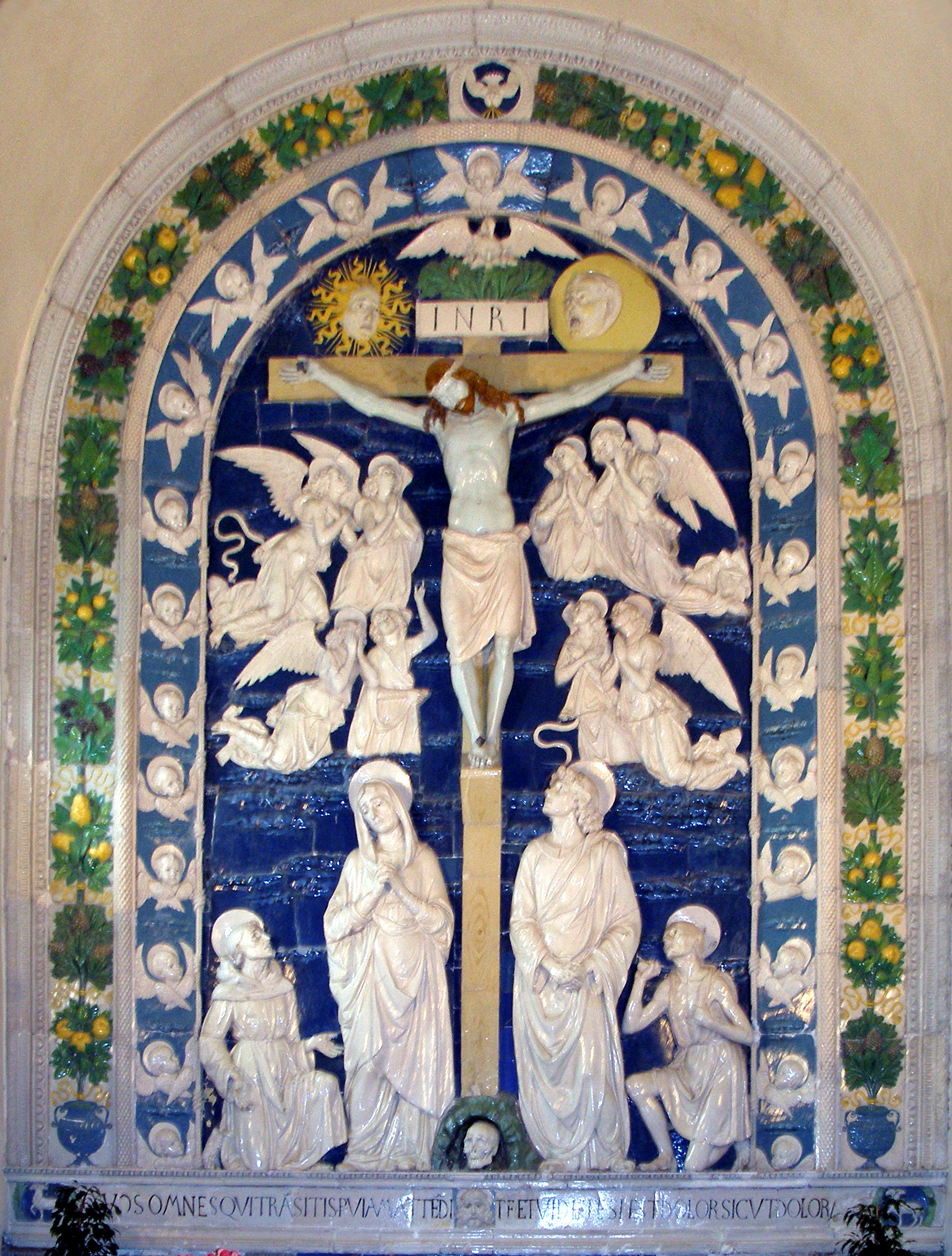
Crucifixion, Sanctuary of La Verna.

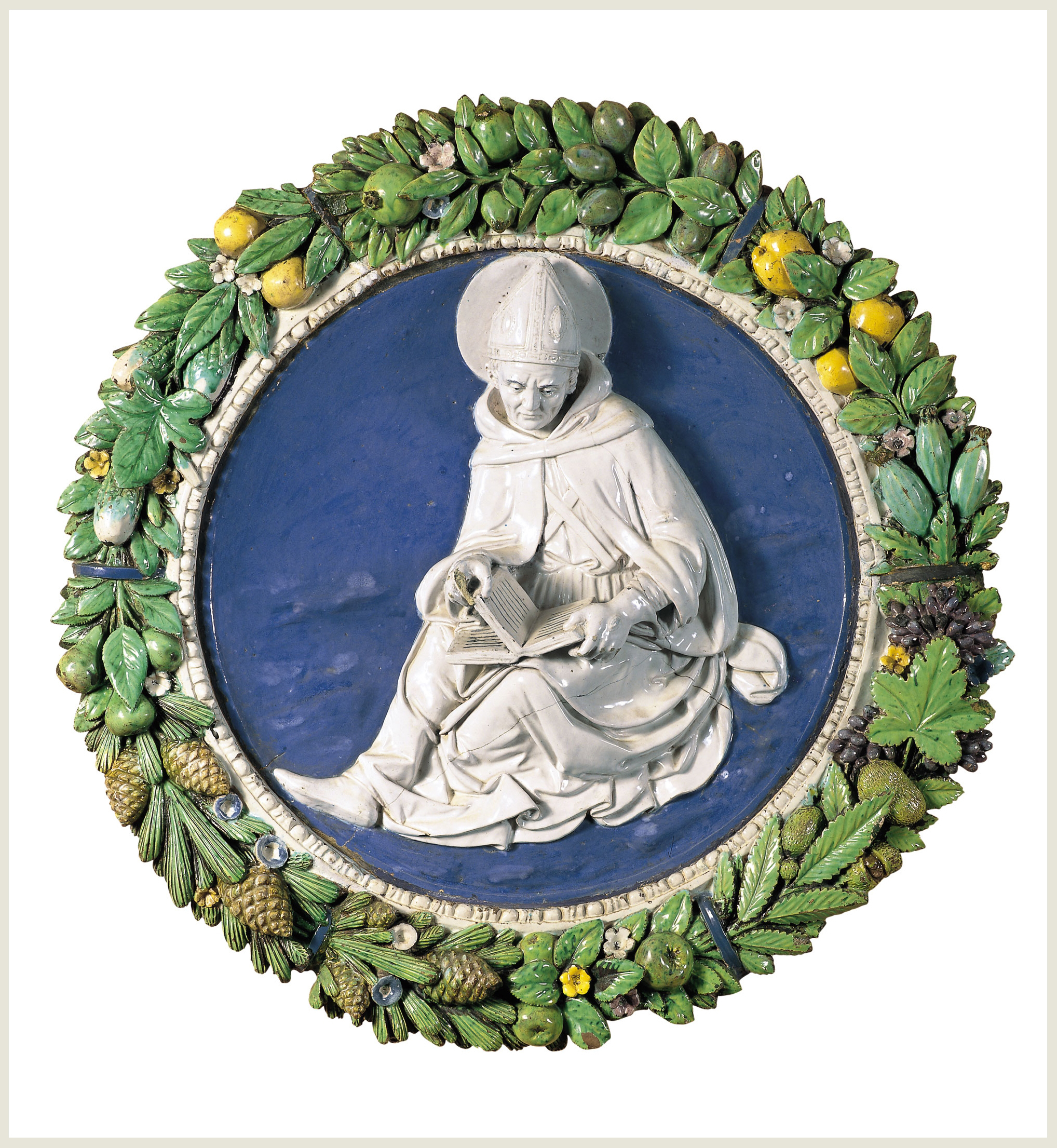
San Agustin (ca 1490), on display at the Carmen Thyssen Museum (Colección Carmen Thyssen-Bornemisza)

Andrea della Robbia (20 October 1435 – 4 August 1525) was an Italian Renaissance sculptor, especially in ceramics.

== Biography ==
Born in Florence, Robbia was the son of Marco della Robbia, whose brother, Luca della Robbia, popularized the use of glazed terra-cotta for sculpture. Andrea became Luca's pupil, and was the most important artist of ceramic glaze of the times.

He carried on the production of the enamelled reliefs on a much larger scale than his uncle had ever done; he also extended its application to various architectural uses, such as friezes and to the making of lavabos, fountains and large retables. One variety of method was introduced in his enamelled work. Sometimes he omitted the enamel on the face and hands of his figures, especially in those cases where he had treated the heads in a realistic manner; as, for example, in the tympanum relief of the meeting of St Domenic and St Francis in the loggia of the Florentine hospital of San Paolo, a design suggested by a fresco of Fra Angelico's in the cloister of St Mark's.

One of the most remarkable works by Andrea is the series of reliefs with babies wrapped in sleeves in white on blue ground set in the already existing tondos on the front of the foundling hospital in Florence. These child-figures from atound 1490 are modelled with skill and variety, no two being alike. Andrea also produced, for guilds and private persons, a large number of reliefs of the Madonna and Child varied with much invention. These are frequently framed with realistic yet decorative garlands of fruit and flowers painted with coloured enamels, while the main relief is left white. The hospital of San Paolo, near Santa Maria Novella, has also a number of fine medallions with reliefs of saints, two of Christ Healing the Sick, and two fine portraits, under which are white plaques inscribed "DALL ANNO 1451 ALL ANNO 1495". The first of these dates is the year when the hospital was rebuilt owing to a papal brief sent to the archbishop of Florence.

Arezzo possesses a number of enamelled works by Andrea and his sons: a retable in the cathedral with God holding the Crucified Christ, surrounded by angels, and below, kneeling figures of San Donato and San Bernardino; also in the chapel of the Campo Santo is a relief of the Madonna and Child with four saints at the sides. In Santa Maria in Grado is a noble retable with angels holding a crown over a standing figure of the Madonna; a number of small figures of worshippers take refuge in the folds of the Virgin's mantle, a favourite motive for sculpture dedicated by guilds or other corporate bodies. Perhaps the finest collection of works of this class is at La Verna, not far from Arezzo. The best of these, three large retables with representations of the Annunciation, the Crucifixion, and the Madonna giving her Girdle to St Thomas, are probably the work of Andrea himself, the others being by his sons.

In 1489 Andrea made a relief of the Virgin and two Angels, now over the archive-room door in the Florentine Opera del Duomo; for this he was paid twenty gold florins. In the same year he modelled the tympanum relief over a door of Prato cathedral, with a half length figure of the Madonna between St Stephen and St Lawrence, surrounded by a frame of angels' heads. In 1491 he was still working at Prato, where many of his best reliefs still exist. A bust of San Lino exists over the side door of Volterra Cathedral, which is attributed to Andrea. Other late works of known date are a magnificent bust of the Protonotary Almadiano, made in 1510 for the church of San Giovanni de' Fiorentini at Viterbo, and a medallion of the Virgin in Glory, surrounded by angels, made in 1505 for Pistoia cathedral. The latest work attributed to Andrea, though apparently only a workshop production of 1515, is a relief representing the Adoration of the Magi, made for a little church, St Maria, in Pian di Mugnone, near Florence.

His workshop was carried on by his son Giovanni della Robbia after his death.

== Works ==
His works included:

- The medallions of infants for the Foundling hospital, Florence, and the Annunciation over the inner entrance
- The Meeting of S. Francis and S. Dominic in the loggia of S. Paolo, Florence
- The medallions at the hospital of San Paolo, near Santa Maria Novella
- The Virgin adoring the Divine Child in the Crib in the Bargello
- The Resurrection of Christ in the S. Bernardino Basilica in L'Aquila
- The Madonna della Quercia at Viterbo
- Coronation of the Virgin, Altarpiece at La Spezia, Santa Maria Assunta
- The marble high altar of S. Maria delle Grazie at Arezzo
- The high altar an Santa Maria in Grado
- The decorations of the vaulted ceiling and porch of the old Pistoia Cathedral
- The tympanum at Prato cathedral
- The decorations of Sante Flora e Lucilla in Santa Fiora
- The Crucifixion of Christ and the Assumption of the Virgin at La Verna.
