= Peter Vischer =

Peter Vischer may refer to:

- Peter Vischer the Elder (died 1529), German sculptor
- Peter Vischer the Younger (1487–1528), German sculptor
- Peter Vischer (1751–1823), Swiss art collector
- Peter Vischer-Passavant (1779–1851), Swiss art collector

== See also ==
- Vischer family of Nuremberg
