= Peter Flötner =

German designer, sculptor, and printmaker

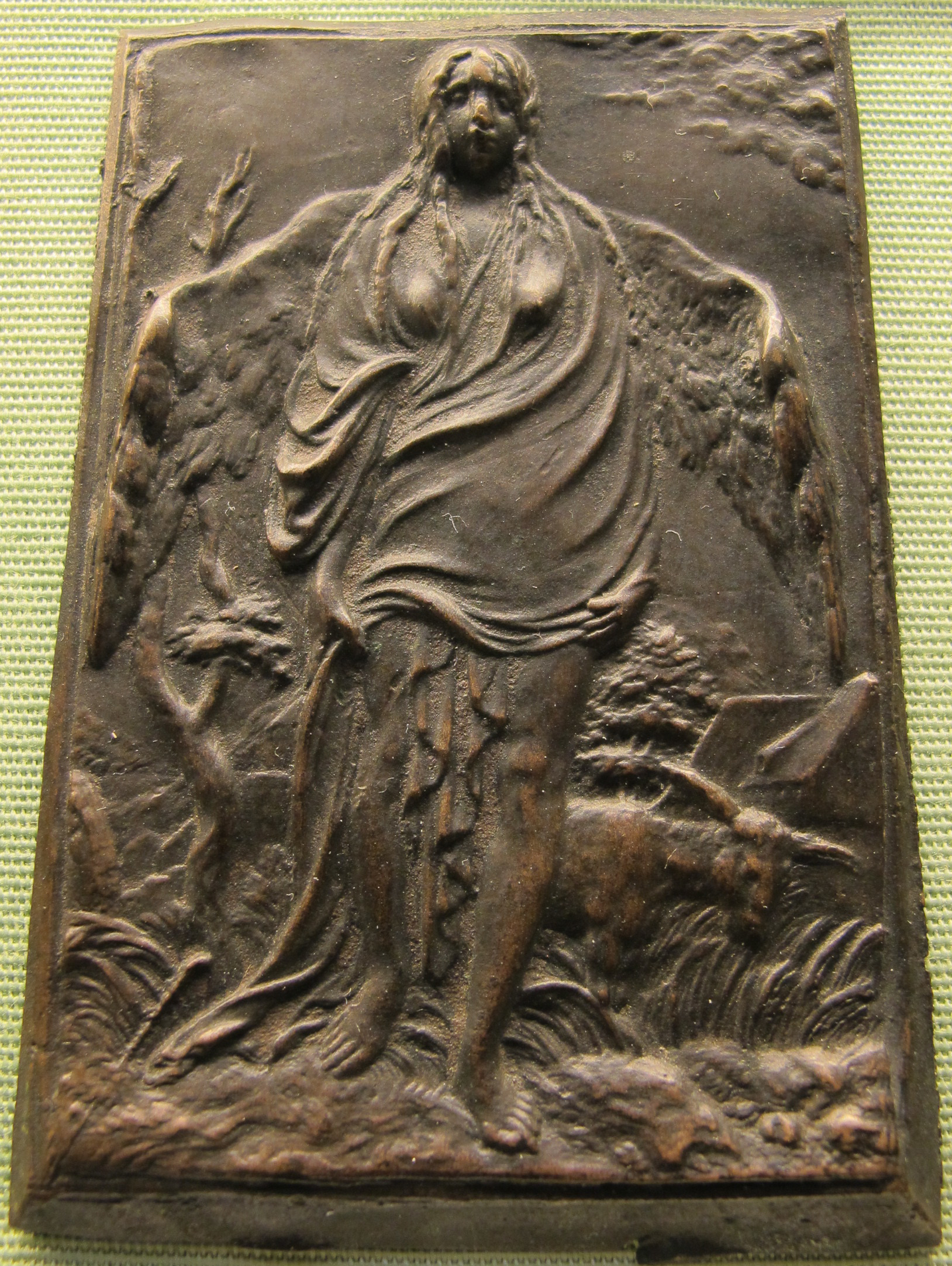
"Accidia" (Sloth), plaquette from a set of the Seven Deadly Sins, c. 1540

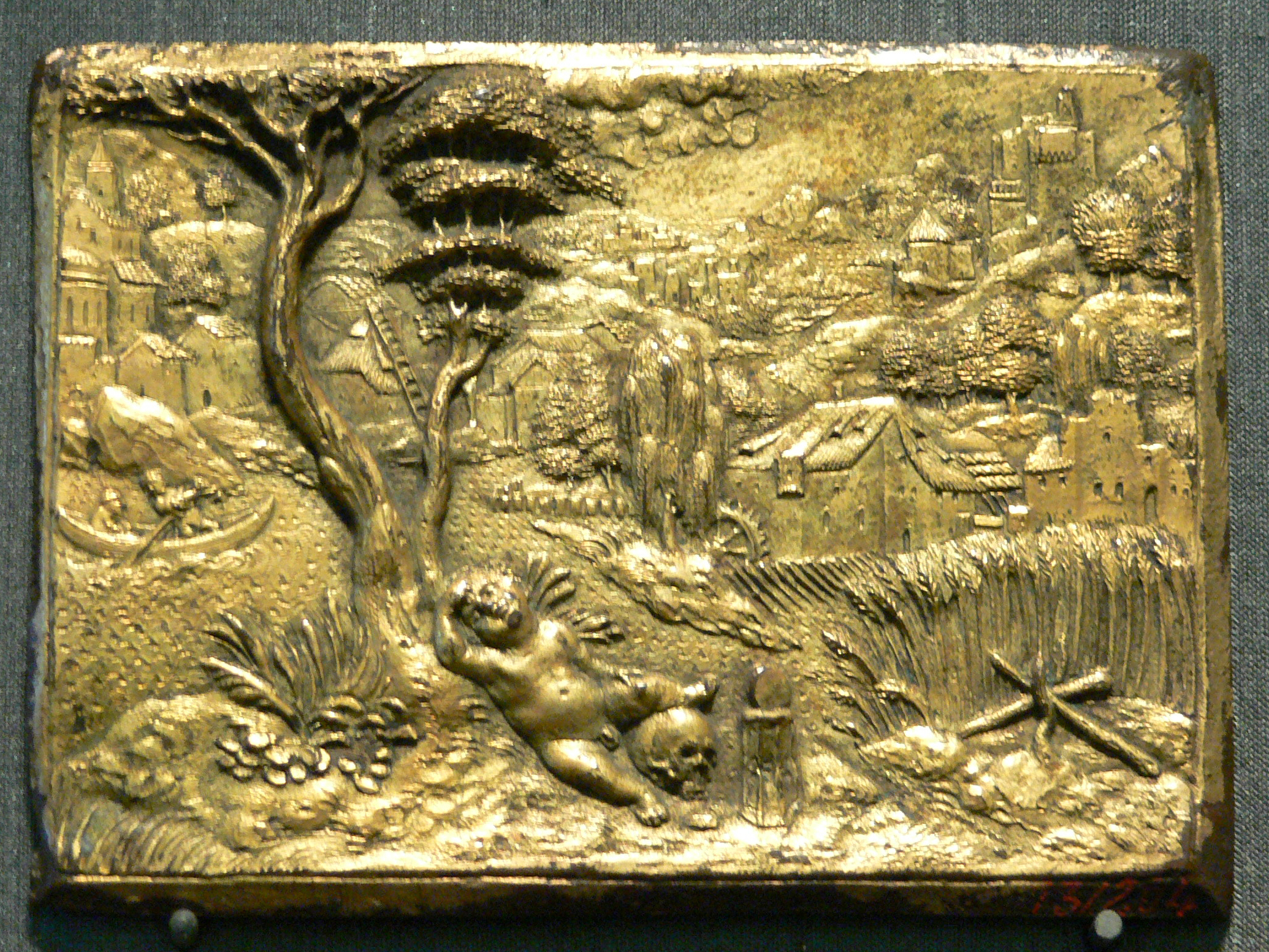
Peter Flötner: Vanitas, 1535–1540, gilt bronze plaquette, Bavarian National Museum, Munich

Peter Flötner, also Flatner, Flettner, or Floetner (c. 1490 in Thurgau – 23 October 1546, in Nuremberg), was a German designer, sculptor, and printmaker. He was a leading figure in the introduction of Italianate Renaissance design to sculpture and the decorative arts in Germany, competing in this regard with the Vischer Family of Nuremberg. He designed and produced work in a wide range of media, but "seems to have made only a modest living", unlike many of his contemporary artists.

== Life and work ==
Flötner probably trained as a goldsmith in Augsburg with Adolf Daucher. Under his master's guidance he contributed to the goldwork in the Fugger Chapel . After an interlude in Italy, he became a master craftsman in Ansbach. He moved to Nuremberg in 1522 and took the Bürgereid ((in German) "Citizen oath"), described as a sculptor.

Two of his most important free-standing sculptures are a 34.5 cm tall limewood figure of a nude man, possibly Adam, in the Kunsthistorisches Museum in Vienna, his only surviving signed sculpture, and the figure of Apollo firing a bow on the Apollo Fountain (1532). The fountain was made for the Herrenschiesshaus in Nuremberg, and cast in bronze by Pankraz Labenwolf.

As a printmaker he produced prints for other artists or artisans to follow as patterns: designs for furniture, altarpiece surrounds, or goldwork, and panels of ornament, as well as book illustrations, playing cards, and a decorative alphabet. He became increasingly a designer of works that were actually made by others, even in media such as gold or bronze that he was trained in himself. Reliefs, medals and similar objects were modelled in carved wood or wax, with drawings for other types of object. Small easily portable metal relief plaques and statuettes were produced in editions and, like his prints, played a leading part in disseminating Italianate style across Northern Europe, following the pattern begun by the prints of Nuremberg's most famous artist, Albrecht Dürer. His plaques appear in a variety of metals, but most often brass, though lead, bronze and gilded ones (illustrated) are also found. At least 17 examples of one design are known. A collection of his prints and designs, the Kunstbuch, was published after his death in 1549.

He designed the sculptural decoration, and possibly the architecture, of the Hirschvogelhaus (destroyed in 1945) and the Tucherschloss villa in Nuremberg. He also made the triumphal arch of Emperor Charles V (no longer standing) and may have contributed to parts of Heidelberg Castle.

Flötner was also interested in Vitruvius's scientific work. Two years after Flötner's death, Petrejus of Nuremberg published the first German translation of Vitruvius, largely on the back of Peter Flötner's previous work. Like Dürer and other artists, he is buried in the Johannisfriedhof cemetery.

Flötner received most attention around 1900. He was seen as one of the finest German architects of his time and a pioneer of Italianesque architecture in the north. Braun (see "sources") emphasized Flötner's importance for Renaissance art, and said "genius" was not too much praise for him. There was a 1945 exhibition of his work in the German National Museum.

== Works designed ==
- Choir stalls and organ in the chapel of Fugger in Augsburg, Germany - 1516-18
- Fountain in Mainz, 1526
- Apollo Fountain in Nuremberg, 1532
- Hirsvogelsaal (Hirschvogel Hall), composition, and interior
- Triumphal arch of Emperor Charles V, Nuremberg - 1541
- Ottheinrichsbau (design of the facade) of the Heidelberg Castle (not certain) 1546–50

== Notes ==
This article was translated from its equivalent in the German Wikipedia on 18 July 2009.
