= Plaquette =

Type of small low relief sculpture

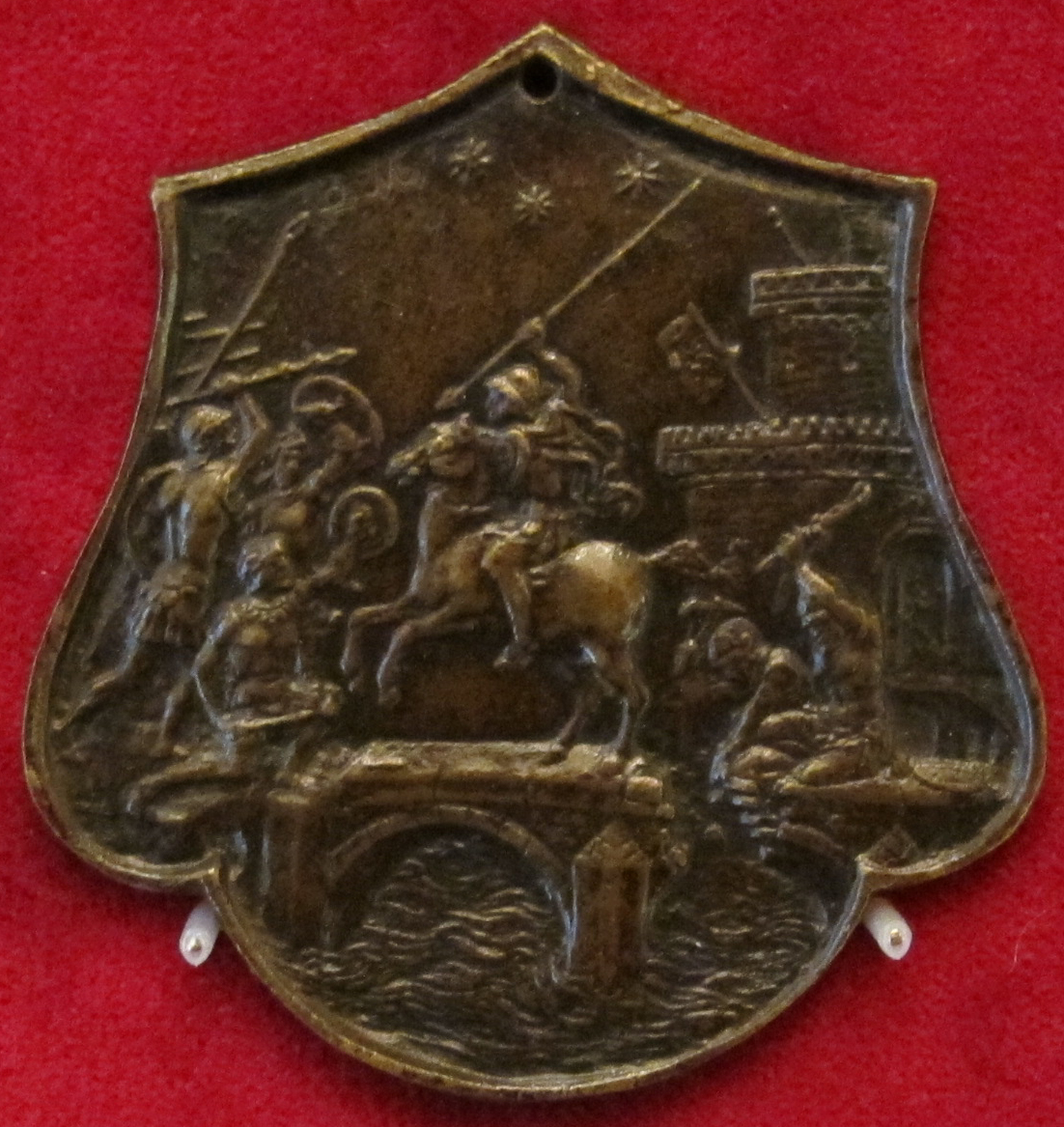
Horatius Cocles at the bridge, Renaissance plaquette by Master IO.F.F., late 15th century, Padua, 6.1 x 6.0 cm, in a shape for decorating a sword hilt

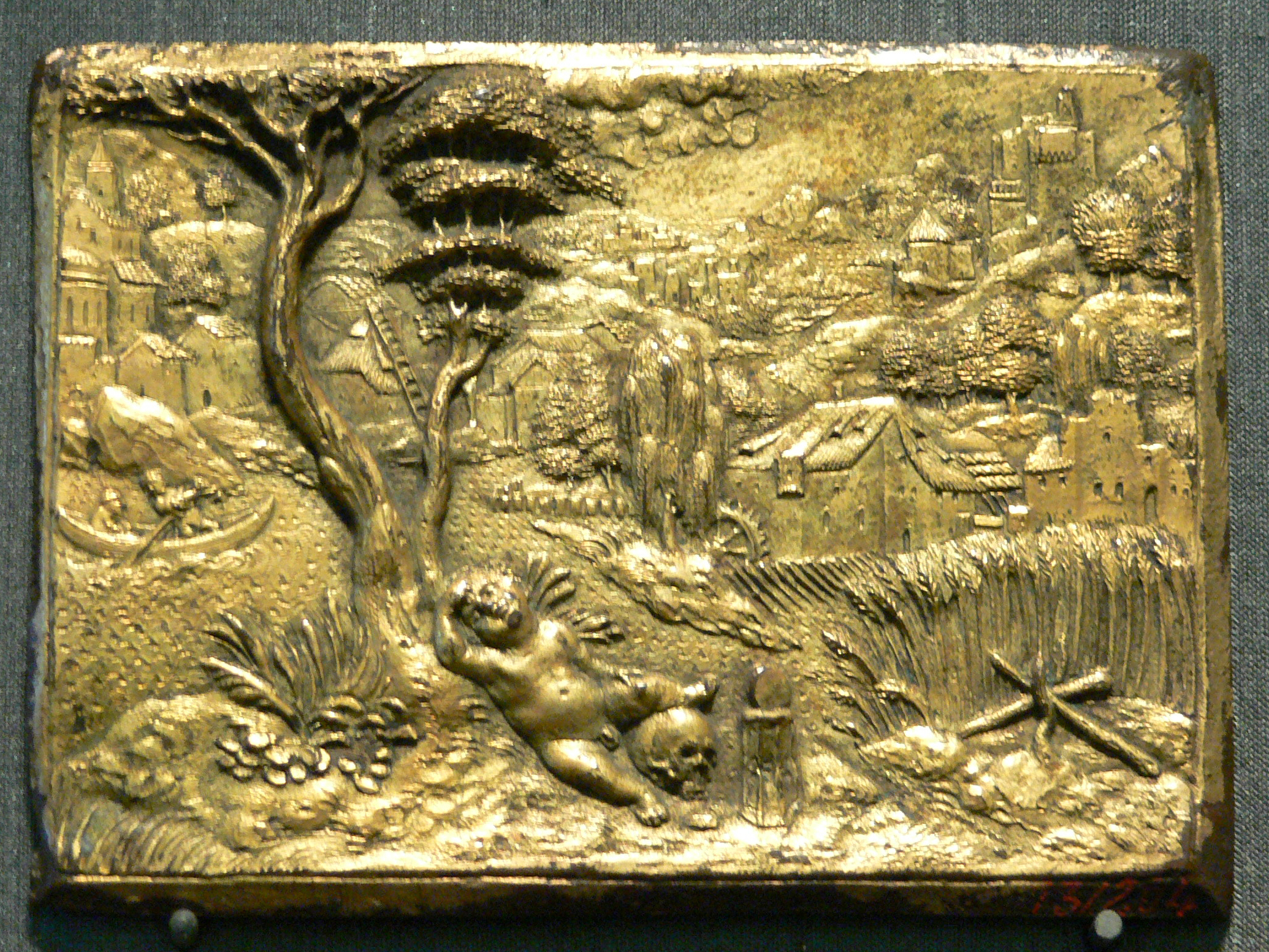
Peter Flötner, Vanitas, 1535–1540, gilt bronze

A plaquette (French: [plakɛt]; "small plaque") is a small low relief sculpture in bronze or other materials. These were popular in Italian Renaissance sculpture and later. They may be commemorative, but especially in the Renaissance and Mannerist periods were often made for purely decorative purposes, with often crowded scenes from religious, historical or mythological sources.

Only one side is decorated, giving the main point of distinction with the artistic medal, where both sides are normally decorated. Most are rectangular or circular, but other shapes are found. Typical sizes range from about two inches up to about seven across a side, or as the diameter, with the smaller end or middle of that range more common. They "typically fit within the hand", as Grove puts it. At the smaller end they overlap with medals, and at the larger they begin to be called plaques. They have always been closely related to the medal, and many awards today are in the form of plaquettes, but plaquettes were less restricted in their subject-matter than the medal, and allowed the artist more freedom.

Plaquettes, like prints, played an important part in the diffusion of styles and trends in iconography, especially for classical subjects. Some drawings for plaquette designs survive; others copied prints, book illustrations and designs in other media, including classical engraved gems and sculpture. In Germany models in wood or limestone might be made. They were often made in sets, illustrating a story, or set of figures.

== Materials and technique ==
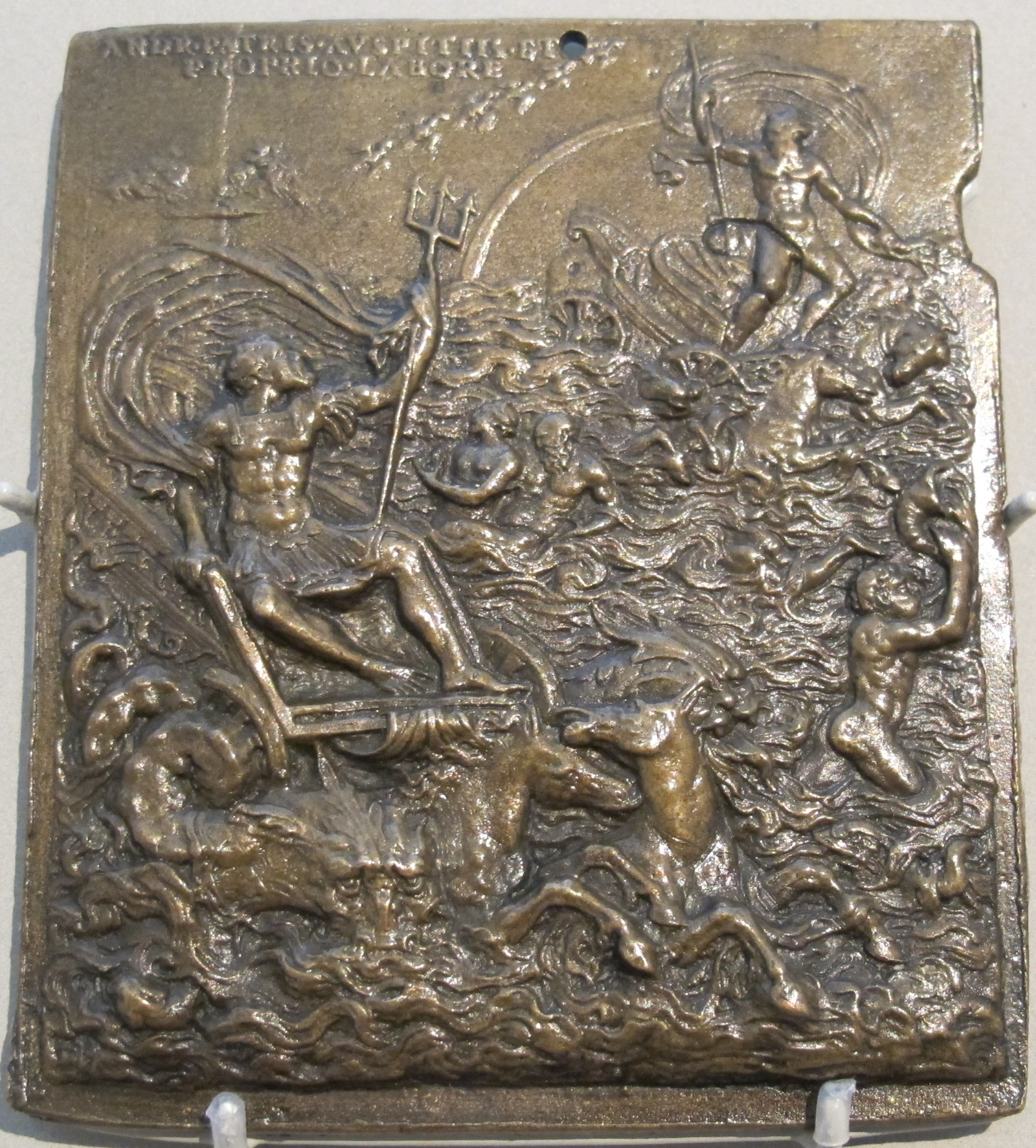
Allegorical Triumph of Giovanni Andrea Doria, Leone Leoni, 1541–42

As with medals, Renaissance plaquettes were normally made using the lost wax technique of casting, and numbers of copies were presumably normally made, although many now only survive in a unique copy, and perhaps never had others. The quality of individual castings can vary considerably, and the time and locations of individual castings from the same mould my vary considerably. Some designs can be shown to have had different generations of casts made from casts. Most are in bronze, but silver and gold, in solid or plated and gilded forms, are also found, as well as other metals. Often plaquettes with copies in precious metal also exist in bronze copies.

In early 16th-century Nuremberg, which was the main German centre, plaquettes, like other metalwork types of objects, were often made in the relatively plebeian material of brass, even by top artists like the Vischer family and Peter Flötner. Lead was also used, especially in German castings intended as artisan's models rather than for collectors.

From the 19th century onwards, cast iron was also used, especially in Germany. In Italy lead was also used for an initial trial cast. The castings were normally not worked much further with tools, beyond polishing and often giving an artificial patina.

== Use ==
The purpose and use of decorative plaquettes was evidently varied and remains somewhat unclear; their creation and use is relatively poorly documented. Some were mounted in furniture, boxes or other objects such as lamps, and many examples have holes for hanging on walls, added later. Other copies have three or four holes, for holding in a setting. Religious subjects in a pair or set might be set into the doors of tabernacles, and many were used for paxes, sometimes after being given a frame. Some shapes were designed for particular roles such as decorating sword hilts, though perhaps not all copies made were used in this way. Others were framed for hanging, but many were probably just kept and displayed loose, perhaps propped up on a shelf or desk, or in drawers or boxes. Many images show signs of wear. Devotional images were probably often carried around in a pocket, a habit that became common with crucifixes in Florence after a plague in 1373. A large part of the market was probably other artists and craftsmen looking for models for other forms. Plaquette bindings are leather bookbindings that incorporate plaquette casts in gesso, often of designs that are also found in metal.

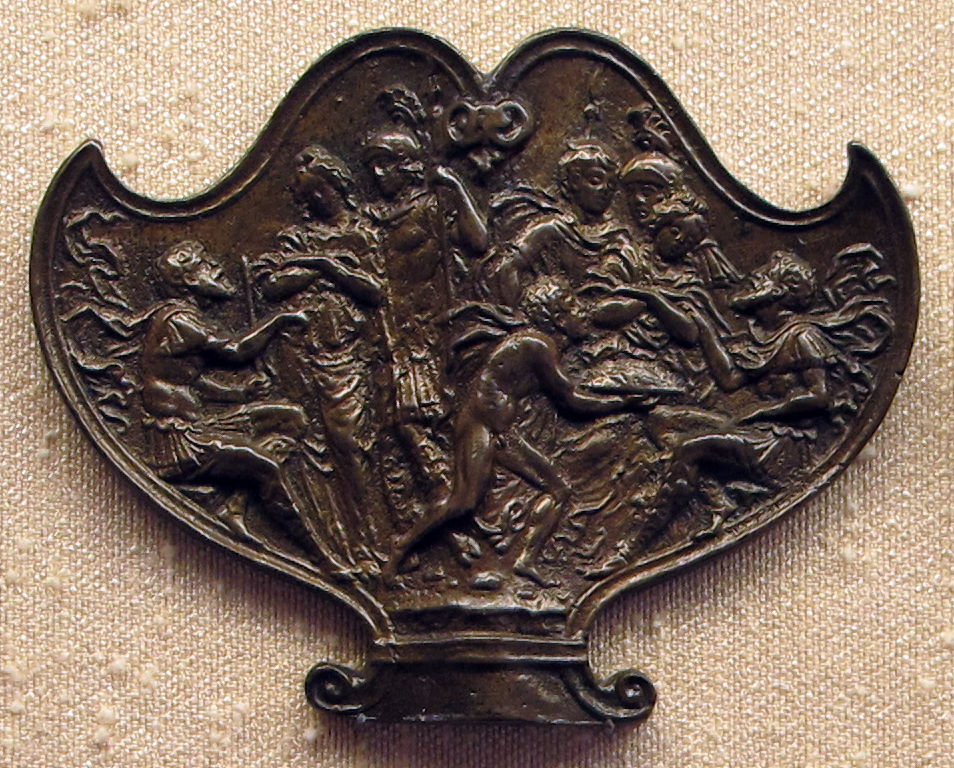
Moderno, The Continence of Scipio, c. 1500–1510, 5.8 x 7.5 cm

Plaquettes were also collected, and in particular 16th-century examples are often crowded with figures, making the scenes hard to read. They are best appreciated when held in the hand near a good light source, and were probably passed round when a collection was shown to fellow connoisseurs. The difficulty of reading the scenes, and an often obscure choice of subjects, suggest that a self-conscious display of classical learning was part of their appeal, for collectors and artists alike. They were one of the types of objects often found in the – normally male – environment of the studiolo and cabinet of curiosities, along with other small forms such as classical coins and engraved gems.

The artists who made them tended to be either sculptors in bronze, also making small figures and objects such as inkwells, or goldsmiths, who often practised in the related field of engraving. They were relatively cheap and transportable, and were soon disseminated widely across Europe, offering an opportunity for artists to display their virtuosity and sophistication, and promote themselves beyond their own city. The same factors, combined with their modern display behind glass, make them relatively little appreciated today. The moulds were also sometimes re-used at considerable distances from their time and place of creation, or new moulds were made from a plaquette. German 17th-century plaquettes were still being used as models for silverware in Regency London.

== History ==
The form began in the 1440s in Italy, but spread across Europe in the next century, especially to France, Germany and the Low Countries. By about 1550 it had fallen from fashion in Italy, but French plaquettes were entering their best period, and there and in Germany they continued to be popular into the 17th century. The form continued to be made at a low level, with something of a revival from about 1850.

The word plaquette is a 19th-century invention by the French art historian Eugene Piot. Les Bronzes de la Renaissance. Les Plaquettes by Émile Molinier of 1886 was the first large study, and these two between them defined the form as it is understood today. To Renaissance Italians plaquettes were known, along with other similar types of objects, by a variety of somewhat vague terms such as piastra and medaglietti, rilievi, or modelli.

=== Italy ===
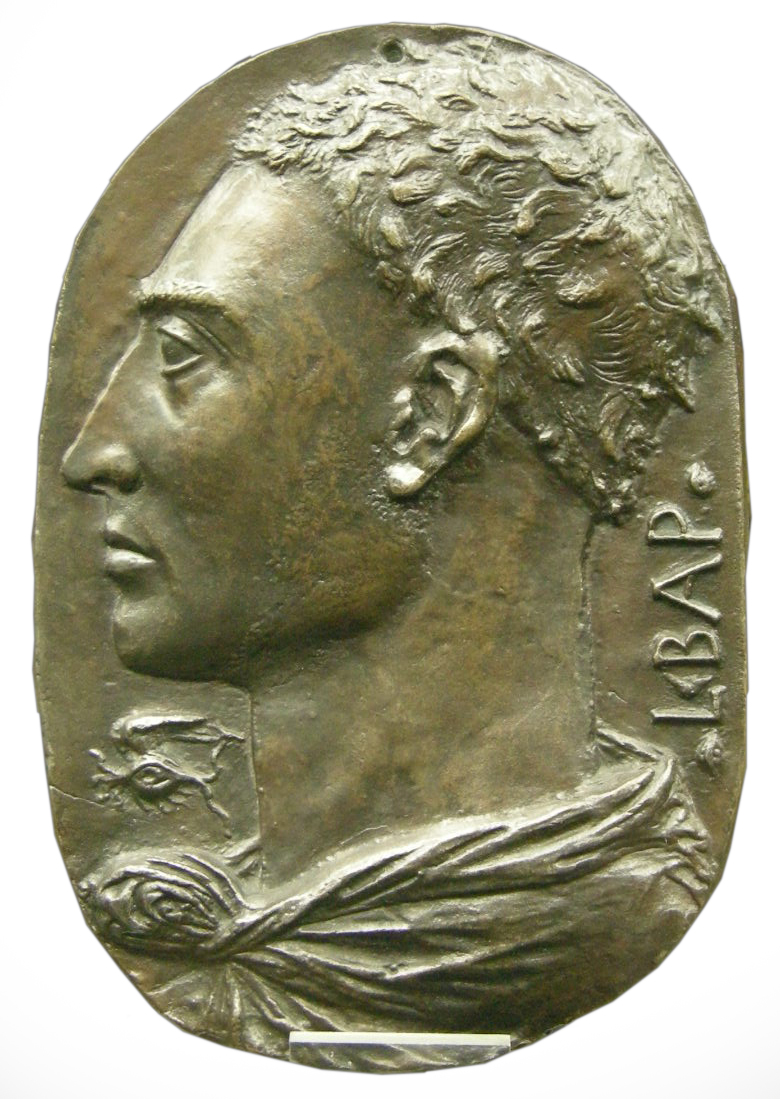
Self-portrait head by Leon Battista Alberti, c. 1435, 20.1 cm high

Plaquettes grew from two rather different Italian origins. In Rome in the 1440s and 1450s they began as a way of reproducing the designs of classical engraved gems, by taking a wax impression of them. The Venetian Pietro Barbo (1417–1471) became a cardinal when his uncle was elected Pope Eugenius IV in 1431. He became an enthusiastic pioneer of this form, maintaining a foundry in his new Palazzo Venezia, and perhaps participating in the casting himself. These plaquettes had the same small size and classical subject matter as the gems they replicated.

Around the same time north Italian artists began making plaquettes, often much larger and with religious subject matter. Padua, already an important centre of metalworking, is seen by many historians as the crucial location. Two significant works, neither typical of later examples, were the self-portrait head by Leon Battista Alberti, oval and 20 cm high, and a slightly larger circular Madonna and Child with putti by Donatello (Victoria and Albert Museum, London). This remained highly unusual in that the reverse is concave and repeats the design. Other larger religious reliefs by Donatello were copied or adapted in a smaller plaquette format by other artists, probably including his own workshop. These grew out of a wider context of small religious images that represented mass-produced versions for the middle classes of the larger and unique religious art made for the rich and for churches. Also in the 1440s Pisanello was establishing the genre of the double-sided portrait medal, followed by Matteo de' Pasti and others. By the later decades of the century medals and plaquettes were being produced in most of the north Italian artistic centres.

Significant later artists included Moderno (as he signed many of his works), who was very likely Galleazzo Mondella, a goldsmith from Verona recorded in Rome around 1500. Some 45 plaquettes are signed by or attributed to him (and hardly any medals), and a number of members of his workshop have been identified by their styles. Andrea Riccio, Giovanni Bernardi, Francesco di Giorgio Martini, Valerio Belli, and Leone Leoni, are among the artists to whom a clear name can be attached. Many significant unidentified masters are given notnames by art historians, such as Moderno and Master IO.F.F., who often signed their works. Belli and Bernardi were the leaders in the luxury form of small intaglios engraved in rock crystal, and several of these were reproduced in plaquette form around 1520–40, some cast from wax impressions taken off the crystals. Riccio was also a sculptor of small bronzes, and his plaquettes tended to have a relatively high relief. He had a large workshop and many followers.

==== Italian examples ====
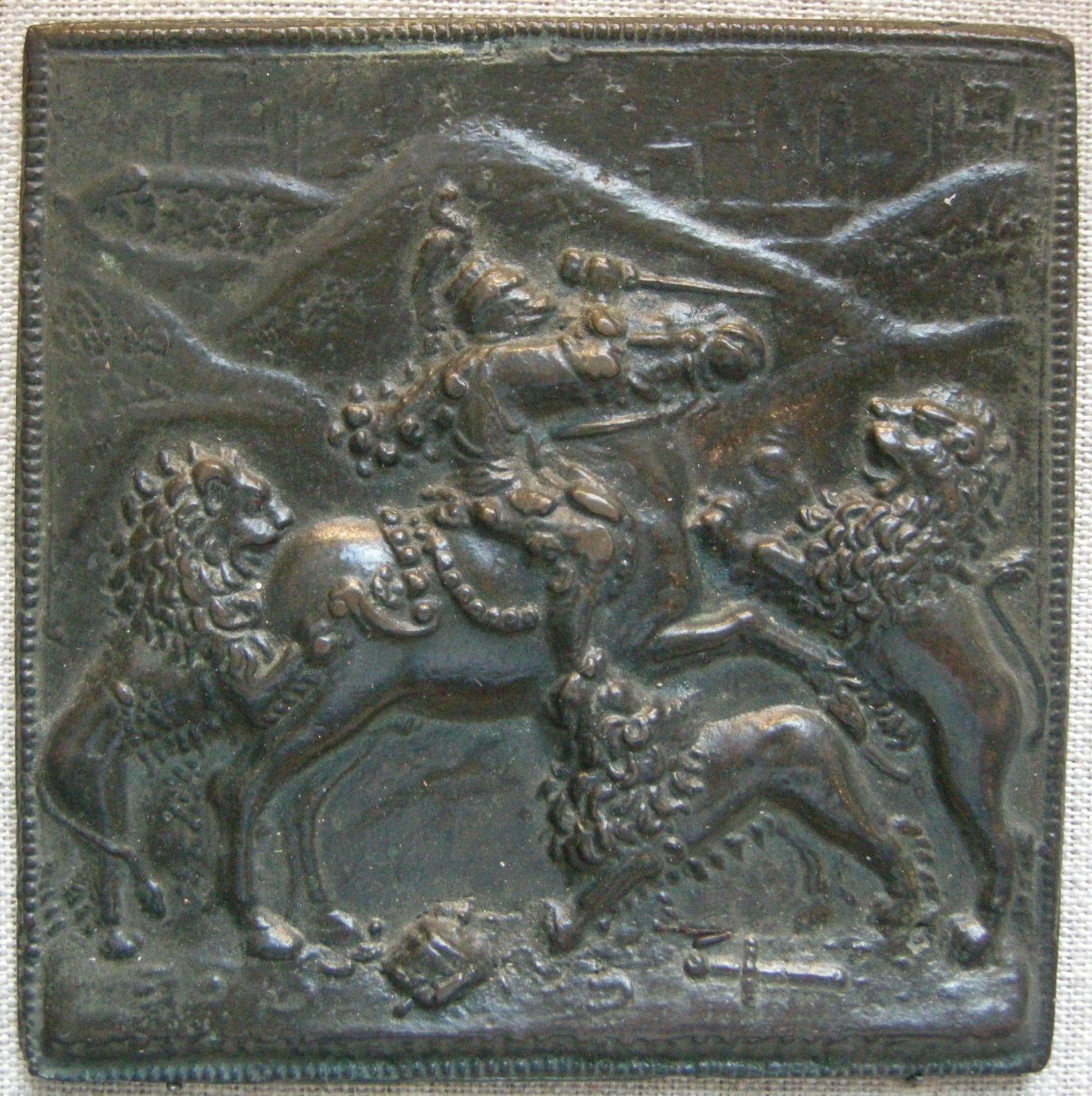
Knight attacked by three lions, Italian, c. 1465

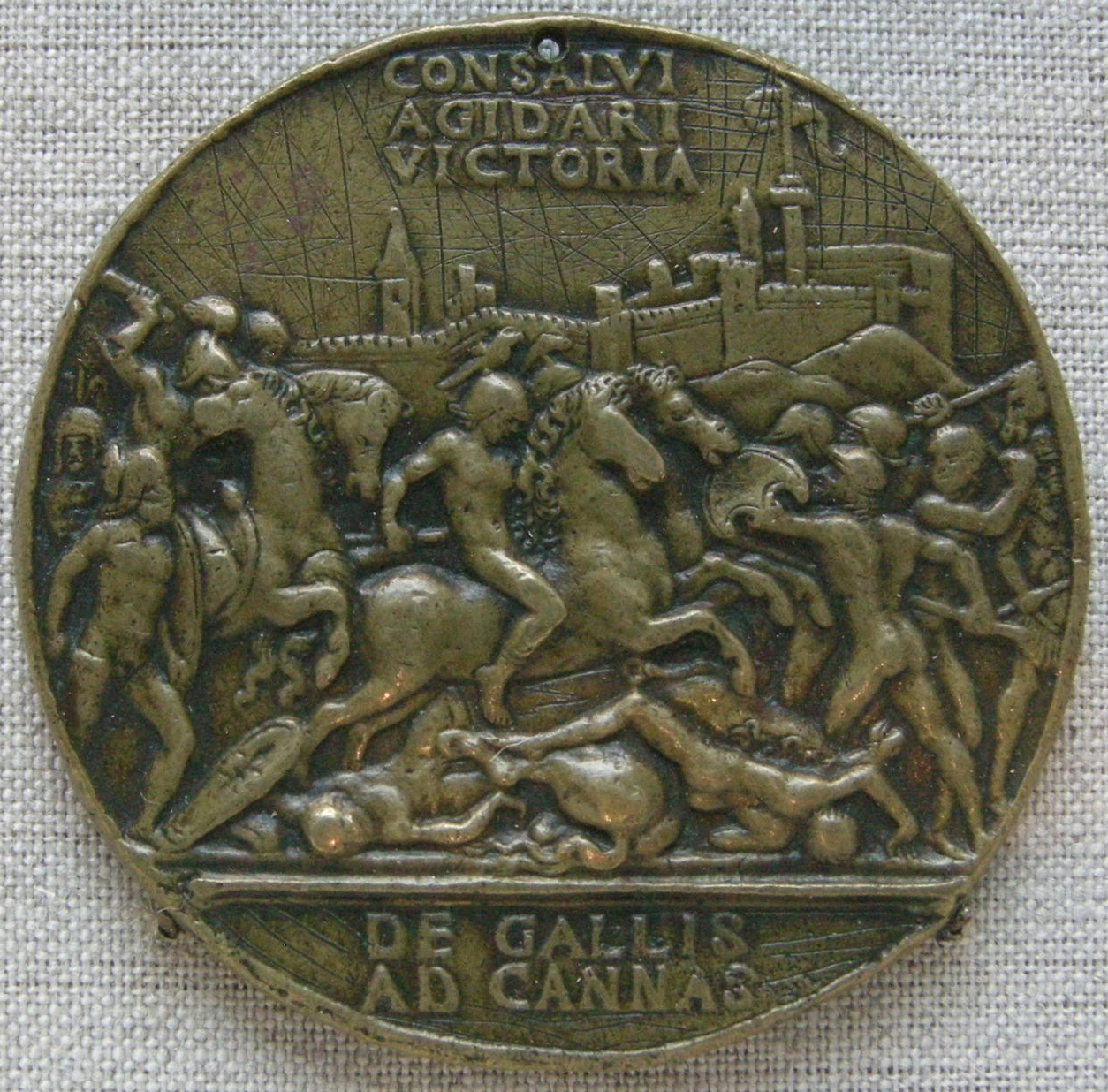
Moderno, Battle of Cannae, 1503–04

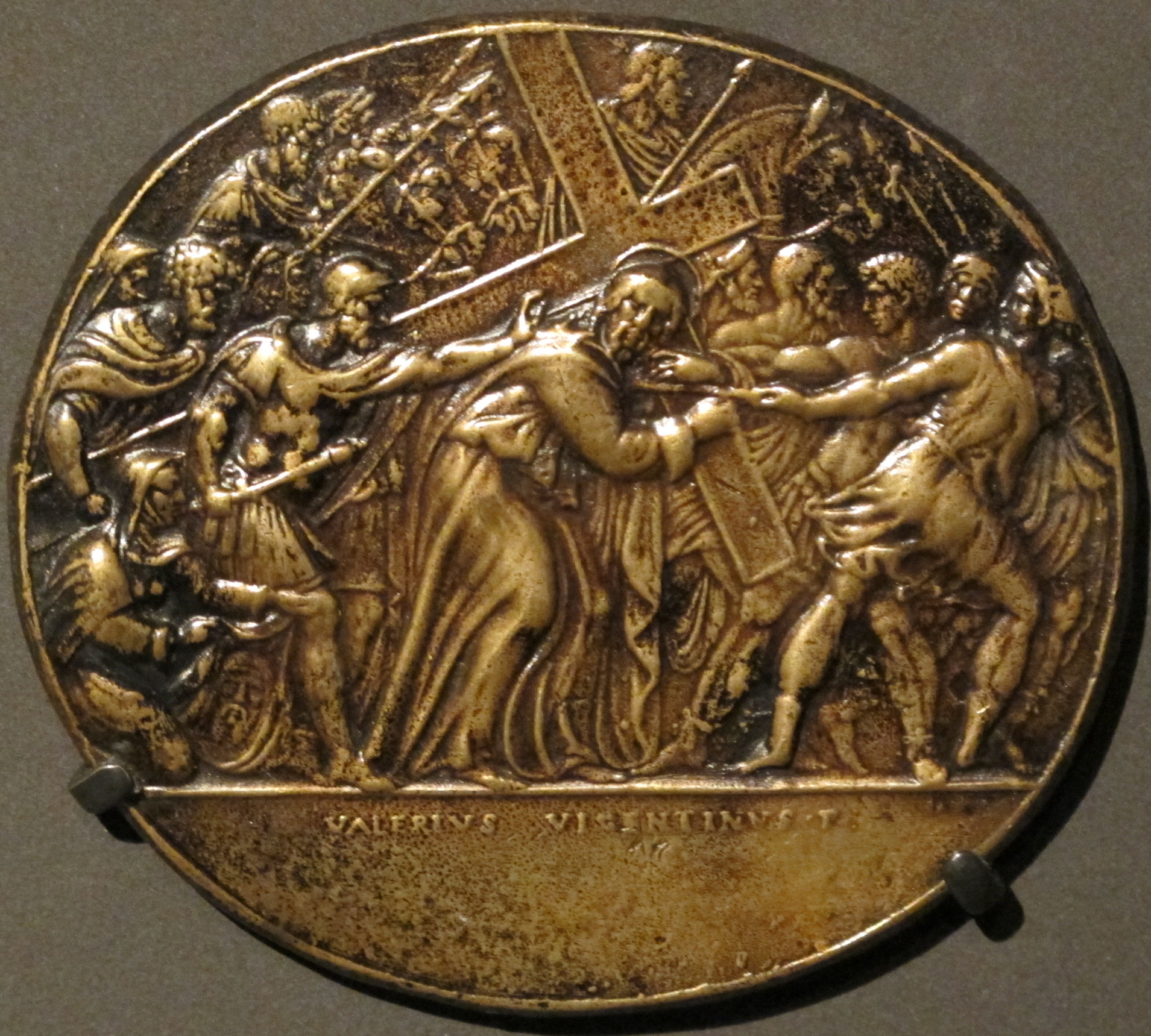
Valerio Belli, Christ Carrying the Cross, 1530–50

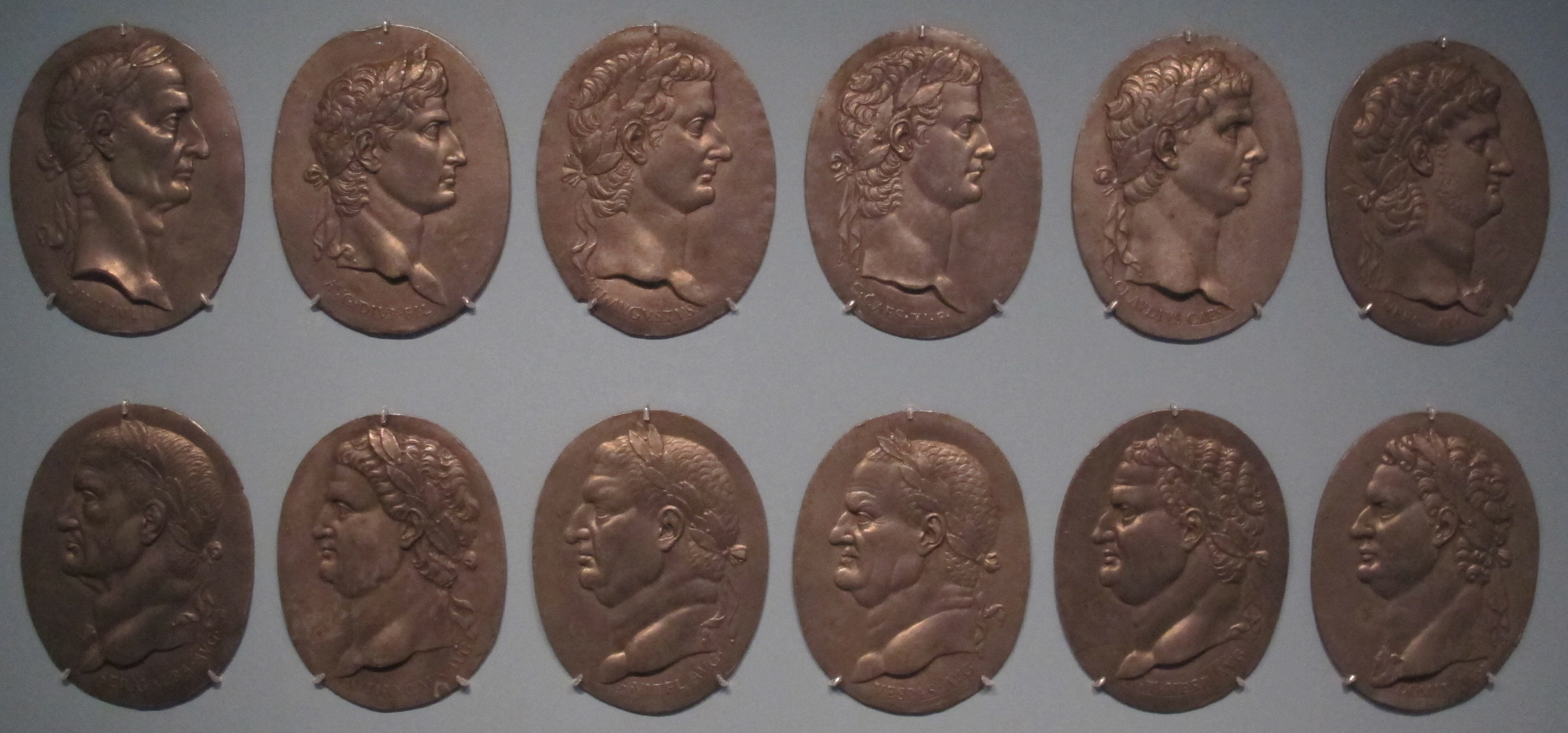
Giovanni Cavino, set of 1st 12 Roman emperors, Padua, c. 1550

=== Germany ===
German production began in Nuremberg, around 1500, but by 1600 Augsburg was the main centre. German examples tended to draw their designs from prints, and were in turn frequently reused in other media, and perhaps more often produced primarily as models for other trades. The repeated reuse of moulds, and their distribution far from their place of making, are especially typical of south German plaquettes. Even fewer of the artists involved are known than in Italy. Production lasted well into the 17th century, when it became involved in the "Dürer revival", with several of his prints being turned into plaquettes.

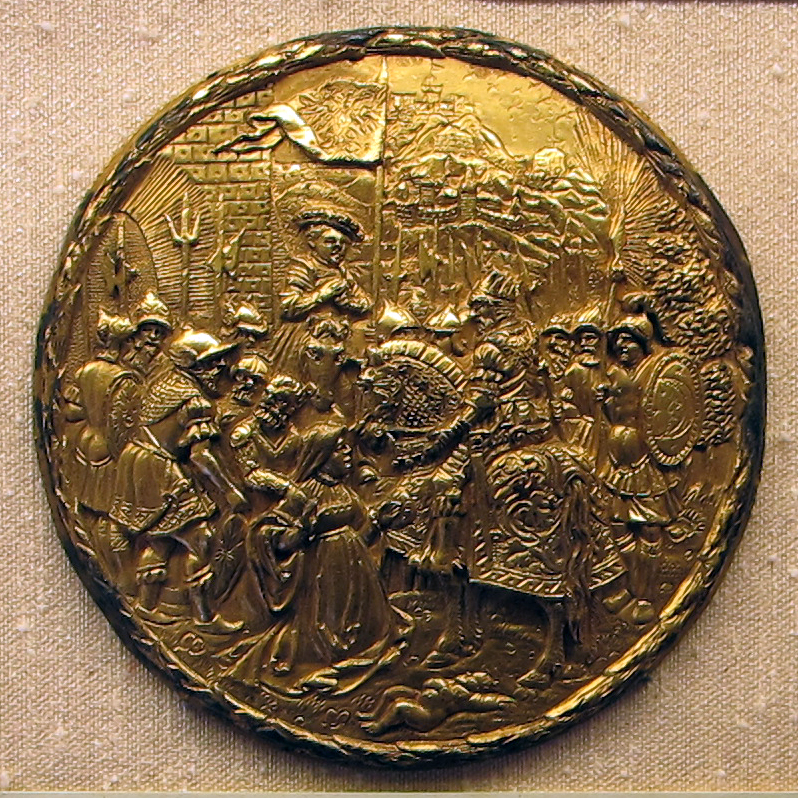
Master of the Heroic Antique Legends, Justice of Trajan, 1525–50

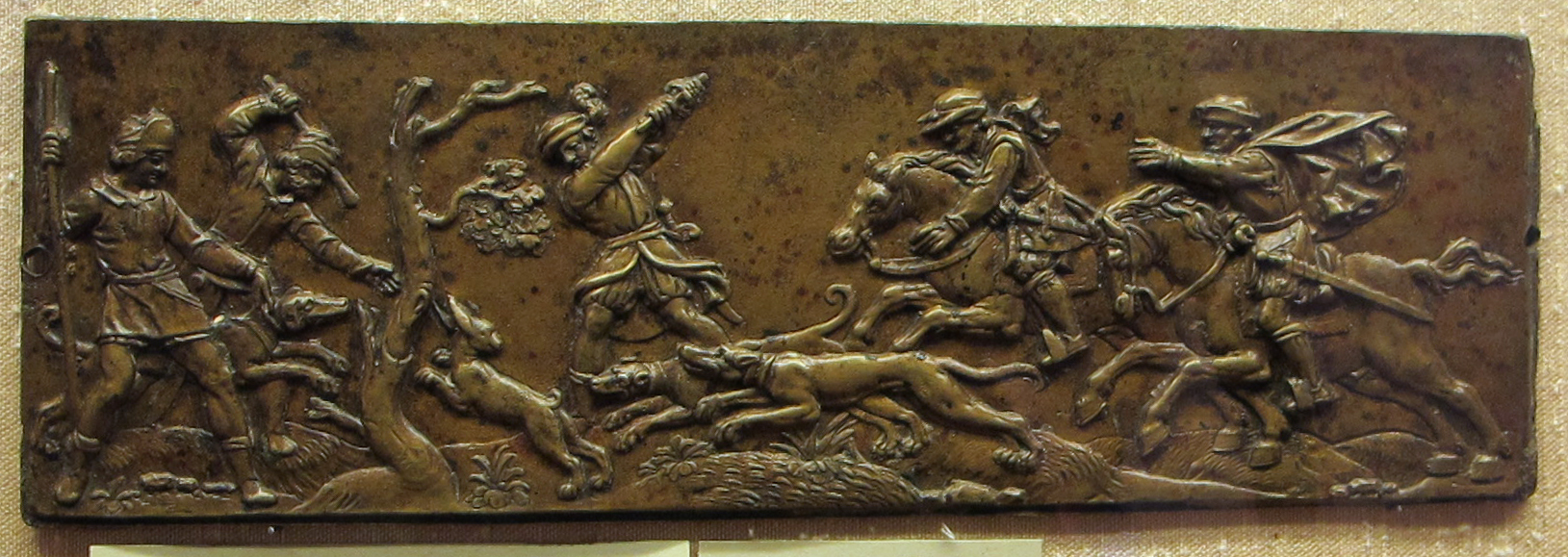
Georg Labenwolf, Hunt for hares, c. 1550

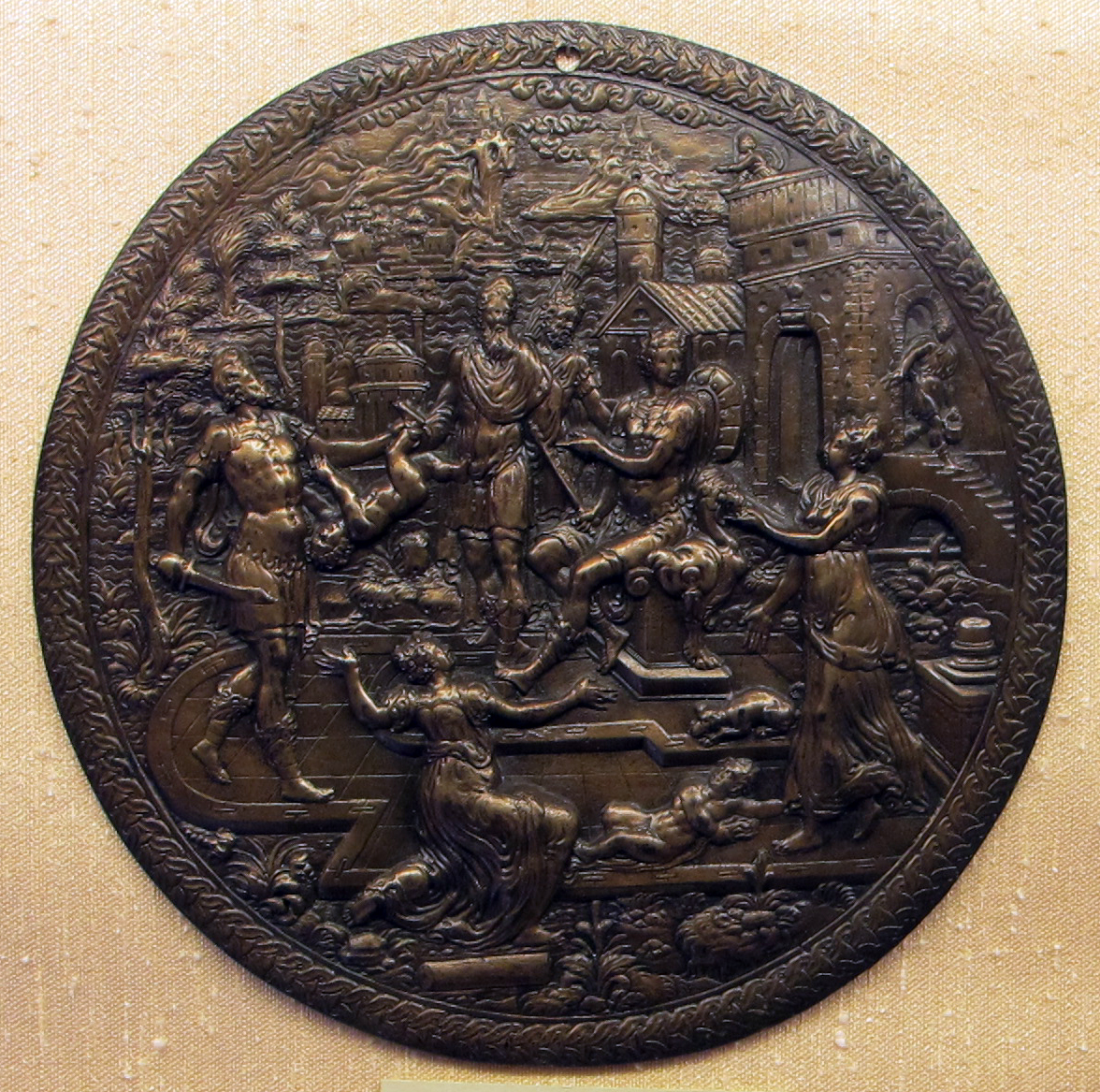
Workshop of Hans Jamnitzer, Judgement of Solomon, c. 1575

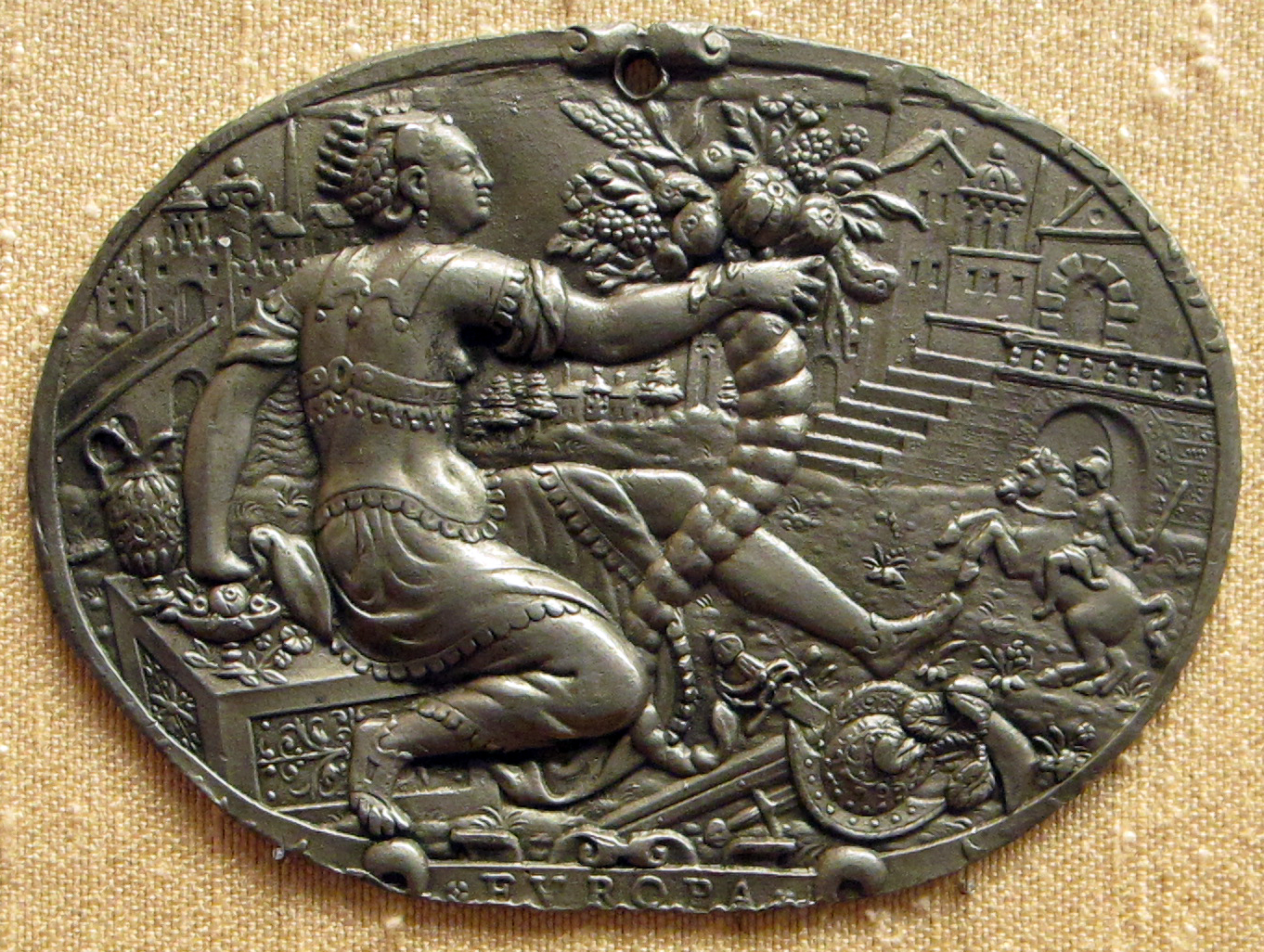
Caspar Enderlein, Europe, 1610–11

=== France and the Netherlands ===
Further north plaquettes were produced from around 1550, initially under influence more from Germany than Italy. Artists (often Huguenot in France) included Étienne Delaune, who mostly lived in Strasbourg, and François Briot from Lorraine. François Duquesnoy from Brussels worked as a sculptor in Rome from 1618, and influenced Flemish plaquettes.

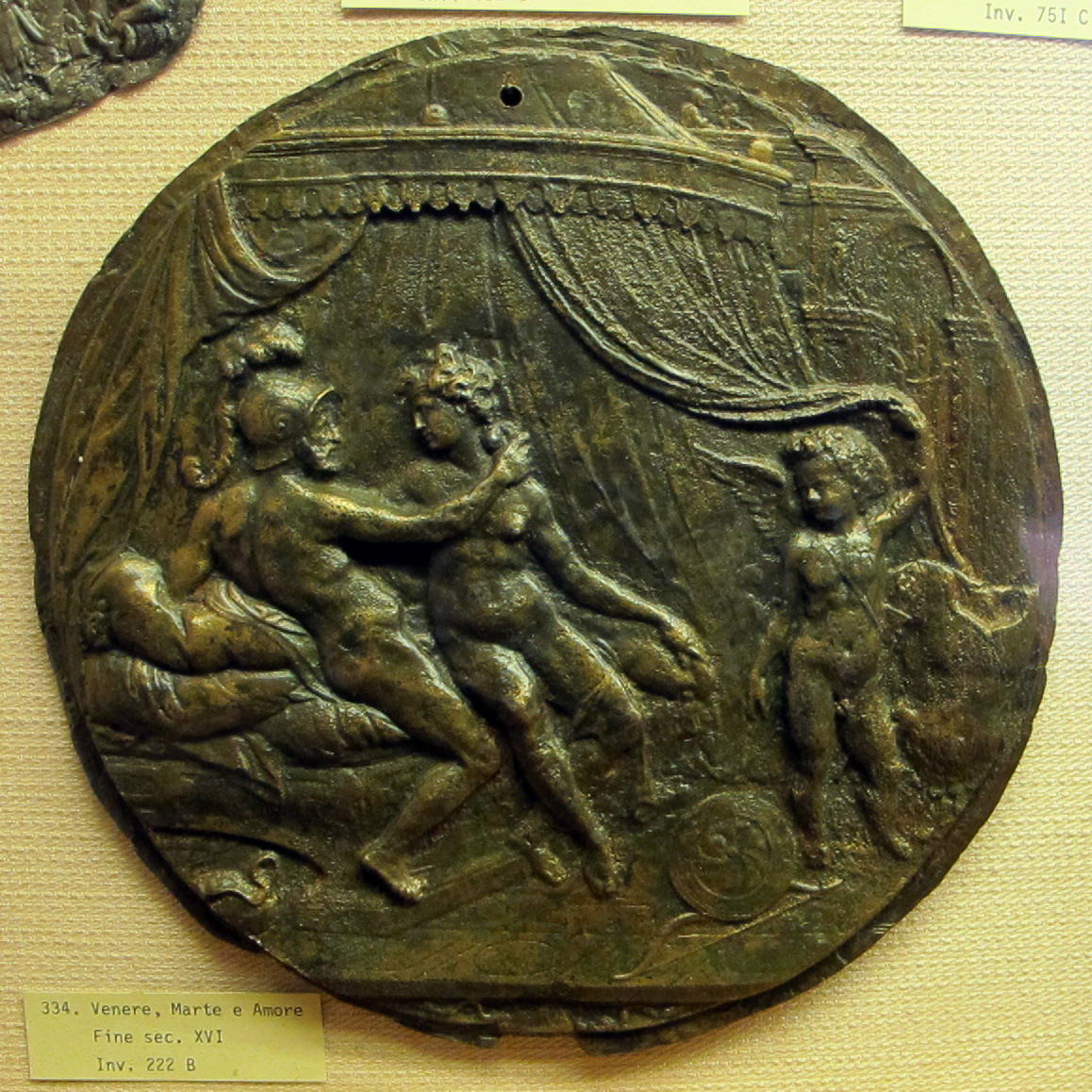
Venus, Mars and Cupid, c. 1590

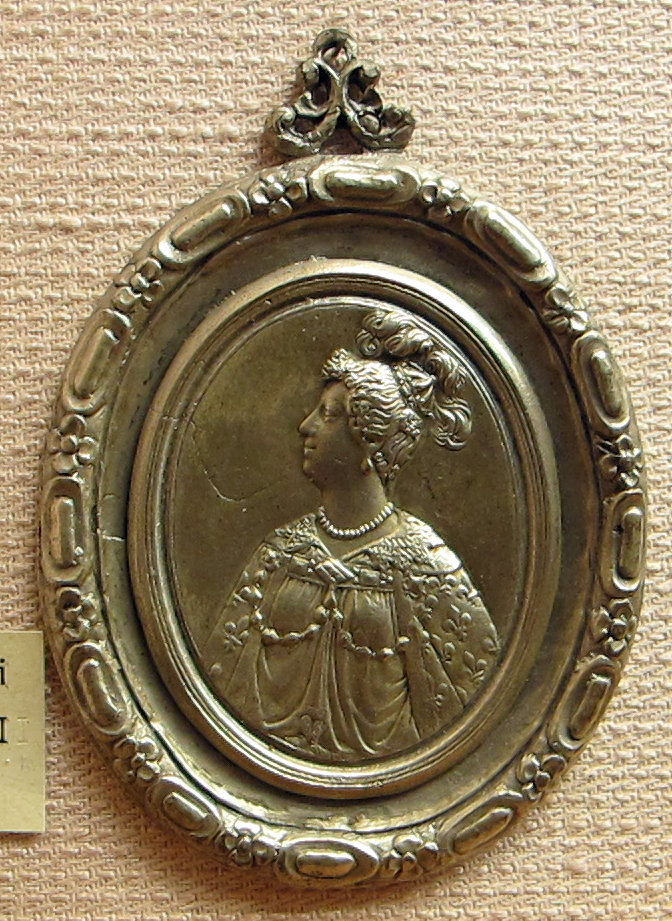
Marie de' Medici, 1600–10

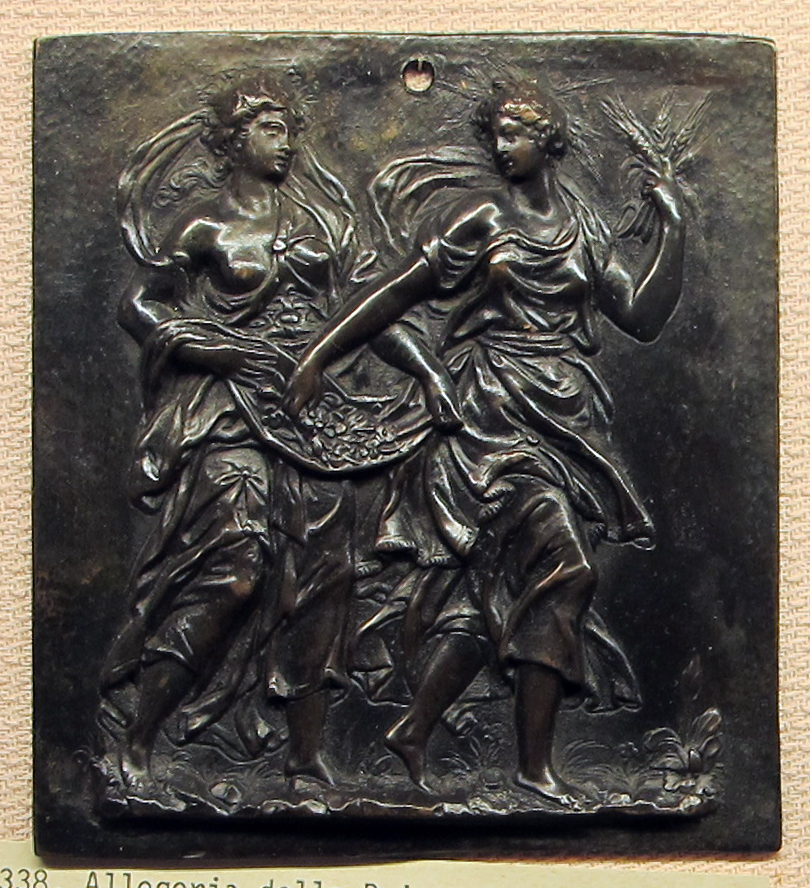
Allegory of Spring and Summer, 1600–10

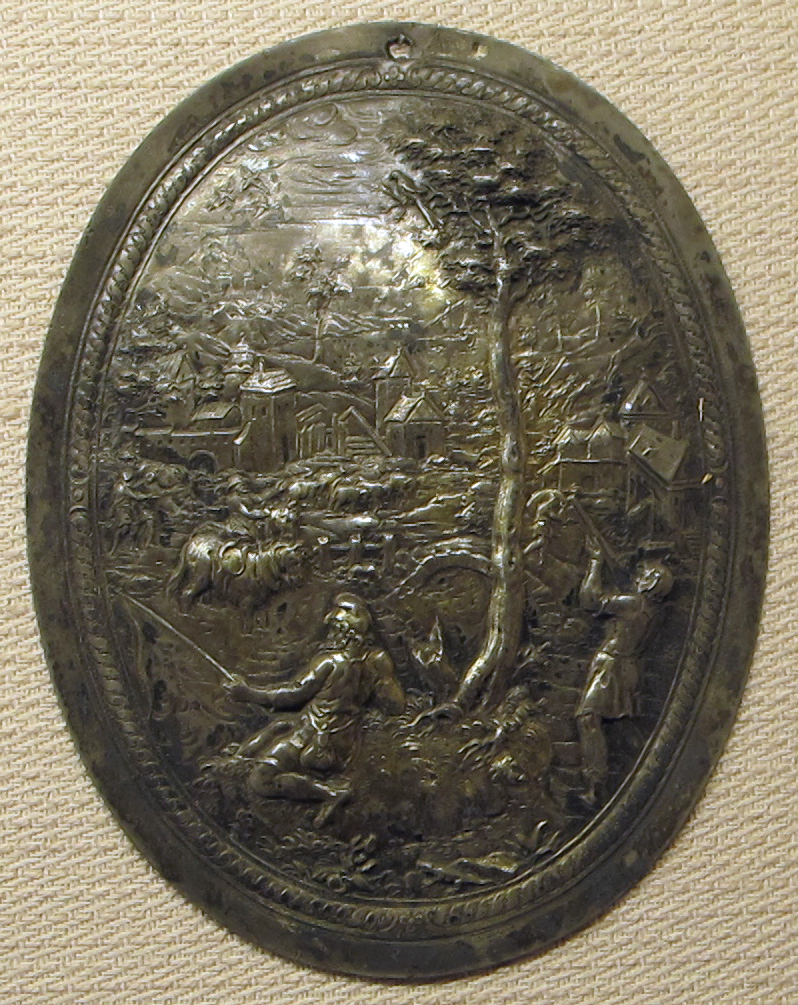
Low Counties, hunting scene, 17th century

=== Later history ===
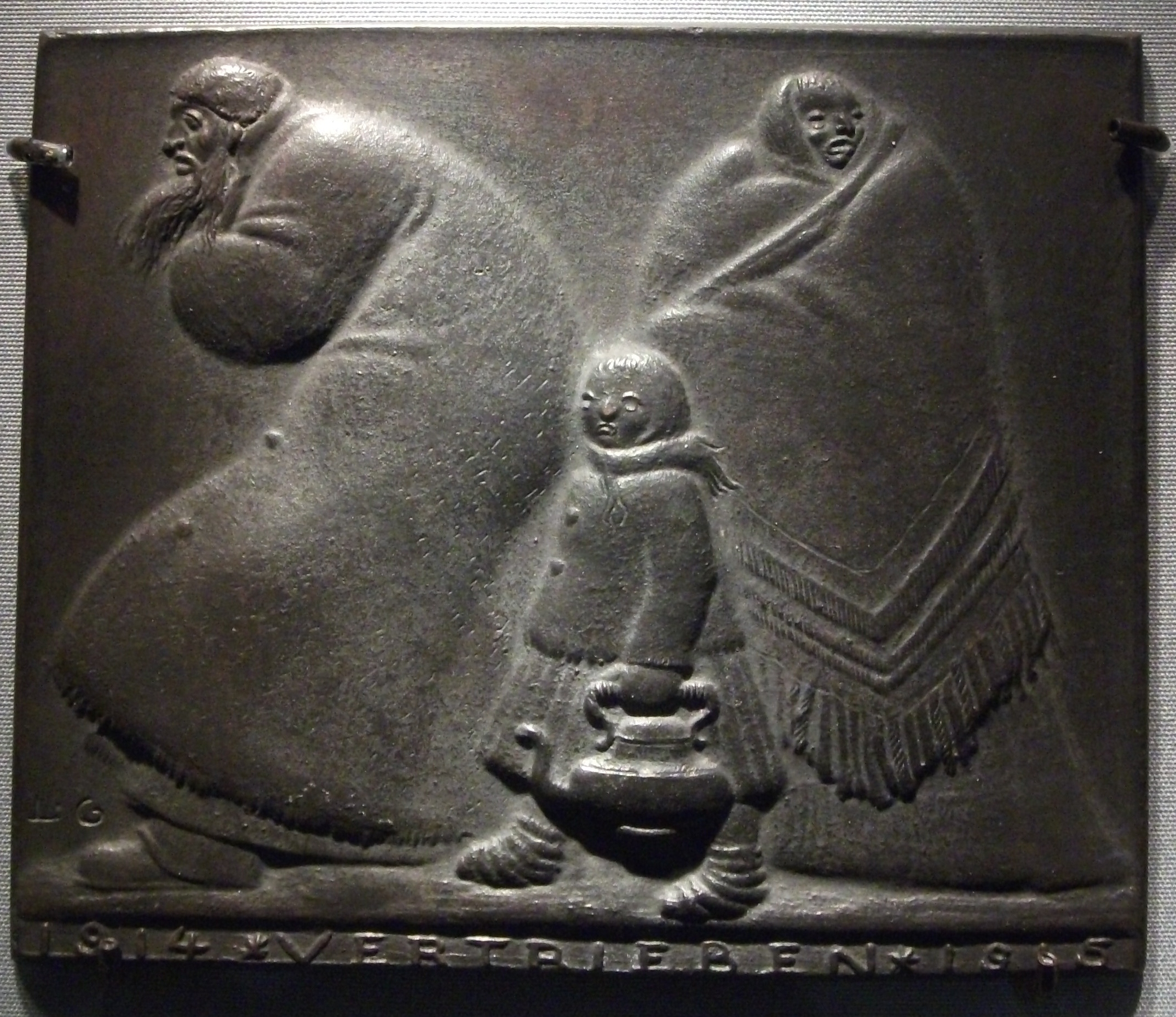
Ludwig Gies, cast iron, 8x9.8cm, inscribed "1914·VERTRIEBEN·1915" ("Refugees 1914–1915")

The form saw a small revival in the 19th century; examples from this period are typically rather larger than in the Renaissance. Artists such as, in America, Augustus Saint-Gaudens and Emil Fuchs made commemorative portrait plaquettes of figures such as Leo Tolstoy and Mark Twain (both by Saint-Gaudens).

Especially in France and Germany, commemorative plaquettes for industry and institutions involved a wide range of contemporary subject matter. A number of artists produced examples purely because they were attracted by the form, or the possibility of reaching a wider market. A number of regular awards by institutions chose the plaquette form, though often retaining "medal" in the name of the award. The circular so-called "death penny" (the Memorial Plaque) minted in the UK after World War I is a large twentieth-century commemorative example.

As well as continuing production purely as artworks, many modern awards are in the form of plaquettes. The Swedish Film Academy's Silver Plaquette was awarded to filmmakers in some years between 1968 and 1994. As of 2024 current examples include plaquettes as awards for archery, tennis, community, and singing.

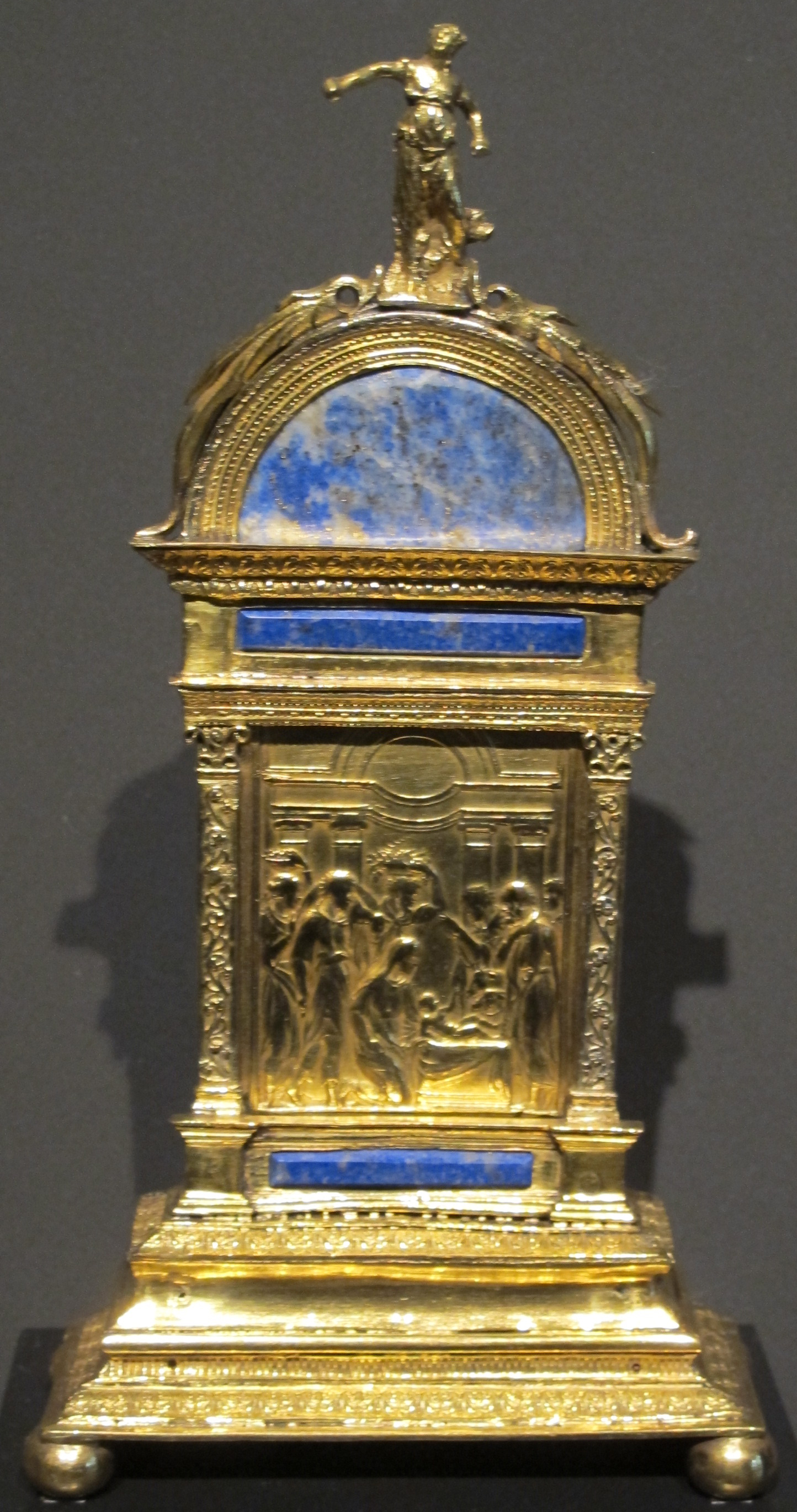
Pax with plaquette by Valerio Belli

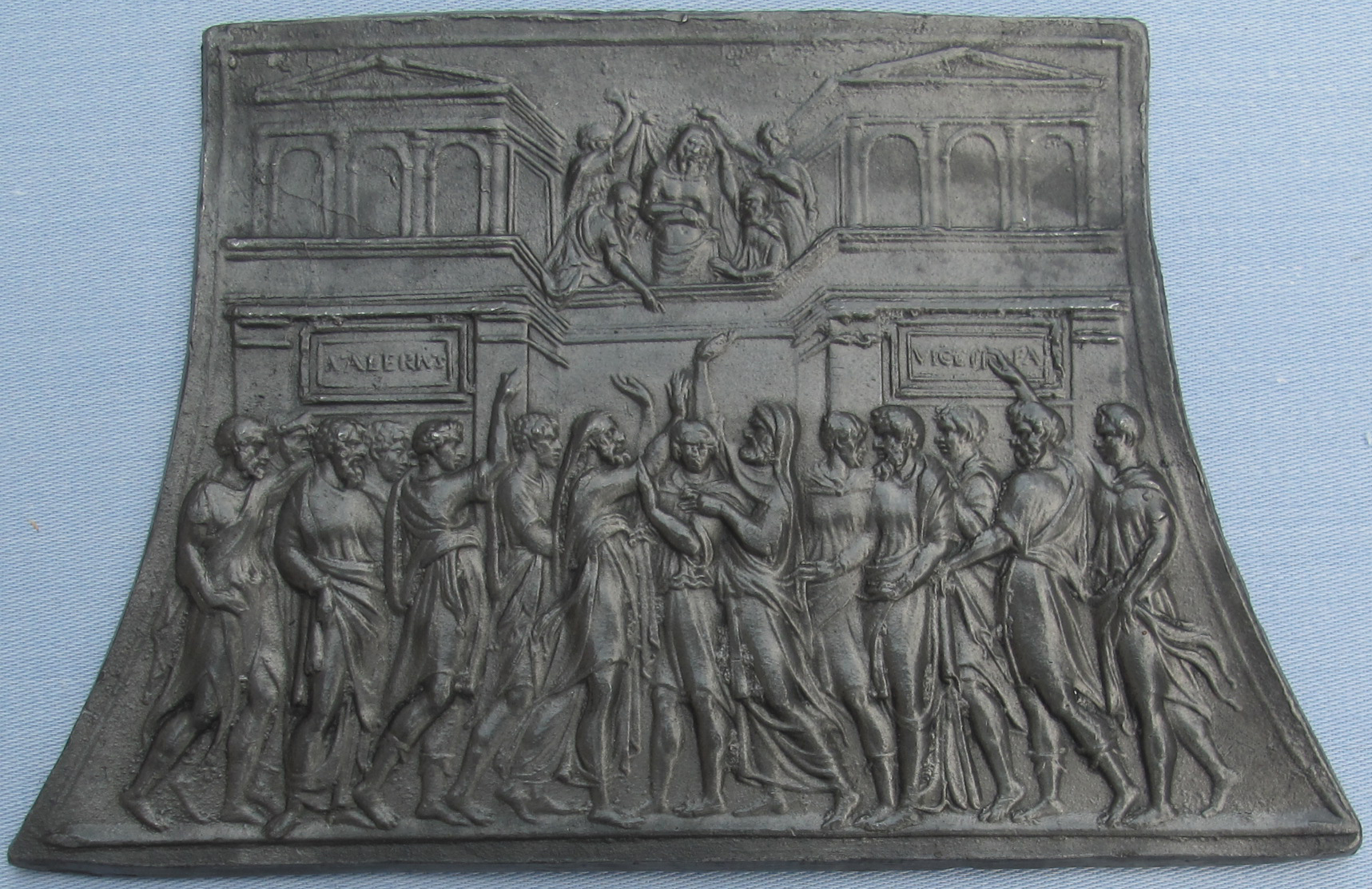
Valerio Belli, 1532, Ecce Homo, one of a set of four, for an inkpot or similar object

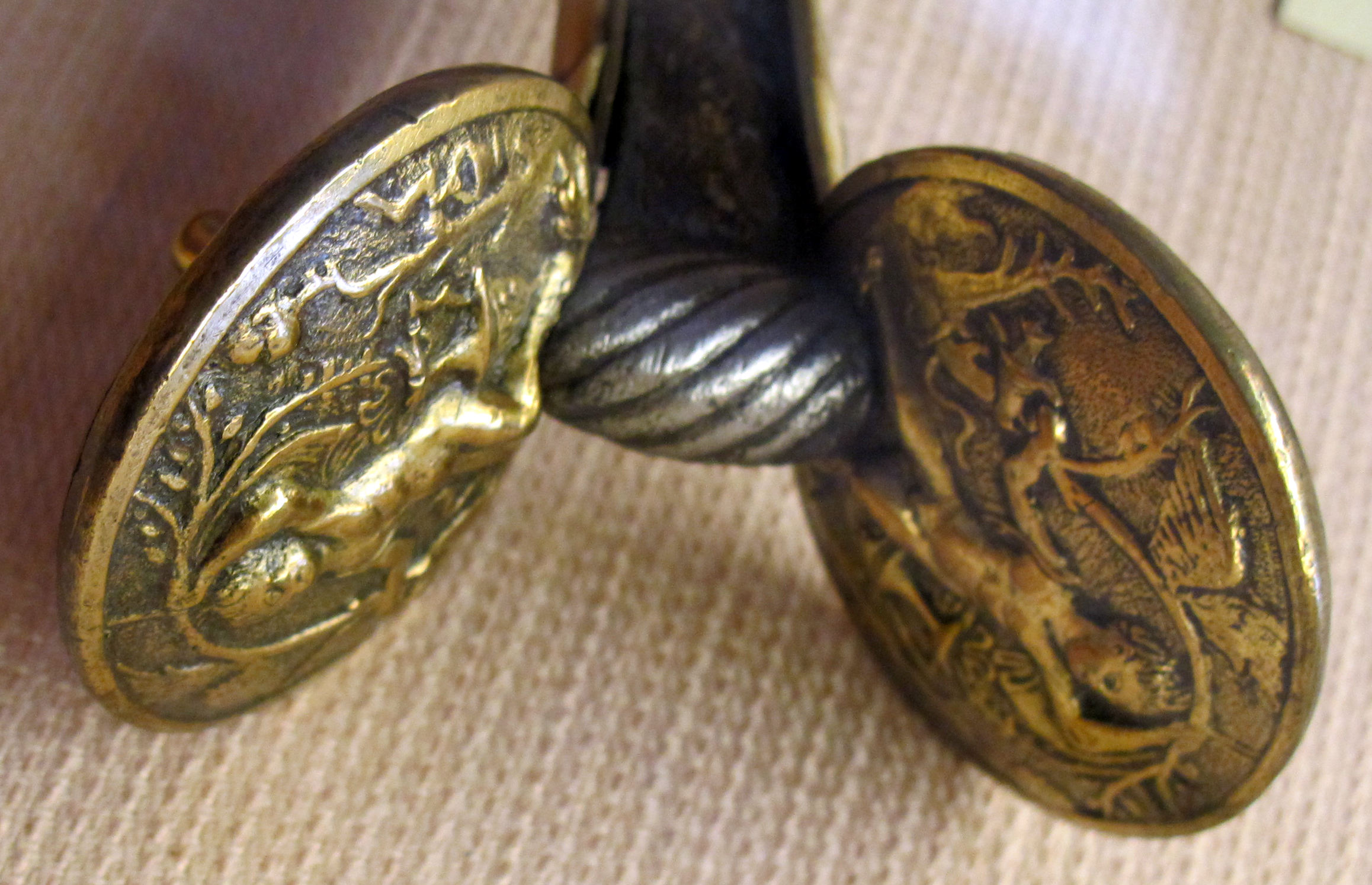
Two small plaquettes by Riccio used in a dagger hilt

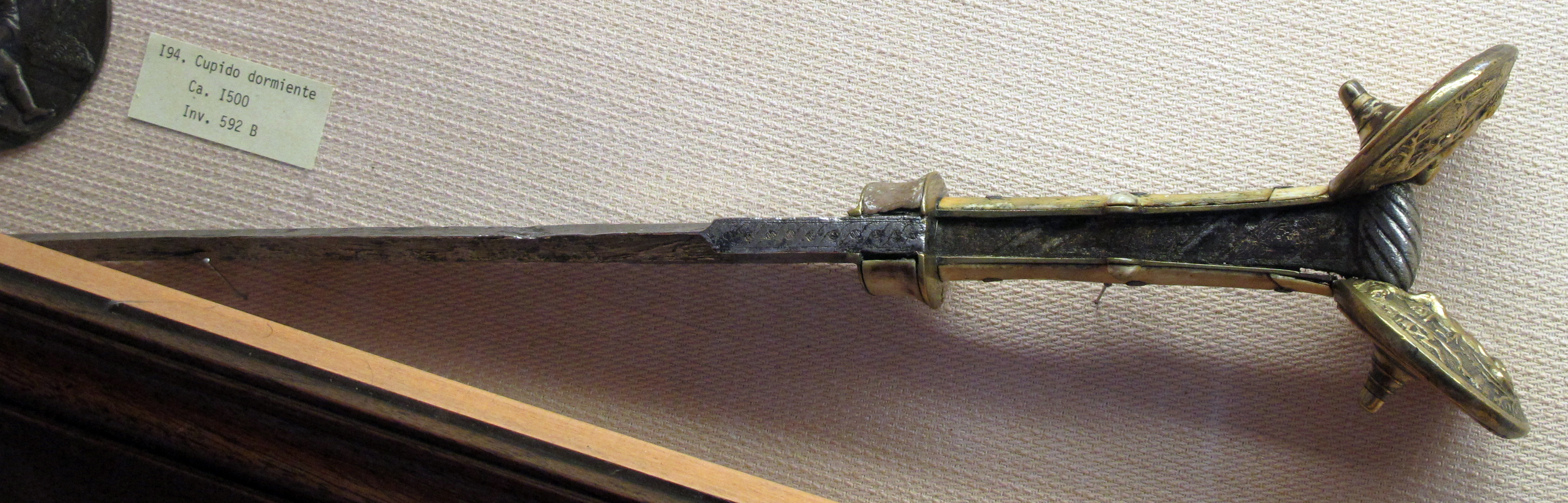
Another view

== Collections ==
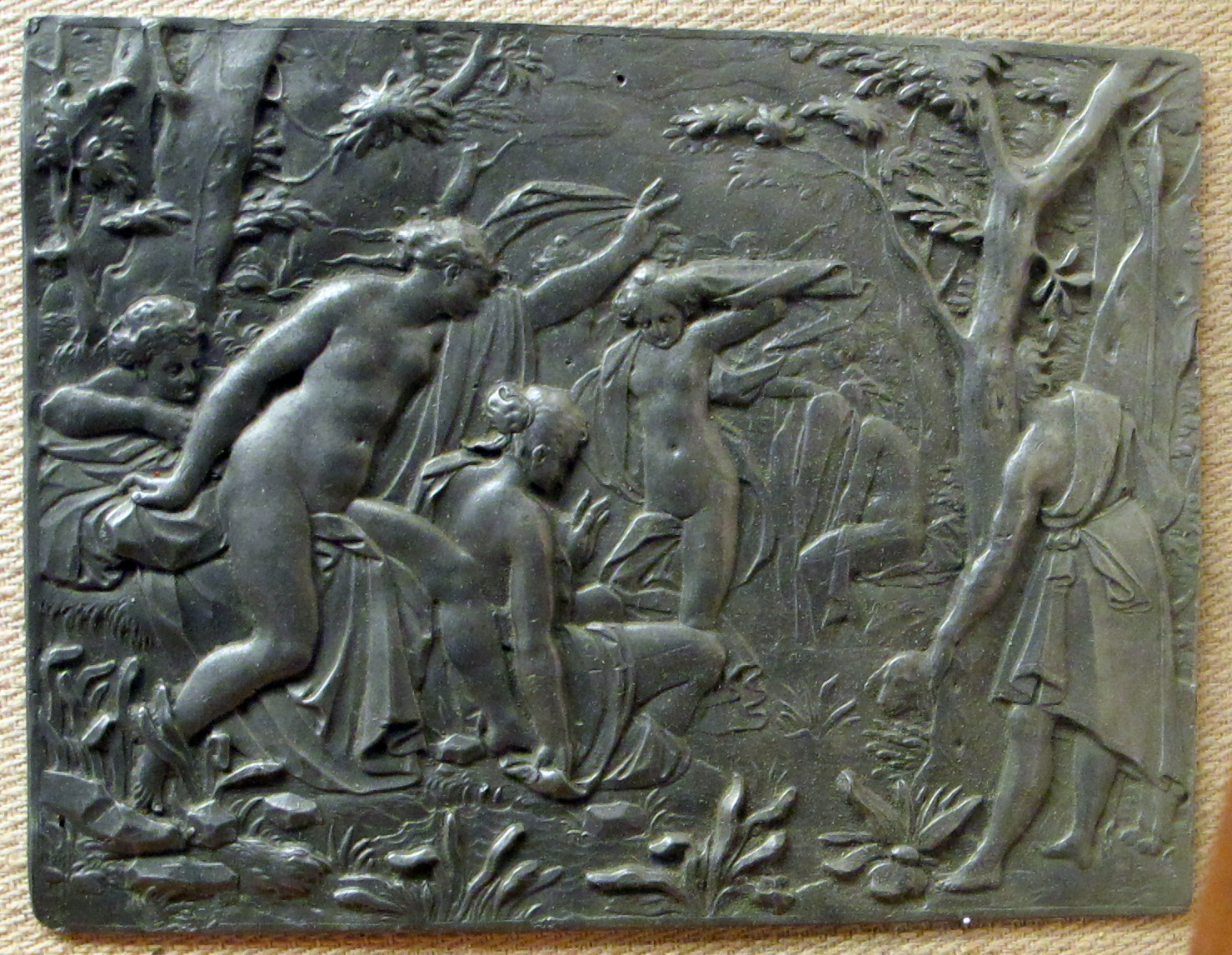
Low countries, c. 1610, Diana and Actaeon, in lead

Many major museums have collections, which are not always given room in the gallery displays. The National Gallery of Art in Washington D.C., despite being essentially a collection of paintings, has what is recognised as the finest single collection, especially of Italian Renaissance work, which includes over 450 plaquettes, and is very well displayed on the ground floor.

The Washington collection of medals, plaquettes and small bronzes includes the leading French collection assembled by Gustave Dreyfus (1837–1914), which was bought by Samuel H. Kress (1863–1955). In 1945 the Kress Foundation added over 1,300 bronzes collected by the British art dealer Lord Duveen, and donated all its collection to the museum in 1957. Joseph E. Widener had already given the museum a significant collection in 1942.

The Wallace Collection in London has a good smaller display, as do the Victoria and Albert Museum, the Cabinet des médailles, Paris, the Hermitage Museum, the Ashmolean in Oxford, and a number of German museums, although the outstanding Berlin collection was lost in World War II. Not much of the British Museum's important collection is on display, nor that of the Vatican Museums.

The Bargello in Florence has some 400 plaquettes, about half from the collection of the Medici family, who played an important role in the development of the form. Most of the rest are from the collection of Louis Carrand, who bequeathed it to Florence. After that of Drefus, this is the next most important collection assembled in Paris in the 19th century and still intact. Paris was then the centre of plaquette collecting.

== See also ==
- Royal Copenhagen 2010 plaquettes – modern ceramic examples
- Commemorative plaque
