= Valerio Belli =

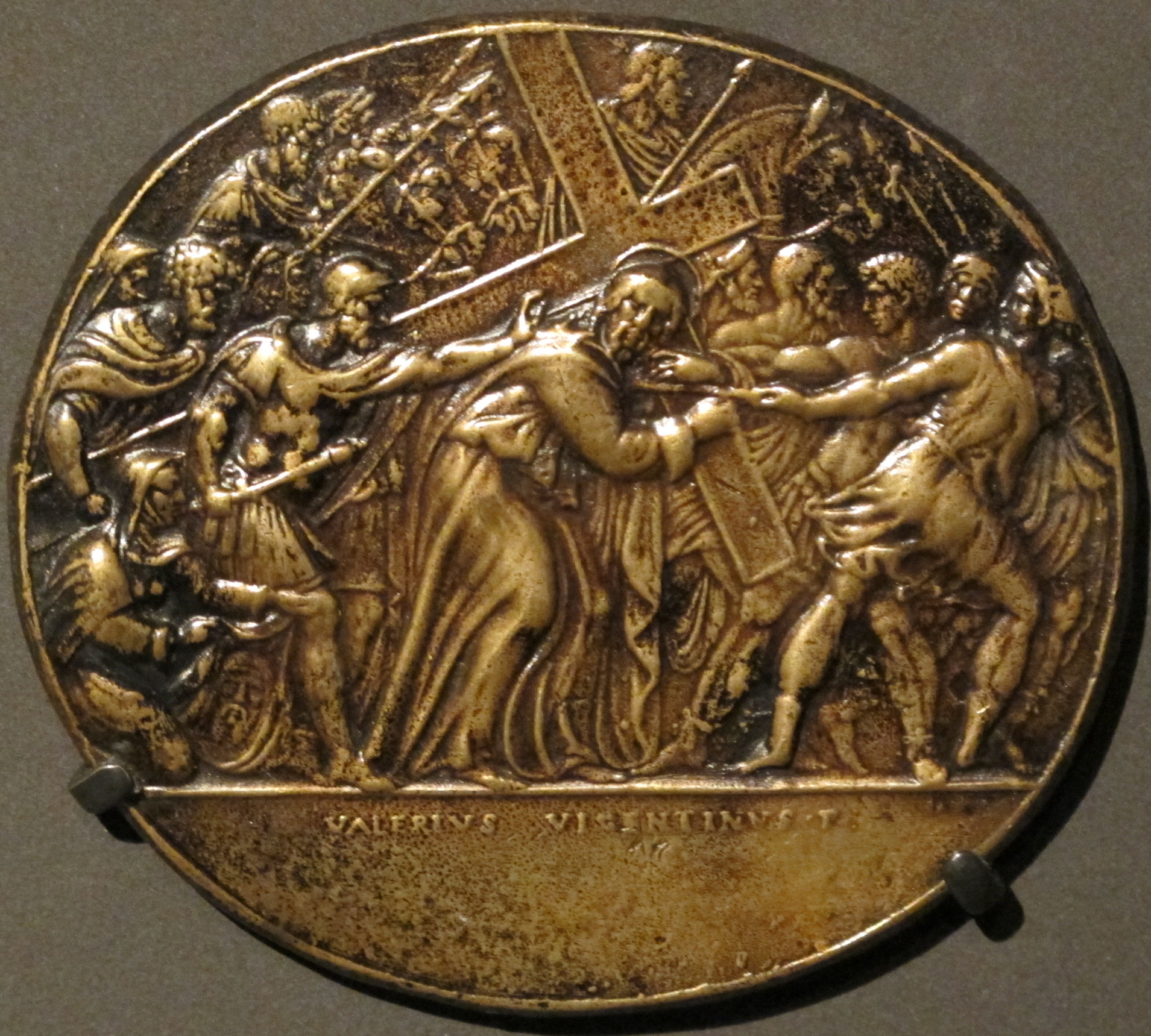
Plaquette by Valerio Belli, Christ Carrying the Cross, 1530–50

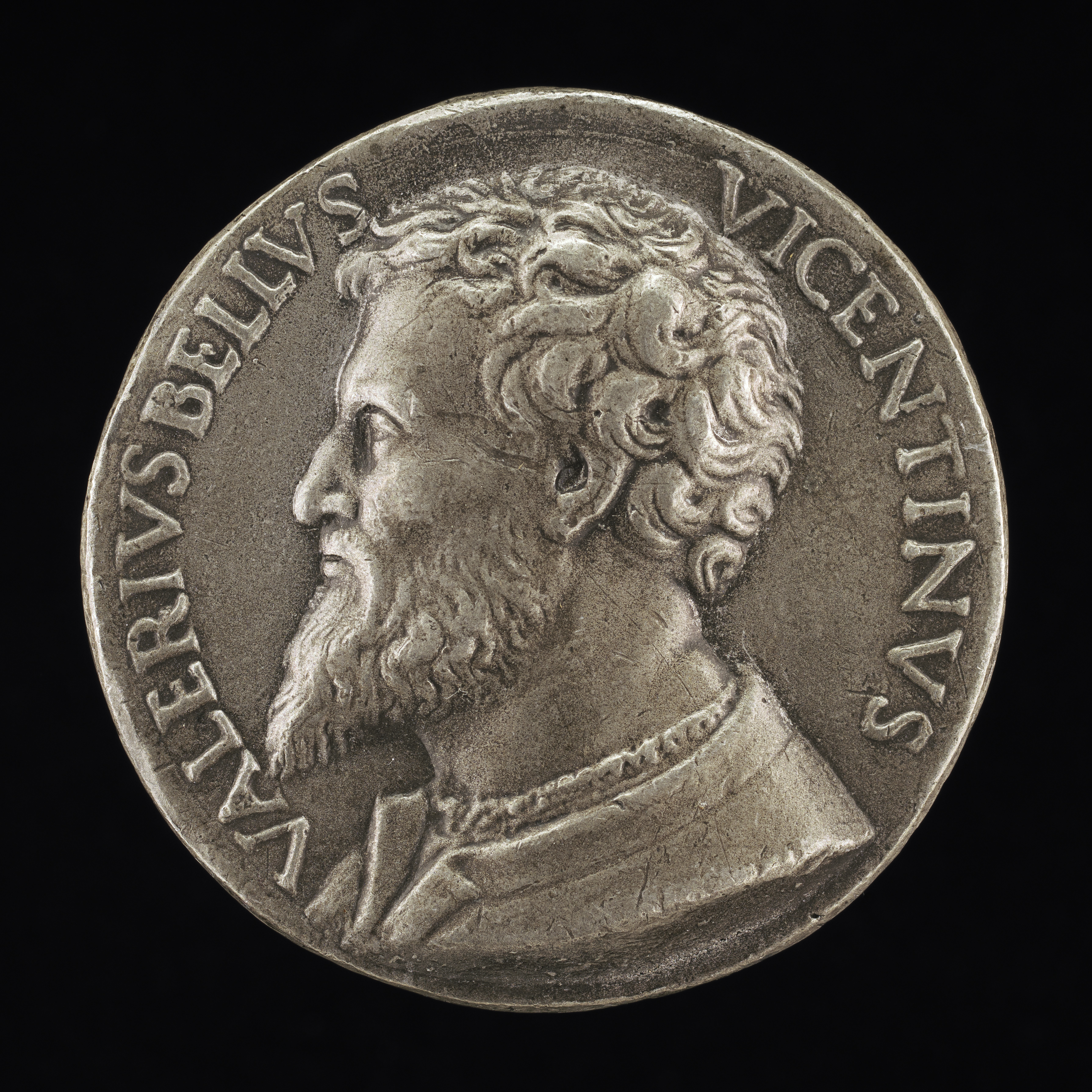
Self portrait medal

Valerio Belli (c. 1468–1546), also known as Valerio Vicentino, was a celebrated medallist, gem engraver, goldsmith, who with Giovanni Bernardi, who was twenty years younger, was the leading specialist in intaglios engraved in rock crystal, a difficult luxury form which Belli pioneered. These were highly sought after by wealthy Italian collectors. Though described as being "engraved", the intaglios are cut by drills, sometimes quite deeply, and developed their style from classical coins and engraved gems, to give "smoothly and eloquently orchestrated figural compositions". Castings of many of the crystal carvings were taken in wax and them used to make metal plaquettes, which Belli also designed and made de novo. He was described as a goldsmith, though no surviving works are known, and had some role at the Papal mint, though no coins are clearly attributable to him.

Born in Vicenza, he was also active in Rome, his most important period, and Venice before returning to his native city in later life. In metal he designed many portrait medals and plaquettes, including copies of his works in crystal. He was mentioned by the art historian Giorgio Vasari, and drawn by Parmigianino (now Museum Boijmans Van Beuningen). Another profile portrait bust in stone relief is in the Victoria and Albert Museum, and there is a similar self-portrait medal. A small round portrait, dated 1517 and formerly owned by Kenneth Clark (now in the Juan Abelló collection, Spain), may be by Raphael.

His most famous work is a casket, now in the Pitti Palace in Florence, commissioned by Pope Clement VII as a wedding present to the future King Henry II of France and Catherine de' Medici. This has 24 scenes from the Passion of Jesus in crystal.
