= Giovanni Bernardi =

Italian sculptor

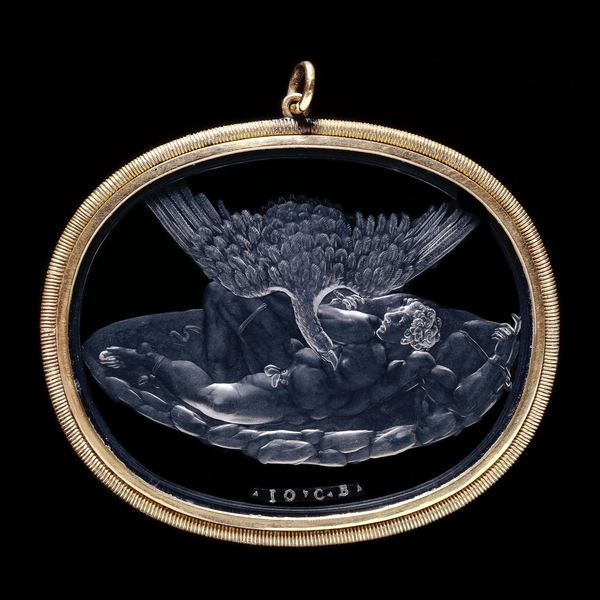
The Punishment of Tityos, rock crystal intaglio by Giovanni Bernardi, the British Museum

Giovanni Bernardi (1494 – 22 May 1553), also known as Giovanni da Castel Bolognese and as Giovanni da Castelbolognese, was an Italian gem engraver and medallist who was born in Castel Bolognese, Italy. He was the son of a goldsmith and by 1530 had moved to Rome, where he had a position in the Papal mint, which also allowed him time to work for other patrons. These included Cardinal Ippolito de' Medici (1511–35), Pope Clement VII (1523–34), Cardinal Alessandro Farnese, the future Pope Paul III, as well as his grandson, also called Cardinal Alessandro Farnese. He was "a skillful composer of elegant nudes in elaborate scenes".

Bernardi was best known for his intaglios engraved in rock crystal, which had been pioneered by Valerio Belli. This was a difficult luxury artform that was fashionable among wealthy Italian collectors. Though described as being "engraved", the intaglios are cut by drills, sometimes quite deeply. Castings of many of the crystal carvings were taken in wax and them used to make metal plaquettes, which Bernardi also designed and made de novo. He also made some versions in glass.

He died in Faenza, Italy in 1553.

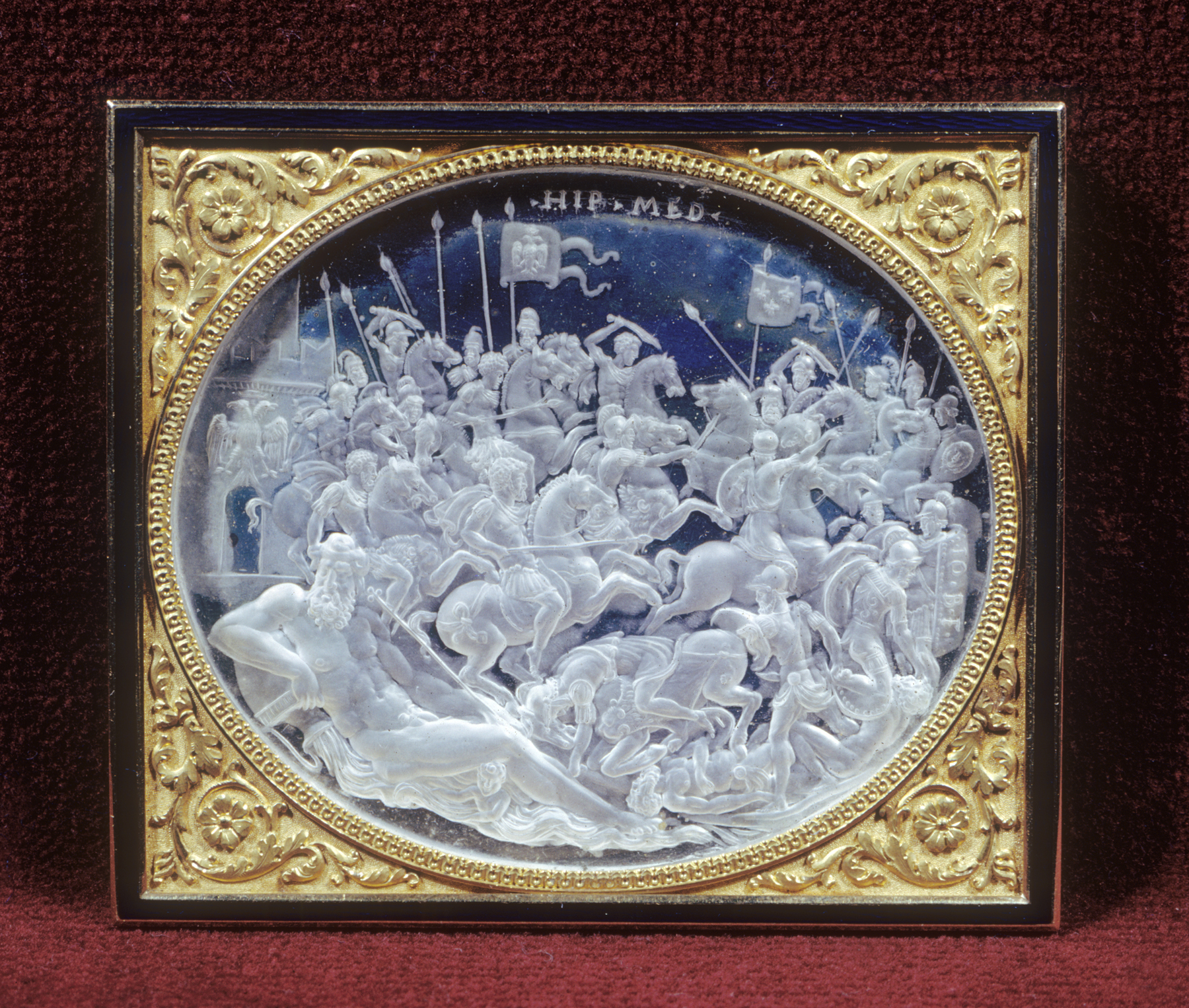
The Battle of Pavia in an engraved rock crystal cameo relief commissioned by Cardinal Ippolito de' Medici, c 1531-35 (Walters Art Museum)

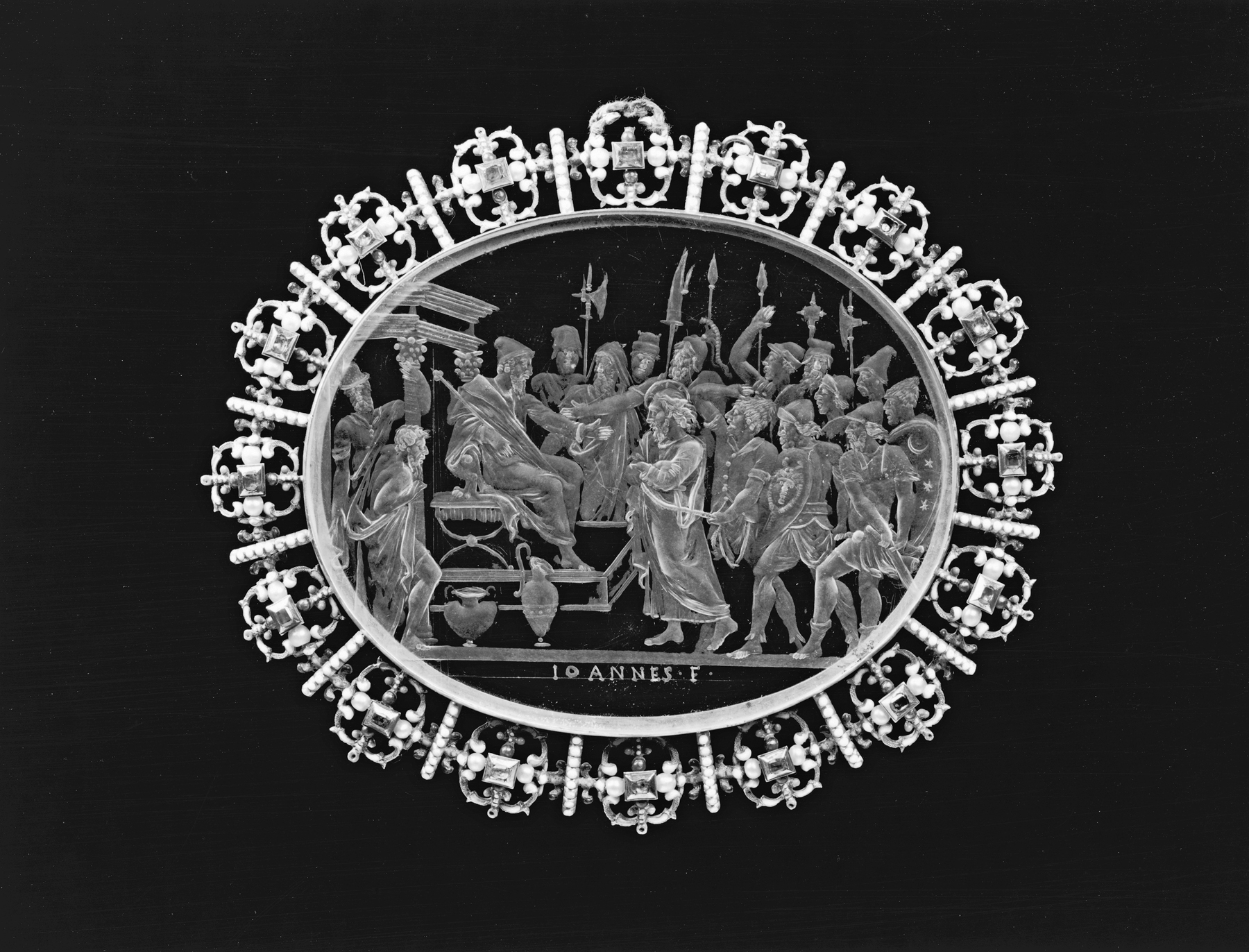
Christ before Pilate, perhaps from a set of engraved rock crystal plaques depicting the life of Christ that, according to Giorgio Vasari, Bernardi completed in 1547 for Cardinal Alessandro Farnese (Walters Art Museum)

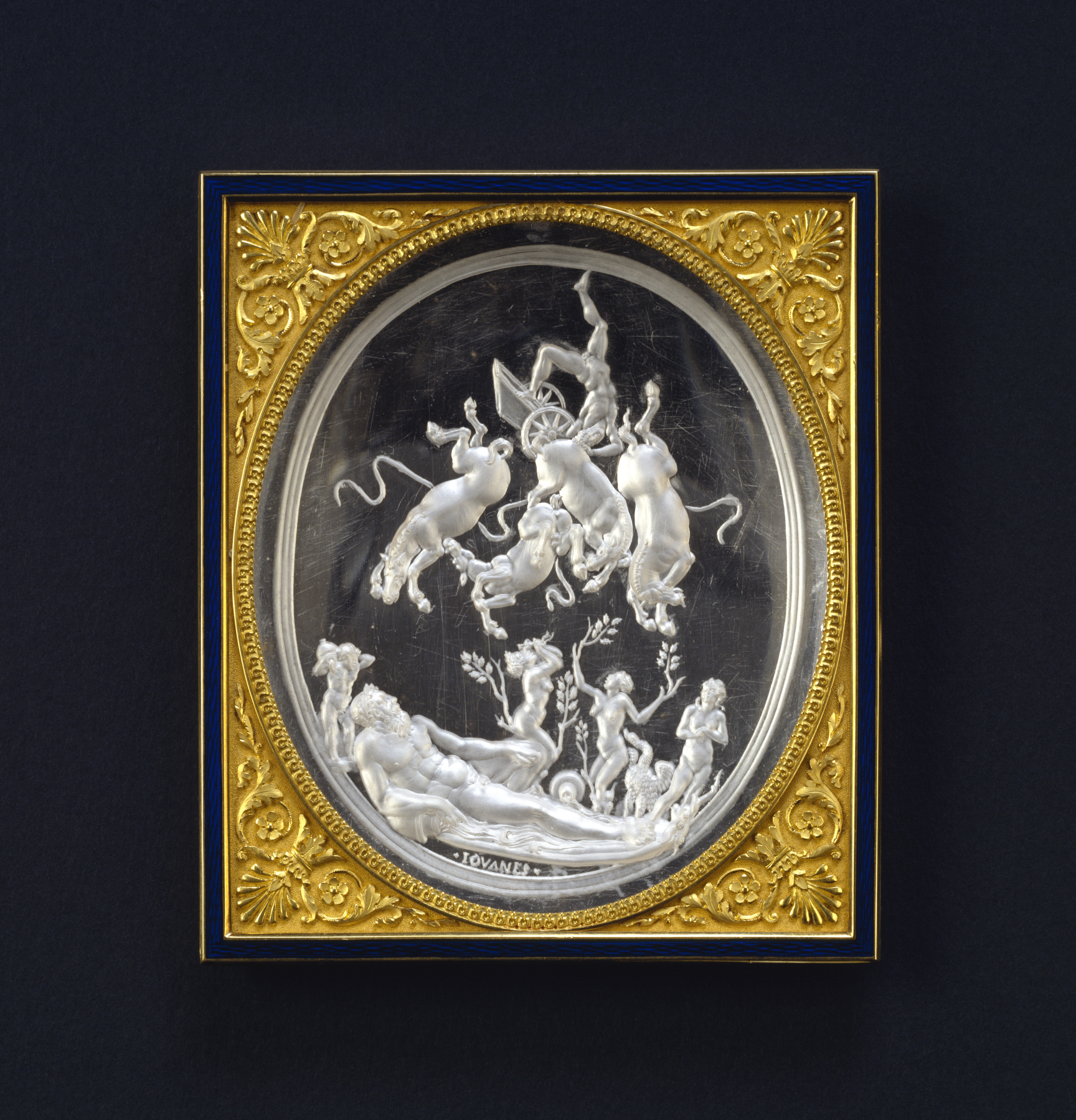
The Fall of Phaethon, after a design by Michelangelo, for Cardinal Ippolito de' Medici (Walters Art Museum)

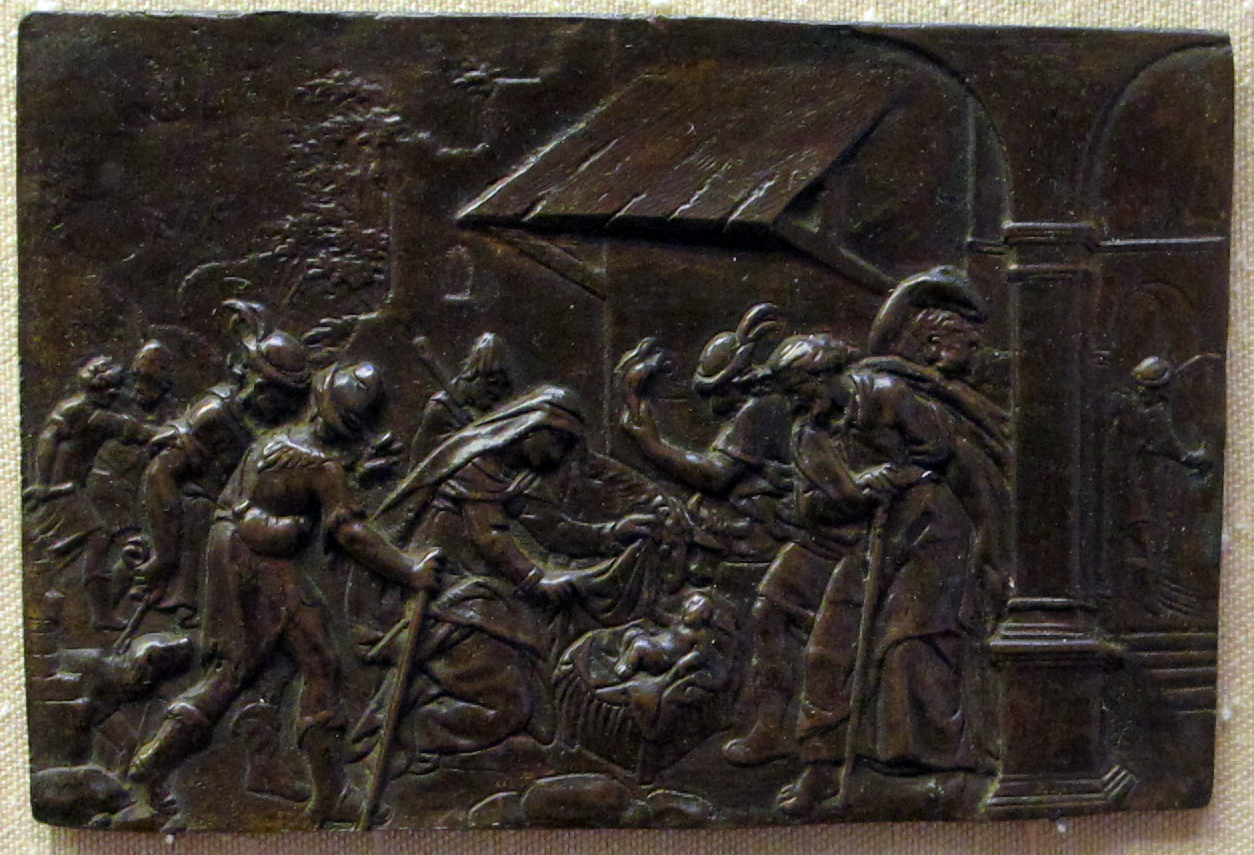
Plaquette with Adoration of the Shepherds
