= Royal Copenhagen 2010 plaquettes =

Series of Danish ceramic plaquettes plates

Royal Copenhagen 2010 plaquettes are a series of small, collectible round flat plaquettes produced by Danish factories, Aluminia and Royal Copenhagen. The numbered and named series of 3-1/4” (80 mm) faience miniplates or "plaquettes" are generally round, though a few are square. The most common colors are moderate to deep blue on a white background, though some have additional colors.

On the front, each has a scene depicting boats, landscapes, people, animals, steeples, buildings, statues, bridges, windmills, and more. Some also have a date on the outside edge. A variety of artists have provided the detailed artwork, including Kai Lange, Jørgen Nielsen, and Sven Vestergaard (1932-).

On the back, each plaquette has two pierced holes so the plaquettes can be hung for display. In addition to the number 2010, most (though not all) have an identification number, along with a description (usually in Danish, all capital letters) of the front scene. Some have the words “ROYAL COPENHAGEN DENMARK FAJENCE”, or just ‘DENMARK”. Some have the factory mark, three wavy lines one atop another. Some have a monogram. Some have the Royal Copenhagen modified beehive mark: a capital "A" representing the Aluminia factory with three wavy lines, representing Royal Copenhagen, as cross strokes. All plates manufactured after 1969 have a crown and the words "Royal Copenhagen Denmark".

The 2010 series is differentiated from the many other plaquettes by the number 2010 and item number on the back. Plaquettes without the 2010 number has also been produced, but the series with the 2010 number on the back are predominantly a series of tourist plaquettes with Danish sights. The plates were very popular as souvenirs or gifts for family abroad. The series includes a large selection of Danish castles and churches as well as other attractions.

Earl Nelson Newman wrote and privately printed a small hard-cover book in 1973 entitled "The Danish Royal Copenhagen Plaquettes: 2010 Series". This book contains pictures and descriptions of plates #1-#85, and the special series featuring American Presidents, zoo animals, and antique autos.

Because there was nearly no information/literatur about the "2010" Series, Carsten Pedersen (a collector himself) wrote a collector's catalogue in 2010. The catalogue describes about 448 miniplates (plaquettes) from the "2010" series and other series (old and new) from Royal Copenhagen, Aluminia, Köbenhavns Fajancefabrik and Bing & Gröndahl, Copenhagen. The catalogue was privately printed and entitled "Royal Copenhagen, Aluminia, Bing & Gröndahl - Plaquetten-Miniplates Series 2010 and special editions"
