= Peter Vischer the Elder =

German sculptor

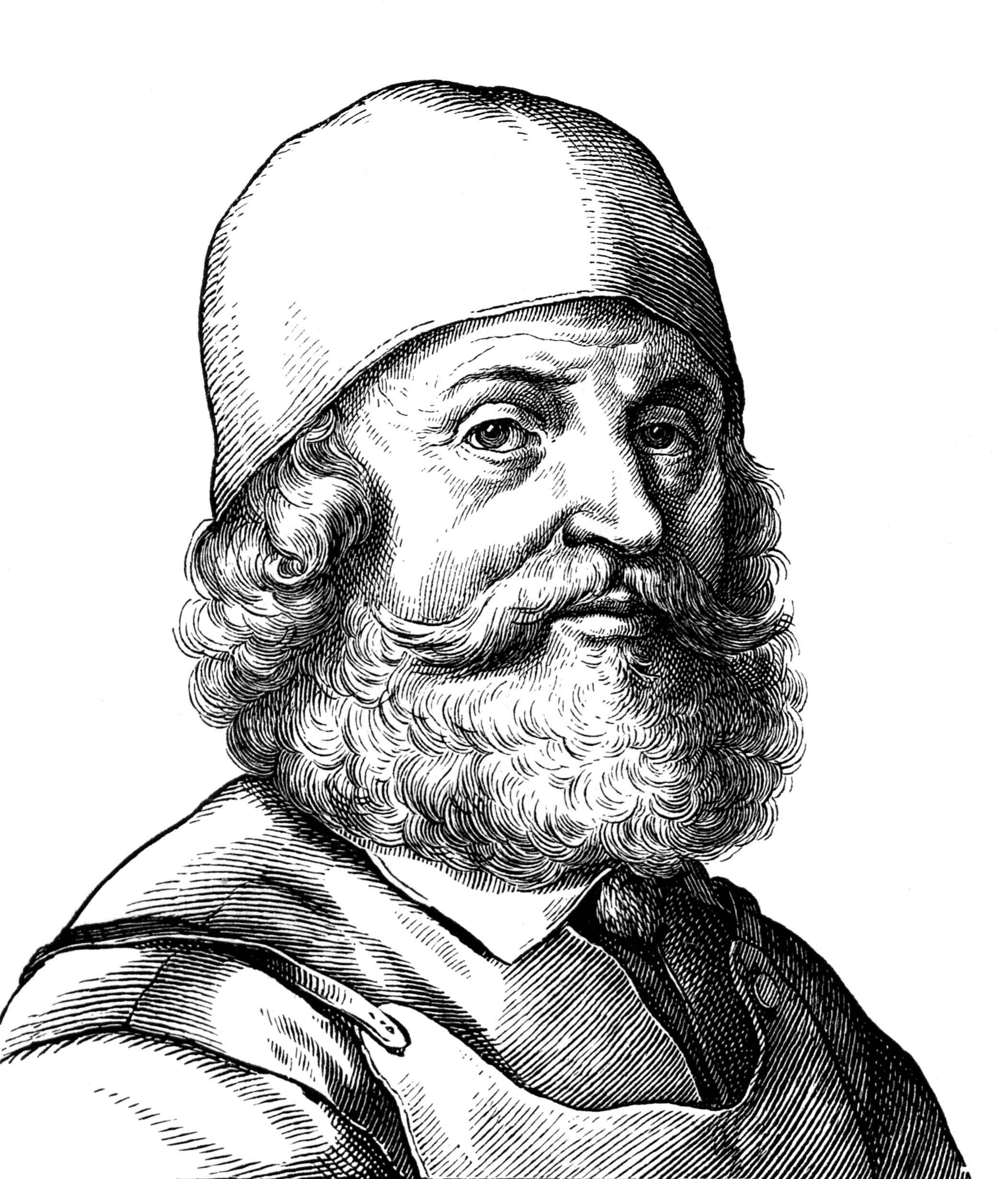
Peter Vischer the Elder

Peter Vischer the Elder (c. 1455 – January 7, 1529) was a German sculptor, the son of Hermann Vischer, and the most notable member of the Vischer Family of Nuremberg.

== Biography ==
Peter was born in Nuremberg, where he also died. He became "master" in 1489, and in 1494 was summoned by Philip, Elector Palatine to Heidelberg. He soon returned, however, to Nuremberg, where he worked with the help of his five sons, Hermann, Peter, Hans, Jakob and Paul.

== Works ==
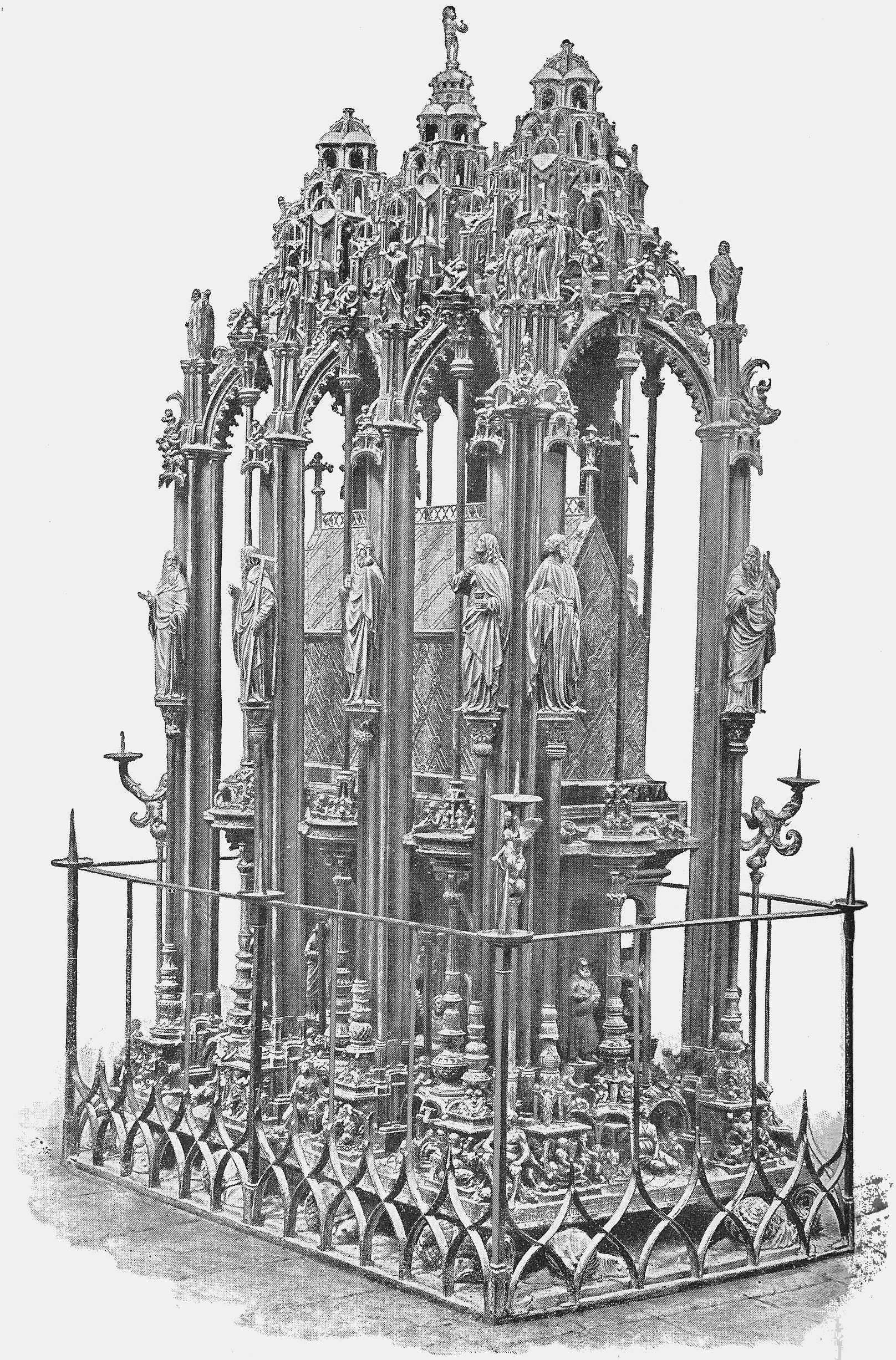
Monument of St. Sebaldus in the Sebalduskirche at Nuremberg, the masterpiece of Peter Vischer the Elder and his sons, begun 1508, completed 1519

- Tomb of Bishop Johannes IV., in the Breslau cathedral (1496)
- Tomb of Archbishop Ernest, in Magdeburg Cathedral (1495) His chief early work. It is surrounded with statuettes of the Apostles under semi-Gothic canopies. It is purer in style than the Shrine of Saint Sebald (see next item).
- Shrine of Saint Sebald located in the St. Sebaldus Church at Nuremberg (between 1508 and 1519): A tall canopied bronze structure, crowded with reliefs and statuettes in the most lavish way. The general form of the shrine is Gothic, but the details are those of the 16th-century Italian Renaissance. (This great work is really a canopied pedestal to support and enclose the shrine, not the shrine itself, which is a work of the 14th century, having the gabled form commonly used in the Middle Ages for metal reliquaries.) Some of the statuettes of saints attached to the slender columns of the canopy are modeled with much grace and even dignity of form. A small portrait figure of Peter himself, introduced at one end of the base, is a marvel of clever realism: he has represented himself as a stout, bearded man, wearing a large leathern apron and holding some of the tools of his craft. The shrine is a remarkable example of the uncommercial spirit which animated the artists of that time, and of the evident delight which they took in their work. Dragons, grotesques and little figures of boys, mixed with graceful scroll foliage, crowd every possible part of the canopy and its shafts, designed in the most free and unconventional way and executed with an utter disregard of the time and labor which were lavished on them.
- Large grille ordered by the Fugger brothers in Augsburg (lost)
- Relief of the "Crowning of the Blessed Virgin" in the Erfurt cathedral (a second example in the Wittenberg Schlosskirche, 1521)
- Tombstone for Margareta Tucherin in the Regensburg cathedral (1521)
- Tombstone for the Eisen family in the Ägidienkirche at Nuremberg (1522)
- Epitaph for the cardinal Albrecht of Brandenburg in the collegiate church at Aschaffenburg (1525)
- Epitaph of the duchess Helene of Mecklenburg in the cathedral at Schwerin

Besides these works there are a number of others ascribed to Peter the Elder with less certainty.

The two figures for the tomb of Maximilian I, Holy Roman Emperor by Peter Vischer (King Arthur & Theodoric the Great), at the Hofkirche, Innsbruck, begun in 1521, are perhaps the most meritorious German work of this class in the 16th century, and show considerable Italian influence. Arthur, and perhaps Theoderic too, was designed by Albrecht Dürer. Headlam believes that Peter Vischer the Younger is responsible for the Arthur and that Peter Vischer the Elder is responsible for Theoderic.

Peter Vischer the Elder is honored at the Walhalla Hall of Fame and Honor, which currently honors 191 German-speaking individuals of the last 1,800 years.

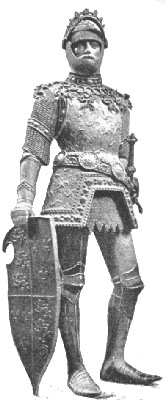
King Arthur by Peter Vischer the Elder

Theodoric, King of the Goths

== See also ==
- Vischer Family of Nuremberg
