= Vischer family of Nuremberg =

Family of Nuremberg artists

Vischer is the name of a family of sculptors active in Nuremberg between 1453 and 1549. The family contributed largely to the masterpieces of German art in the 15th and 16th centuries. Attribution between them can be confusing since they worked together out of the same workshop. The fame of Peter Vischer the Elder seems to have caused the tendency of over attribution to him versus his sons and even non-family members.

== Hermann Vischer the Elder ==
Hermann Vischer, the Elder came to Nuremberg as a worker in brass in 1453 and there became a "master" of his guild. There is only one work that can be ascribed to him with certainty, the baptismal font in the parish church of Wittenberg (1457). This is decorated with figures of the Apostles. He died in 1487.

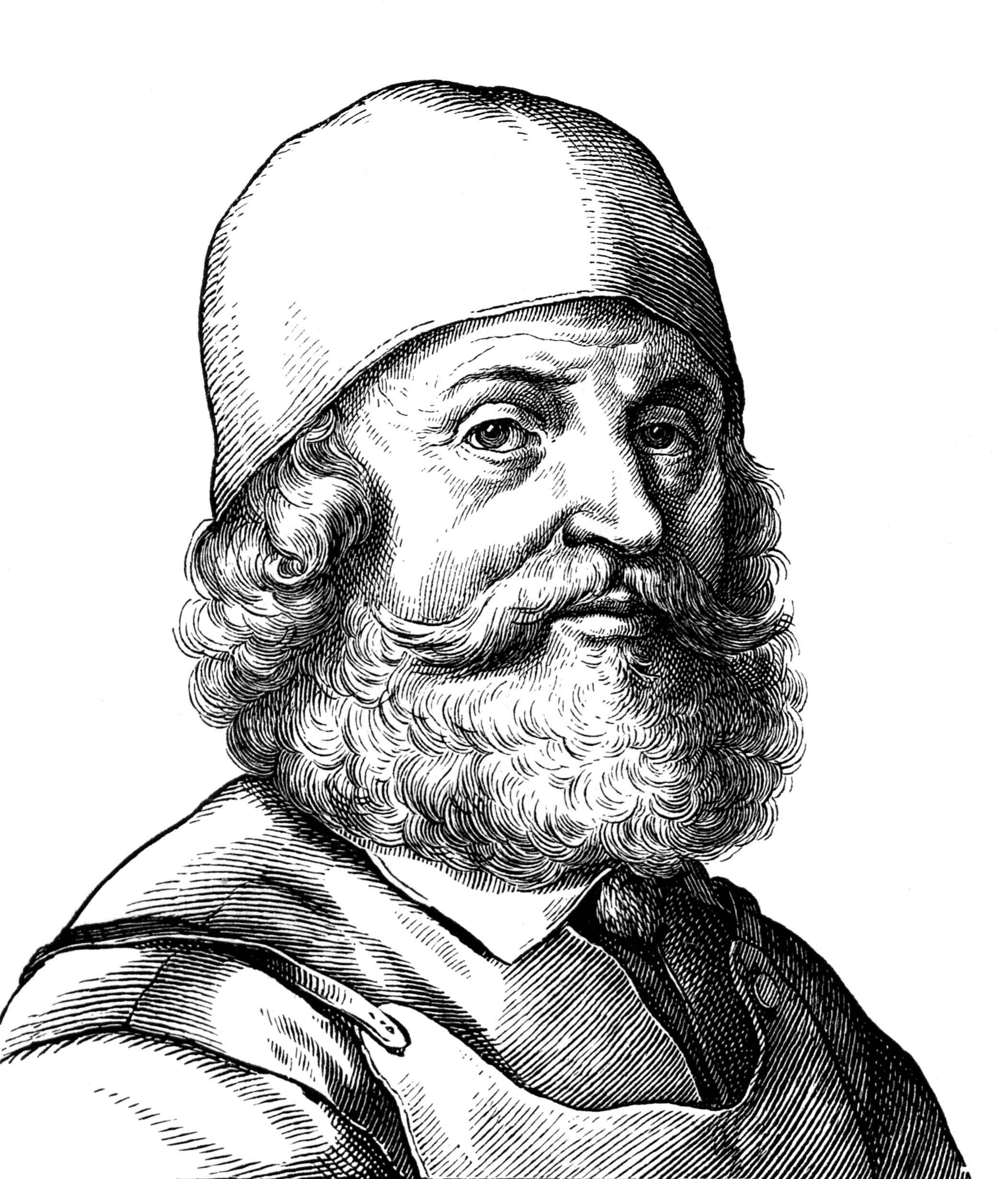
Peter Vischer the Elder

== Peter Vischer the Elder ==
Hermann's son, Peter Vischer the Elder (c.1455 –7 January 1529), is the best known member of the family. He worked with the help of his five sons, Hermann, Peter, Hans, Paul.

== Hermann Vischer the Younger ==
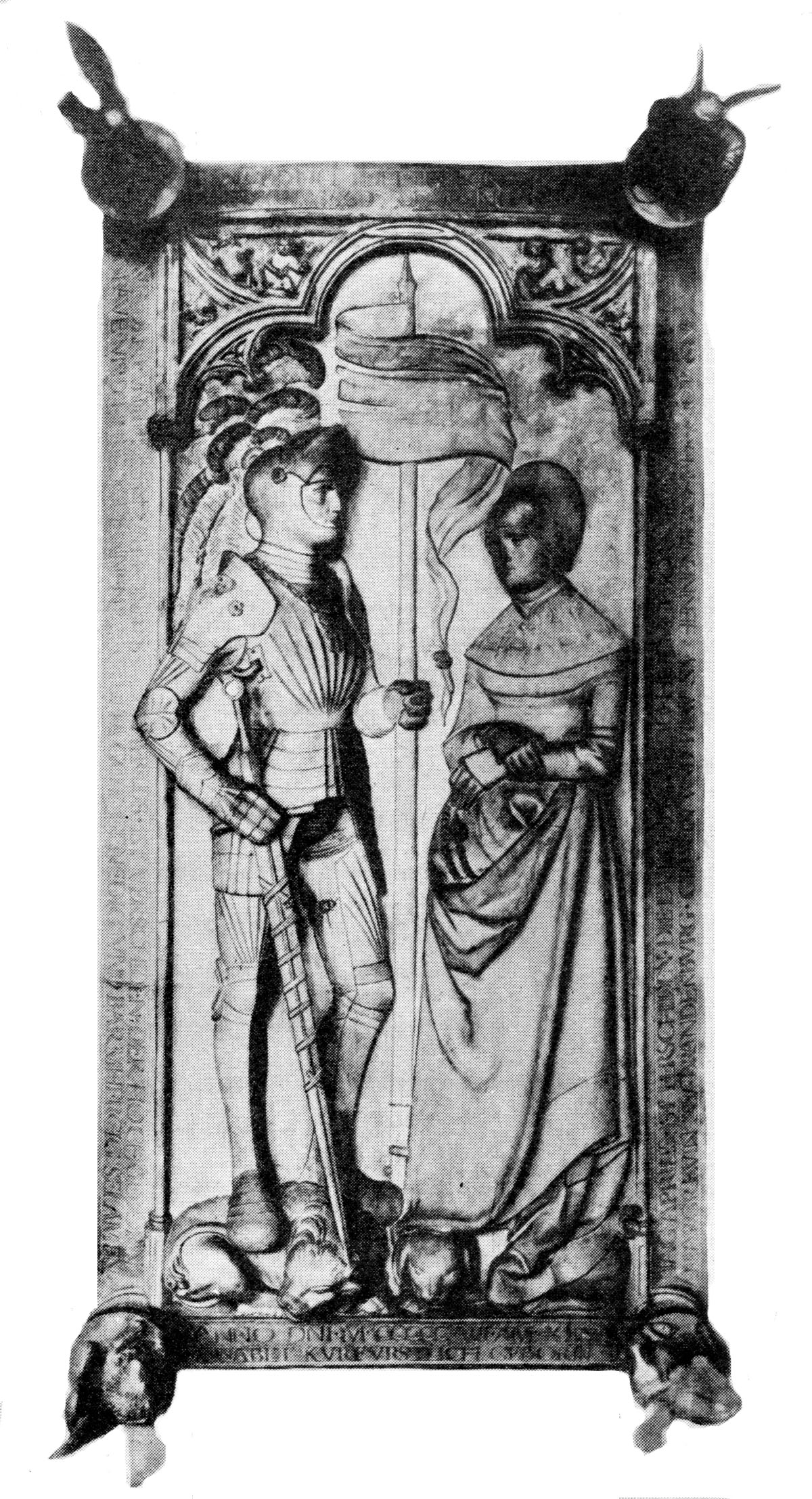
Tomb of Count Hermann VIII of Henneberg and wife Elizabeth of Brandenburg

Hermann Vischer, the Younger (c.1486–1 January 1517) was the son of Peter Vischer the Elder. The tomb of Elisabeth and Hermann VIII of Henneberg in the Stadtkirche of Römhild is sometimes attributed to Hermann and other times to the workshop in general.

Tomb of Frederick the Wise

Nuremberg Madonna attributed to Peter Vischer the Younger

== Peter Vischer the Younger ==
Peter Vischer the Younger (1487–1528) was another son of Peter Vischer the Elder. Initially less well known, he has come to be seen as the equal in quality of his father with whom he worked. The tomb of the electoral prince Frederick the Wise in the Schlosskirche at Wittenberg (1521), previously thought to be by the Elder, is now thought to be by the Younger.

The origin of the Nuremberg Madonna is disputed, and may not be Vischer's work at all.

== Hans Vischer ==
Hans Vischer (1486–1546) was the son of Peter Vischer the Elder. Hans was thought to be an excellent craftsman but a less talented artist. He built the tomb of John the Steadfast in the Schlosskirche at Wittenberg. Brother Peter the Younger had done the tomb of John's brother Frederick the Wise at the same church. Upon the death of Peter the Elder in 1529 (Peter the Younger and Hermann had already died), the business was inherited by Peter's son Paul. He immediately sold it to his brother Hans, who completed the works in progress by his father. This included the bronze grave plate for Prince-Bishop Lorenz von Bibra of Würzburg. In 1549, Hans left Nuremberg closing the chapter on the Vischers of Nuremberg.
