= Madonna and Child with Saint John the Baptist and Saint Francis =

1489 painting by Cima da Conegliano

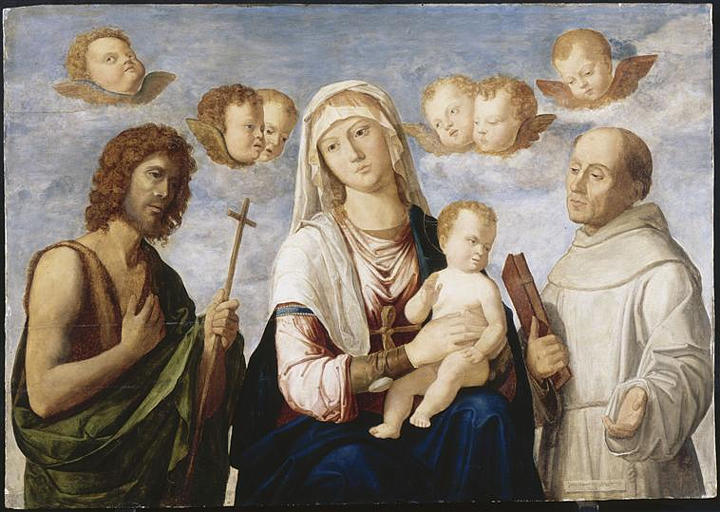
Madonna and Child with Saint John the Baptist and Saint Francis (1489) by Cima da Conegliano

Madonna and Child with Saint John the Baptist and Saint Francis is a 1489 oil-on-panel painting by the Italian Renaissance artist Cima da Conegliano, now in the Musée du Petit Palais in Avignon.
