= San Giovanni Fuoricivitas =

Romanesque religious church and adjacent buildings in Pistoia, Tuscany, Italy

Coordinates: 43°55′54.91″N 10°54′59″E

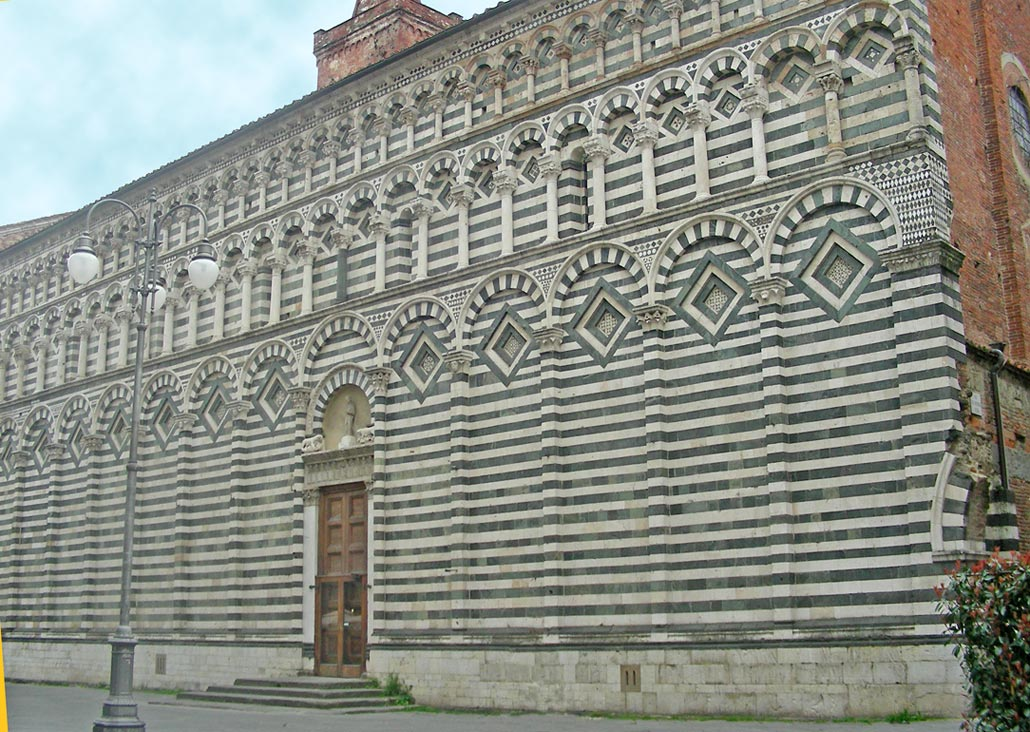
Side view of the church.

San Giovanni Fuoricivitas (also called San Giovanni Evangelista Fuorcivitas or Forcivitas) is a Romanesque religious church and adjacent buildings in Pistoia, Tuscany, central Italy. The adjective fuoricivitas (a mix of Italian and Latin meaning "outside the city") refers to it location, outside of the first set of city walls, when it was founded during the era of Lombard rule in Italy.

== History ==
No traces remain of the original Lombard edifice. The first document mentioning the church dates to 1119, when the church was described by Bishop Ildebrand as "nearly in ruins". In his Guide to Pistoia, the author Tolomei cites references to this church as a priory in either 12th or 13th century. Others mention it was likely a collegiate church before that time. The current building was most likely begun soon afterward, erected in the typical orientation with apse to the west. Construction lasted until 1344.

The church was severely damaged by the Allied bombings during World War II, and has undergone meticulous restoration during 1960 through the 1990s.

== Description ==
=== Exterior and cloister ===
The appearance of the edifice is mostly defined by its northern side, originally parallel to now disappeared walls. The southern side faces the cloister, while the apse side and the façade are barely visible due to nearby structures. The northern flank has most of the external decorations, including a rich portal with a sculpted architrave depicting the Last Supper, signed and dated (1166) by the master Gruamonte. this sculptor also completed a portal in the church of Sant'Andrea. The pattern of the wall is typical of other buildings in Pistoia, and inspired by the contemporary Pisan Romanesque: it features rows of small arcades on small or blind columns with small windows and lozenges inscribed within the arches. The stones used, white and green in color, are respectively marble and serpentine from Prato.

During the last medieval enlargement, the church received its current plan with a single hall and a rectangular apse, incorporating the former northern wing of the cloister. What remains of the latter, dating to the 12th century, is today the only example in Pistoia of a Romanesque structure in mixed stone and brickwork construction. The small columns are in stone, decorated with capitals featuring heads of lions and oxen, while the arches and the walls are in brickwork. In the 14th century it received a second floor with a loggia.

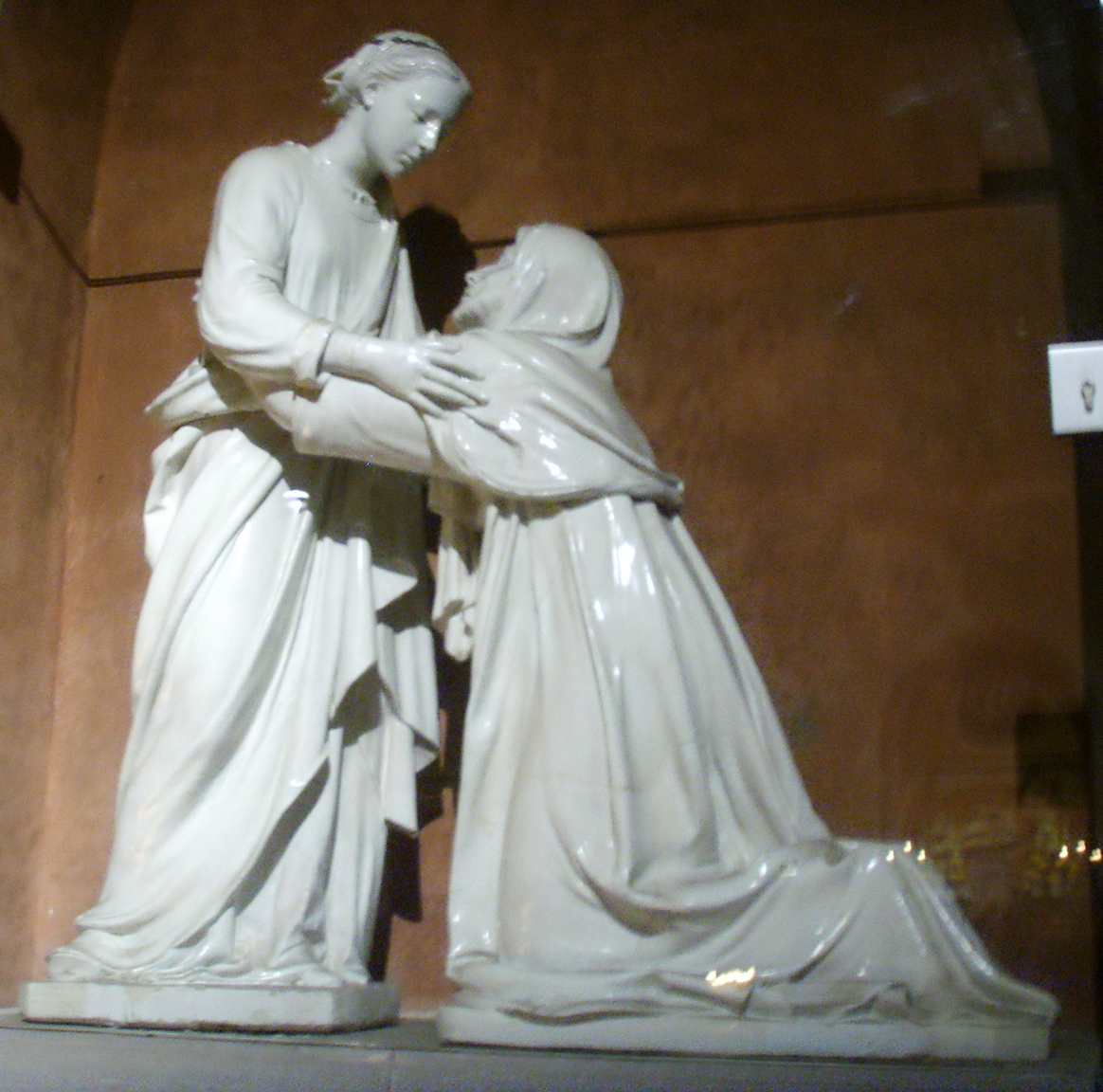
Luca della Robbia's Visitation, Commissioned by the Fioravanti family 1445

=== Interior ===
Left of the entrance, on the northern wall, is a white ceramic glaze depicting the Visitation, by Luca della Robbia. It is the oldest surviving example of the use of this technique in his workshop, aside from friezes or bas-reliefs. The work, originally featuring gilded decorations on the hair and the clothes, was commissioned in 1445 by the Fioravanti family of Pistoia. It was probably located then on the side opposite its present one.

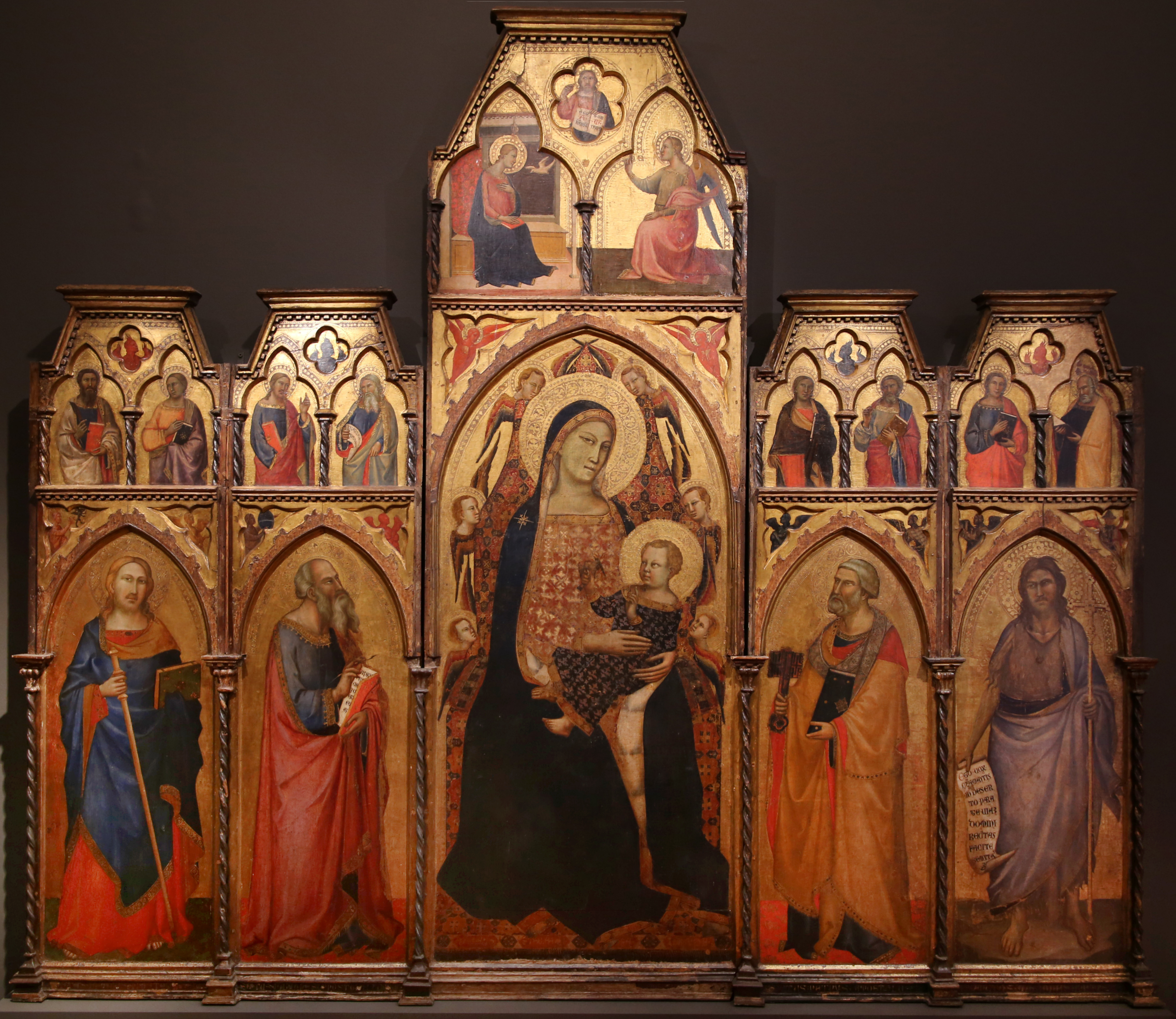
Taddeo Gaddi's polyptych, ca. 1350–53

The holy water font in the middle of the nave is from the 12th-13th century, attributed (in the upper part) to Giovanni Pisano. It depicts the Cardinal virtues, supported by caryatids of the three Theological virtues, and is attributed to a pupil of Nicola Pisano.

On the southern walls is the ambon, sculpted by Fra Guglielmo da Pisa, but also thought to have been a collaboration completed along with Arnolfo di Cambio. Executed and signed in 1270, it was initially located in the Romanesque presbytery, and moved to its present position in 1778. The high-relief sculptures in Apuan marble originally had a polychrome glass background, now mostly lost. At the steps of the columns are sculptures of lions.

In the presbytery is a polyptych by Taddeo Gaddi (1350–1353) depicting the Virgin and Child with Saints James, John the Evangelist, Peter and John the Baptist. Above the main figures, inscribed within Gothic-style small arches and twisted columns, are other figures of saints; in the upper frame is an Annunciation within a mullioned window, surmounted by the Eternal Father.

The frescoes in the choir are from 1307, with scenes of the story of the Passion, attributed to the Master of 1310. The church houses also a 13th-century crucifix.

== Sources ==
- Ferrali, S. (1970). "S. Giovanni Fuorcivitas". Il patrimonio artistico di Pistoia e del suo territorio: Catalogo storico descrittivo. Pistoia.
