= Musée du Petit Palais, Avignon =

Museum and art gallery in Avignon, southern France

Coordinates: 43°57′9.5″N 4°48′23″E

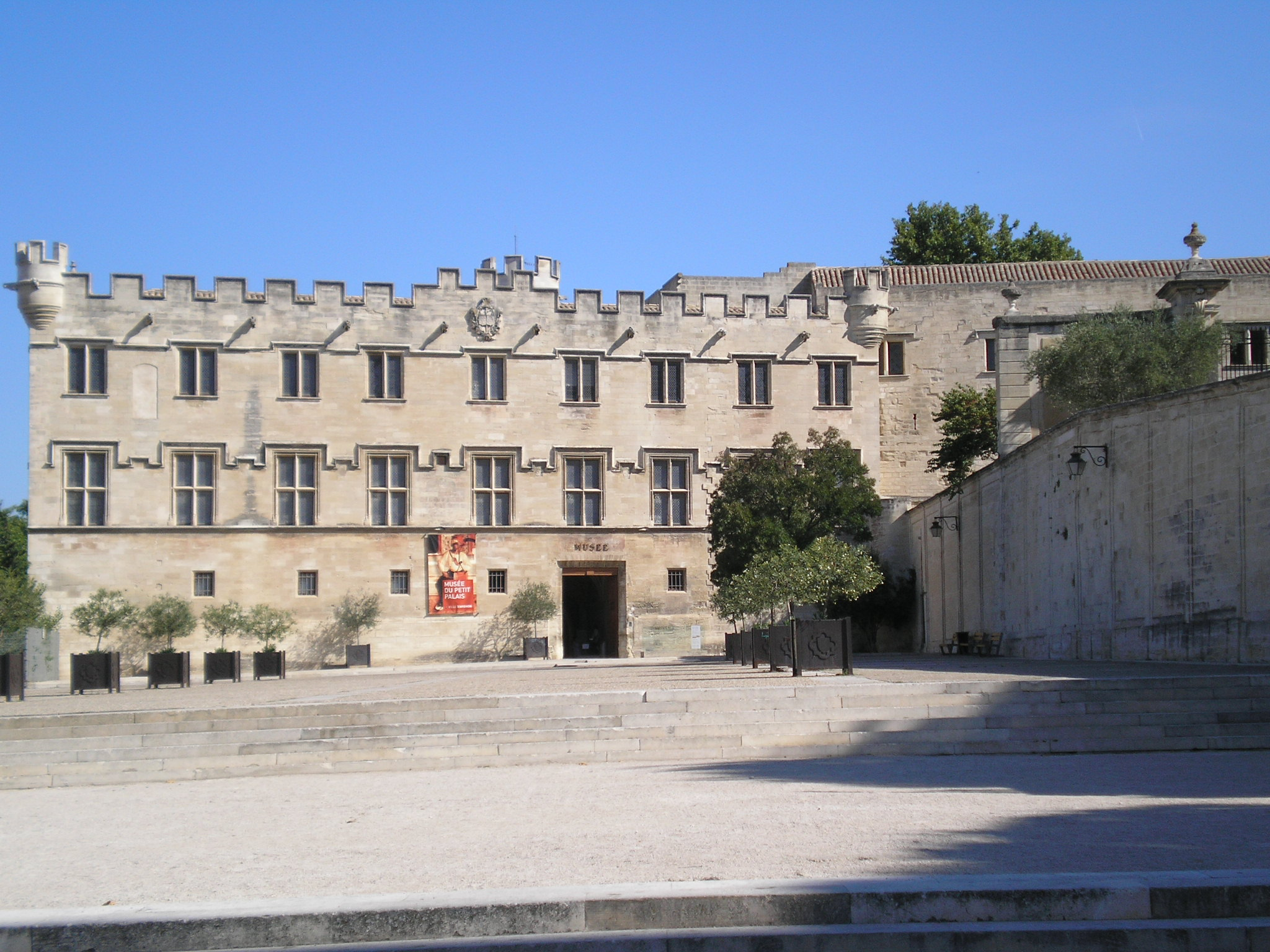
Musée du Petit Palais in Avignon

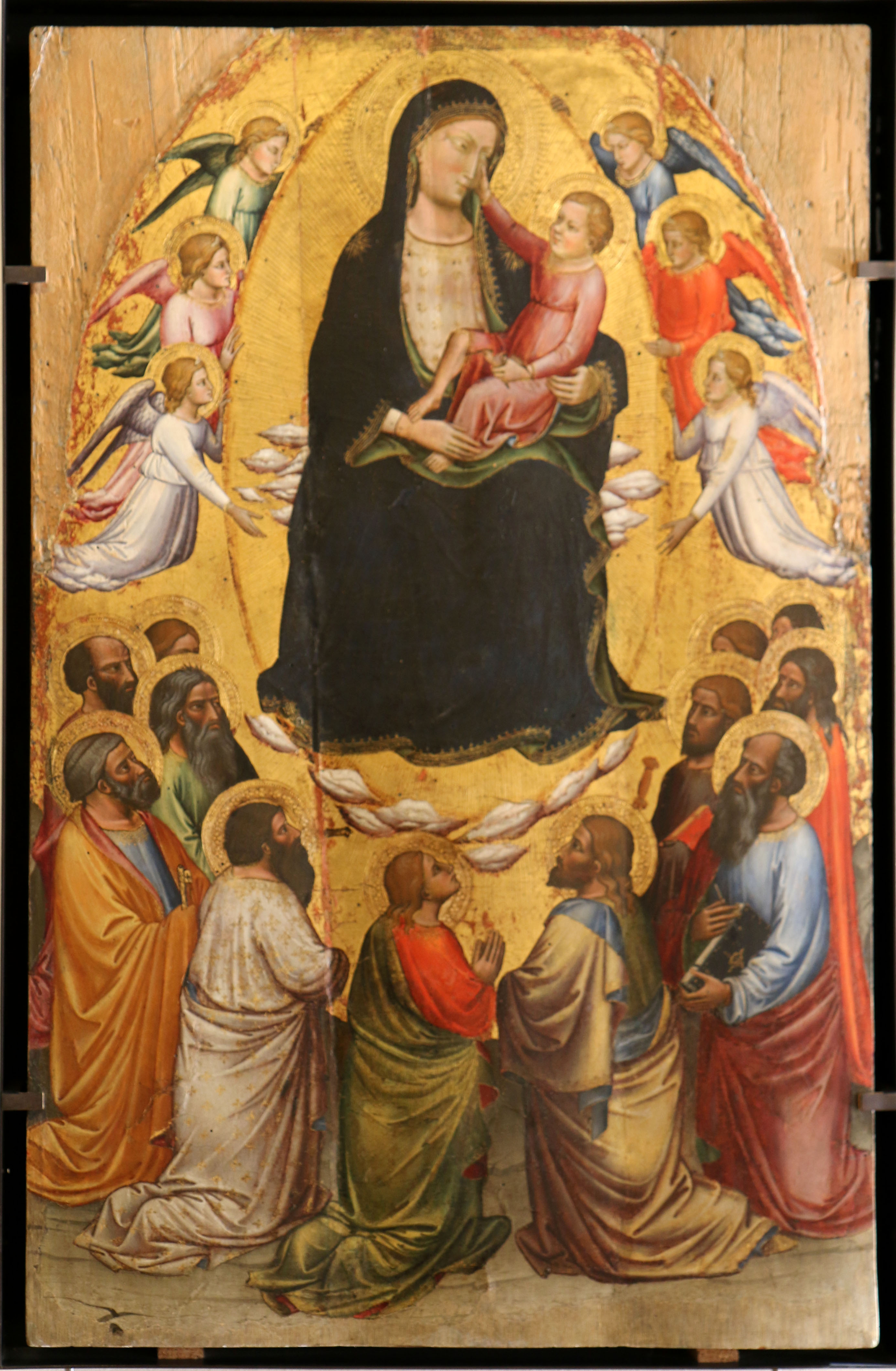
The Virgin in glory with the Apostles, by Mariotto di Nardo

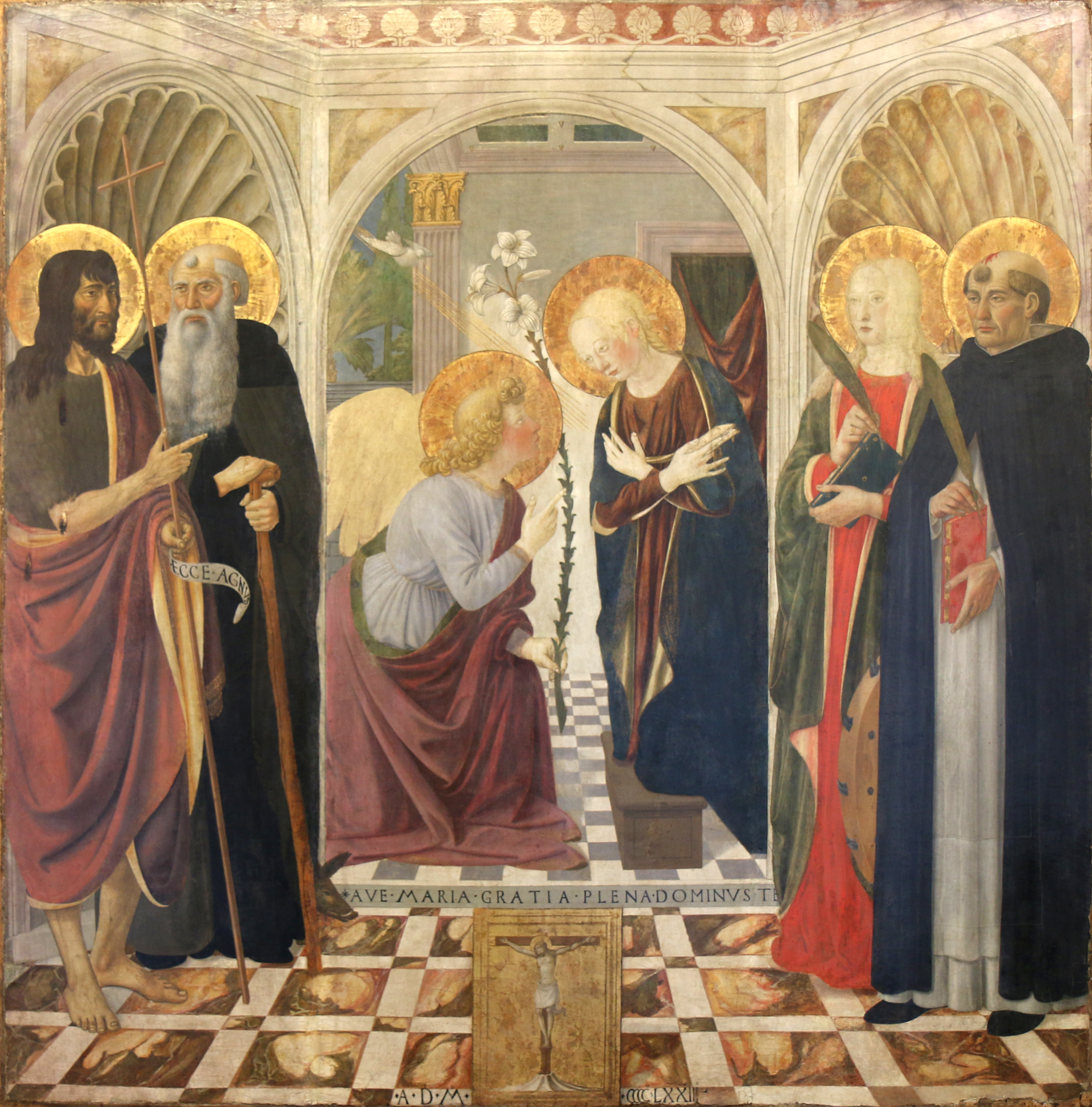
The Annunciation, by Cosimo Rosselli

The Musée du Petit Palais (Occitan: Museu dels Pichon Palai) is a museum and art gallery in Avignon, southern France. It opened in 1976 and has an exceptional collection of "primitives" and early Renaissance paintings from Italy, which reunites those of the collection of Giampietro Campana deposed by the Musée du Louvre as well as paintings of the Avignon school deposed by the Musée Calvet. It is housed in a 14th-century building at the north side of the square overlooked by the Palais des Papes. The building, built in the early 14th century as the residence of the bishops of Avignon, was made a UNESCO World Heritage Site as part of the historic center of Avignon in 1995.

== Building ==
Named Petit Palais to distinguish it from the Palais des Papes, the original structure was built during the period of the Avignon Papacy by Cardinal Berengar Fredol the Elder around 1318–20. The palace and a few neighbouring buildings were bought on de Frédol's death in 1323 by Cardinal Arnaud de Via, nephew of the reigning Pope John XXII. When de Via died in 1335, Pope Benedict XII bought the building for use as the episcopal palace. The subsequent building work created an interior close to that of the present configuration with four wings around a cloister and a service court.

The building suffered during its use from 1396 as a fortified citadel during the Western Schism, and was a wreck by the time the war ended in 1411. In the second half of the 15th century, Bishop Alain de Coëtivy and his successor, Giuliano della Rovere (the future Pope Julius II) carried out restoration work, giving the Palace more or less its present appearance by 1503. Della Rovere arrived in Avignon in 1474, having been made bishop of Avignon and papal legate of Avignon by his uncle Pope Sixtus IV. He added new south and west facades in Italian Renaissance style (with oculi, a west-facing door surmounted with a triangular pediment, window drip-moldings and his insignia facing south) and, in 1487, a tower (which collapsed in 1767). The Palace became known as the Palace of the Archbishop when the city was promoted to an archbishopric soon after della Rovere took office.

During the French Revolution, the palace was nationalised and sold off, becoming a Catholic secondary school in 1826 and then in 1904, with the separation of the church and the state, a professional and technical school. The building was listed as a historic monument in 1910. The restoration work, began in 1961, was supervised by Jean Sonnier, the chief architect of the Monument historique, the national heritage organization in France. The building opened as a museum in 1976.

== Collection ==
- 390 works by Italian (327 by 130 artists) and French primitive or early-Renaissance painters such as Sandro Botticelli (Madonna with Child, c. 1467) or Vittore Carpaccio.
- 600 sculptures including the effigy head from the tomb of Antipope Clement VII; the rest of the tomb was destroyed during the French Revolution.

=== Paintings ===
==== 13th and 14th centuries ====
Simone Martini, Paolo Veneziano, Lippo Memmi, Taddeo Gaddi, Agnolo Gaddi (The Calvary), Ambrogio Lorenzetti, Bartolo di Fredi, Giovanni Baronzio, Lorenzo di Bicci, Master of 1310, Jacopo del Casentino, Mariotto di Nardo, Jacopo di Cione, Puccio di Simone, Paolo di Giovanni Fei, Turino Vanni, Barnaba da Modena (workshop), Simone dei Crocifissi, Angelo Puccinelli, Girolamo Marchesi, Niccolo di Pietro Gerini, Niccolò di Tommaso, Francescuccio Ghissi.

==== 15th and 16th centuries ====
Sandro Botticelli (Madonna with Child), Vittore Carpaccio (Sacred conversation), Lorenzo Monaco, Carlo Crivelli, Vittorio Crivelli, Sano di Pietro, Matteo di Giovanni, Benvenuto di Giovanni, Taddeo di Bartolo, Andrea di Bartolo, Benozzo Gozzoli, Lorenzo di Credi (workshop), Antonio Vivarini, Bartolomeo Vivarini, Liberale da Verona, Pesellino, Jacopo del Sellaio, Neri di Bicci, Cima da Conegliano, Vecchietta, Giovanni di Paolo, Jacopo di Paolo, Cosimo Rosselli, Ludovico Mazzolino, Ridolfo del Ghirlandaio, Giovanni da Udine, Biagio di Antonio Tucci, Benvenuto di Giovanni, Bartolomeo Veneto, Ambrogio Bergognone, Francesco Botticini, Antoniazzo Romano, Bonifacio Bembo, Marco Palmezzano, Bernardino Fungai, Master of Tavarnelle, Louis Bréa or from the Avignon school Josse Lieferinxe and Enguerrand Quarton.

=== Sculptures ===
The collection features Romanesque sculpted capitals from the churches of Avignon notably from the cloister of the Cathédrale Notre-Dame des Doms (12th c.), pieces of funerary monuments of the papal period (14th c.) like those of John XXII, Innocent VI, Urban V or the cardinals Philippe de Cabassole and Jean de La Grange (1388-–89), as well as sculptures of the school of Avignon (15th c.) with Antoine Le Moiturier or Jean de la Huerta.

Italian paintings

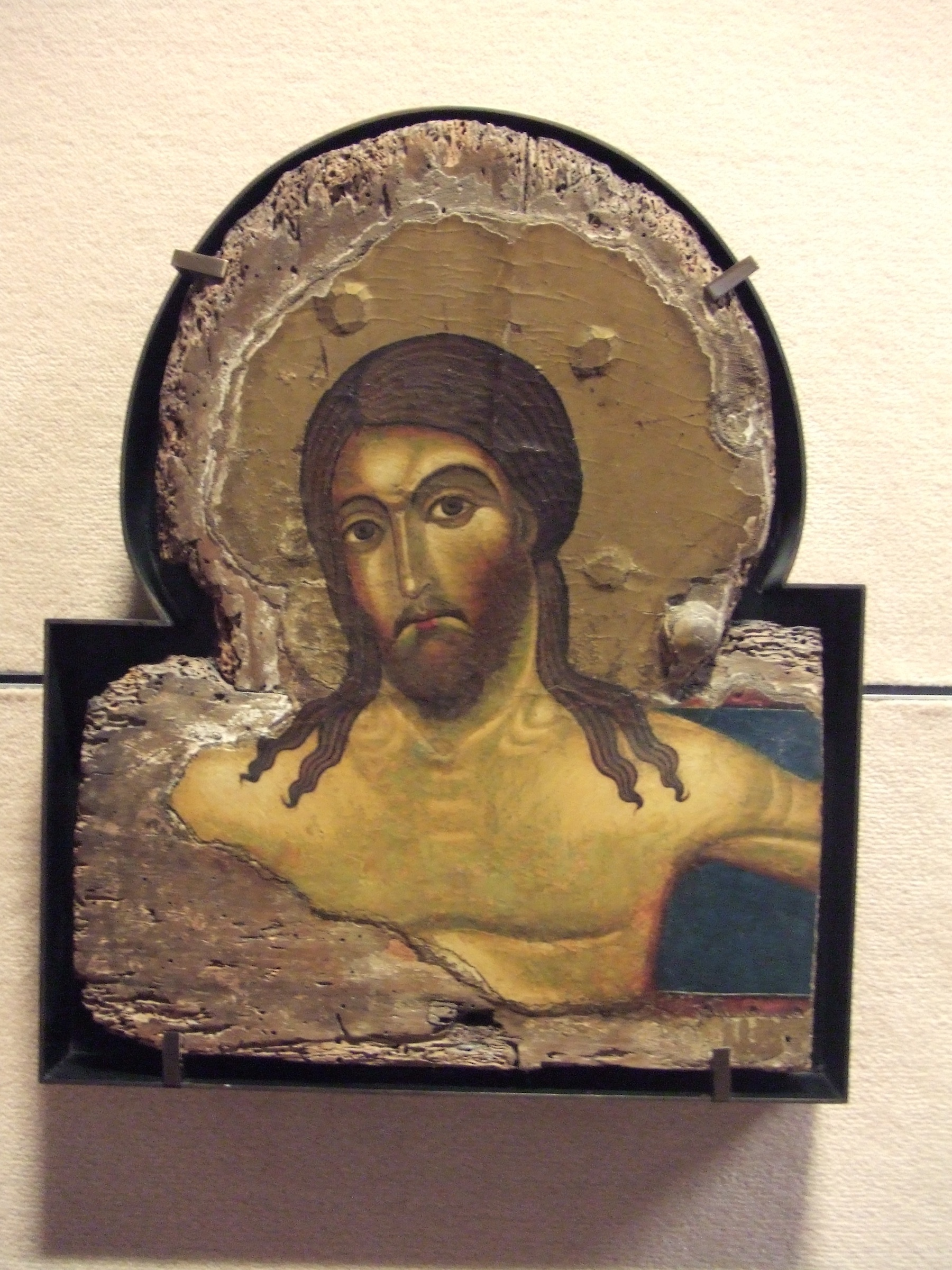
Head of a Crucifix or Christ Berlinghieri.

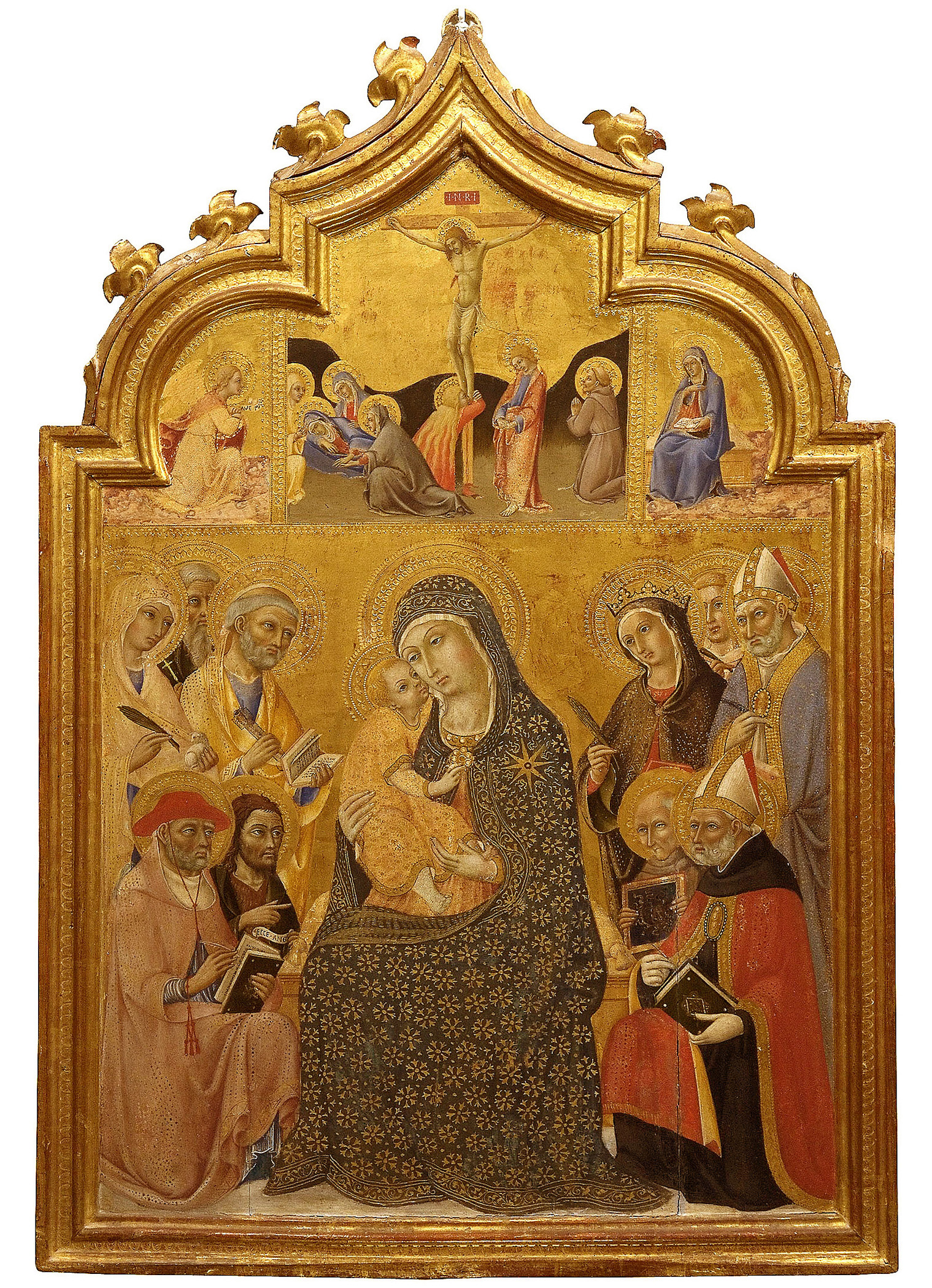
Simone Martini, Madonna with Child (c. 1320).

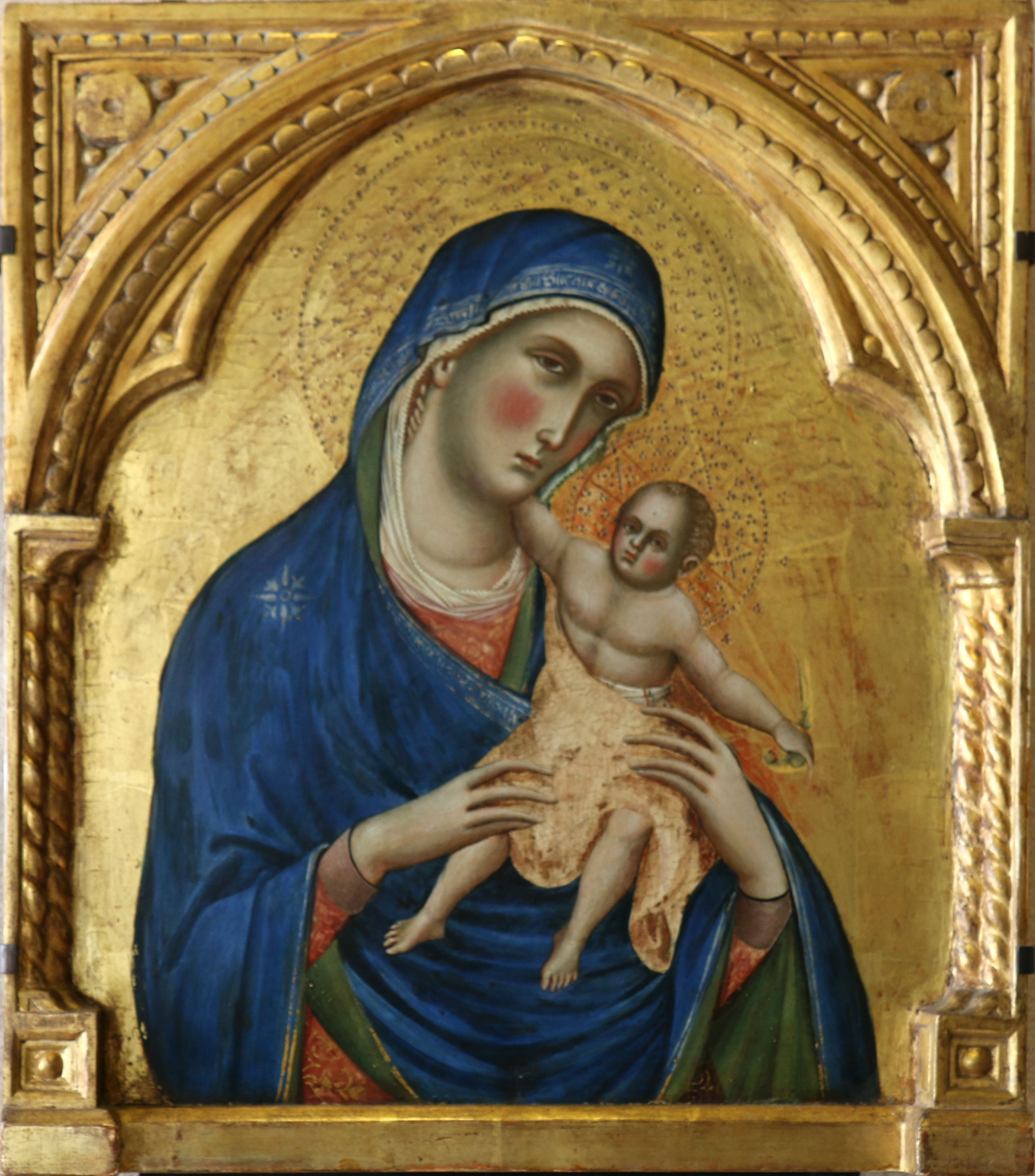
Paolo Veneziano, Madonna with Child.

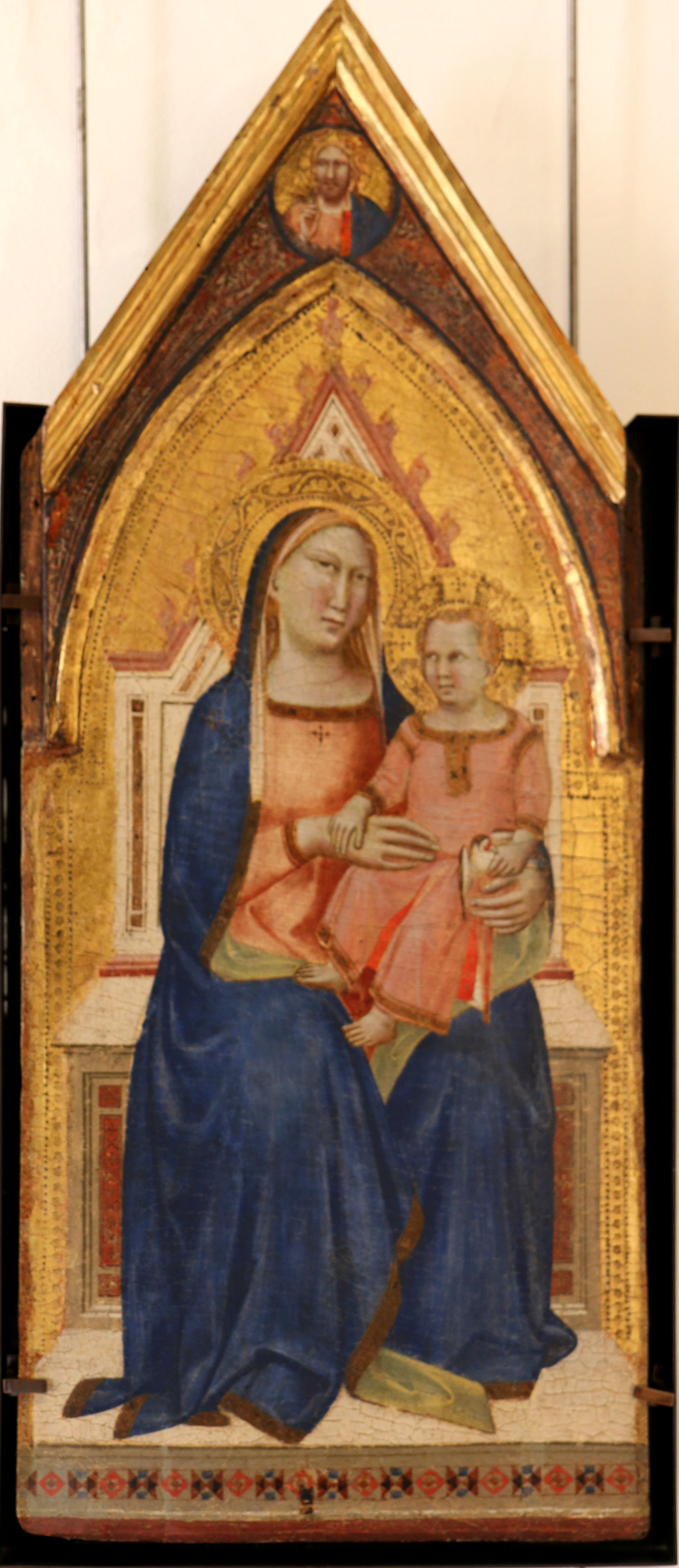
Taddeo Gaddi, Madonna with Child.

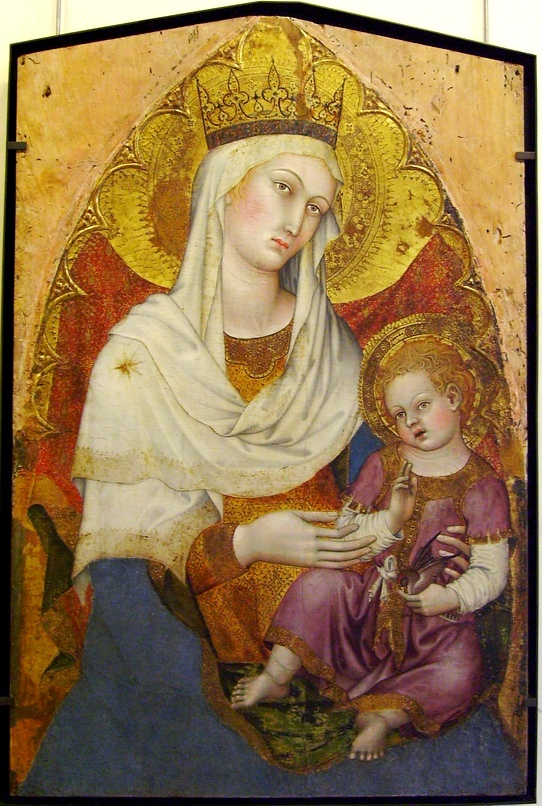
Taddeo di Bartolo, Madonna with Child, (1400).

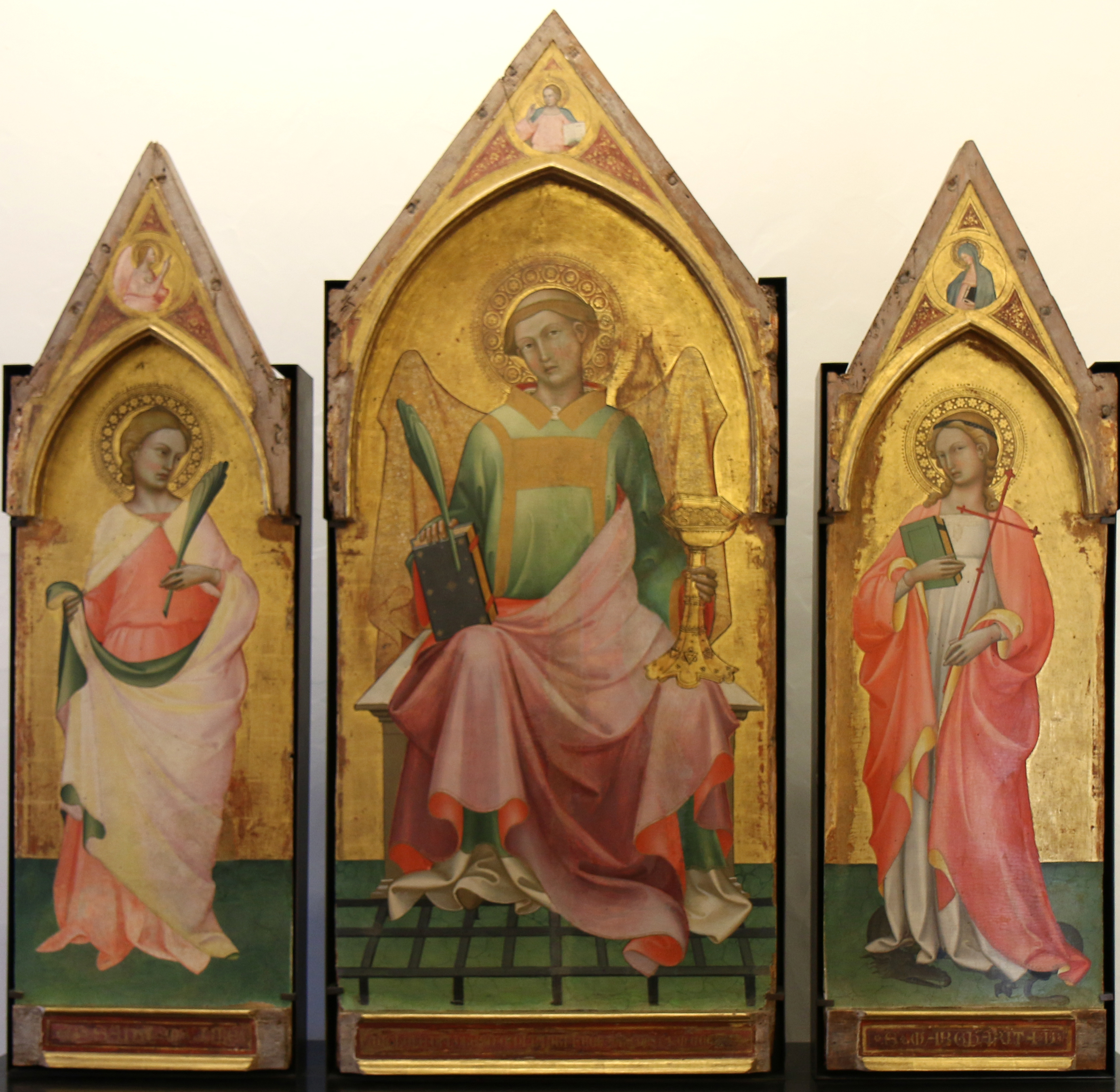
Lorenzo Monaco, Saint Laurent between Saint Ansano and Saint Margaret.

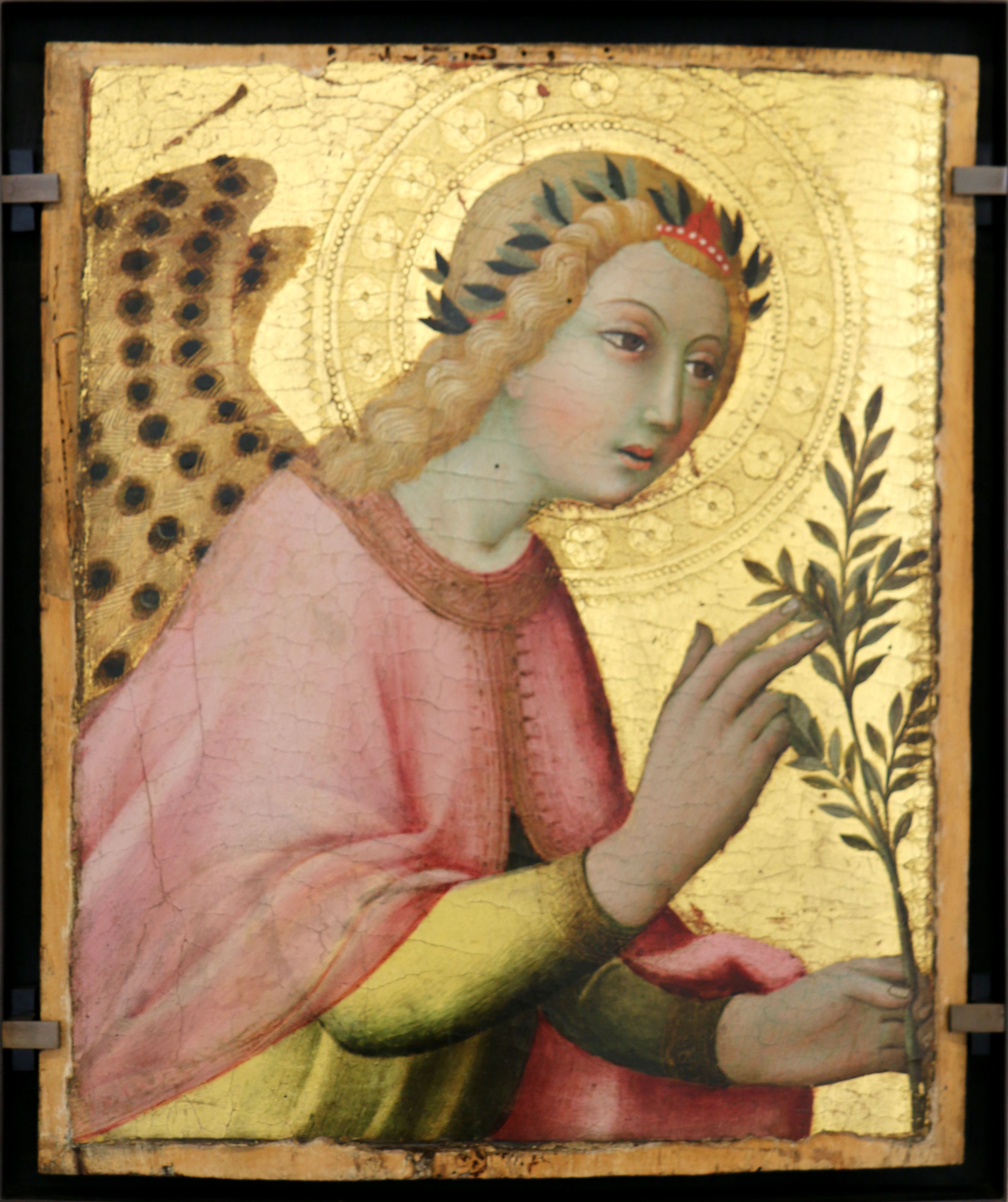
Sano di Pietro, Angel of the Annunciation.

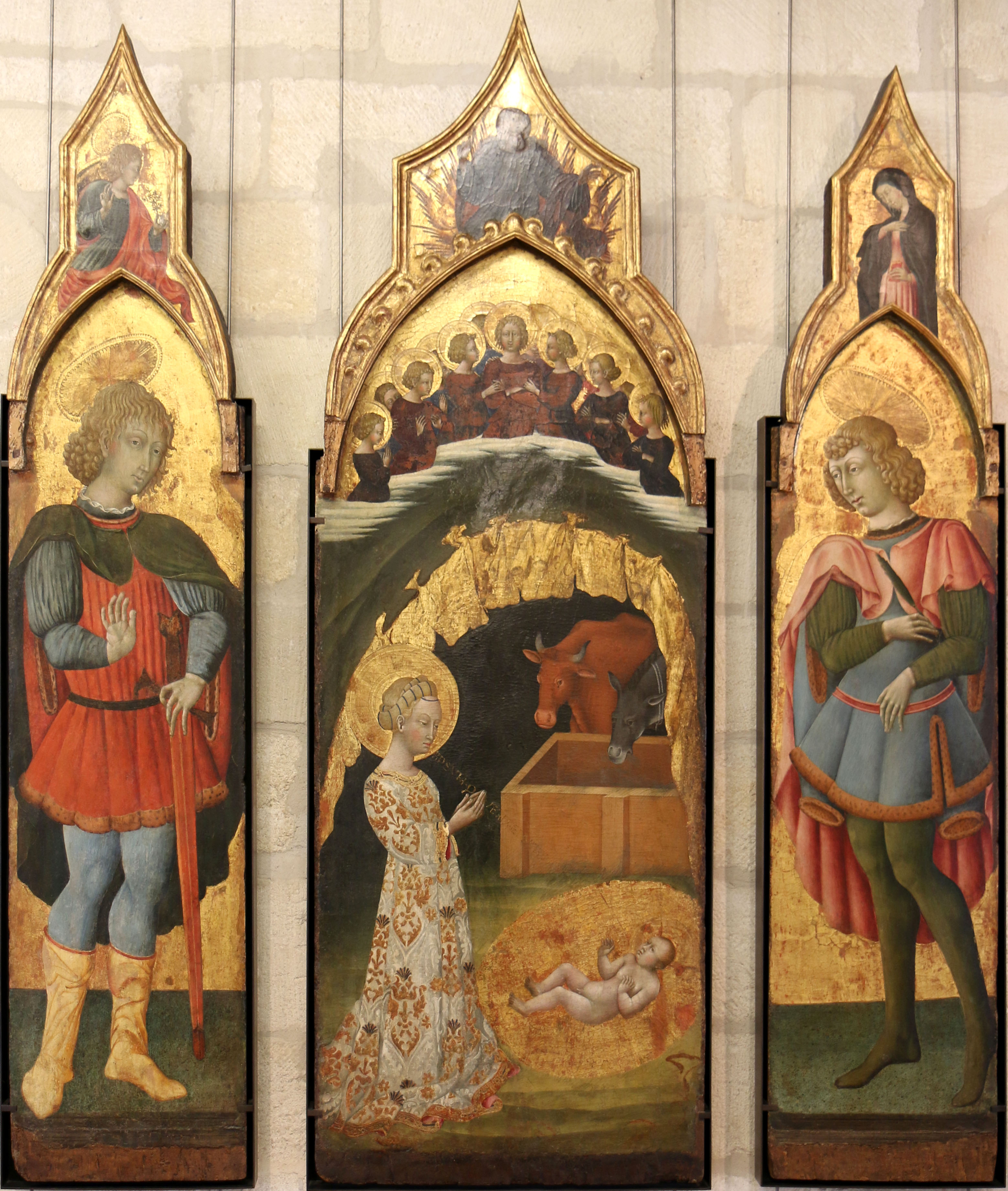
Giovanni di Paolo, The Nativity between Saint Vittorino and Saint Ansano or Galgano.

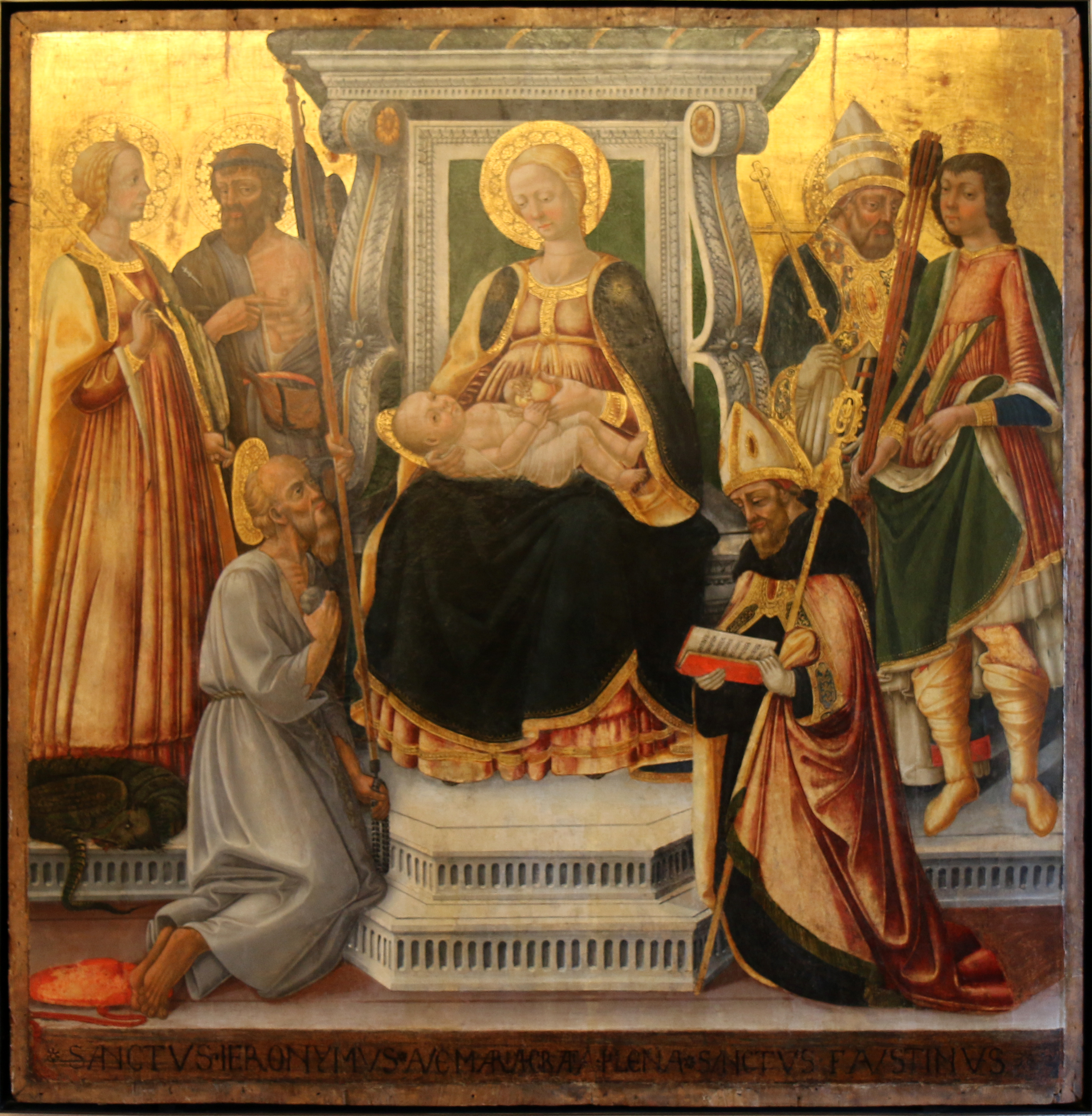
Neri di Bicci, Madonna with Child and six saints.

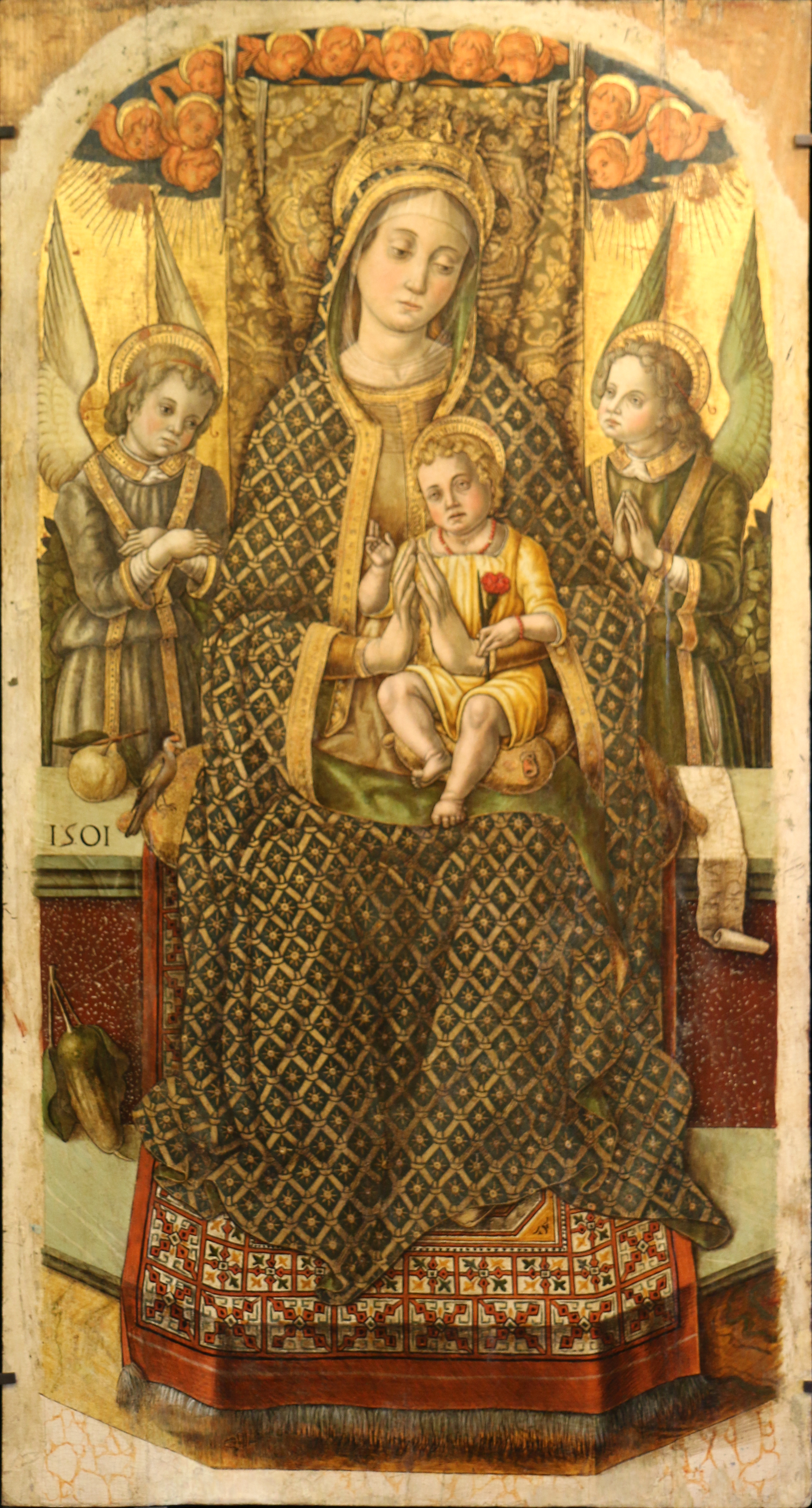
Vittorio Crivelli, Madonna with Child.

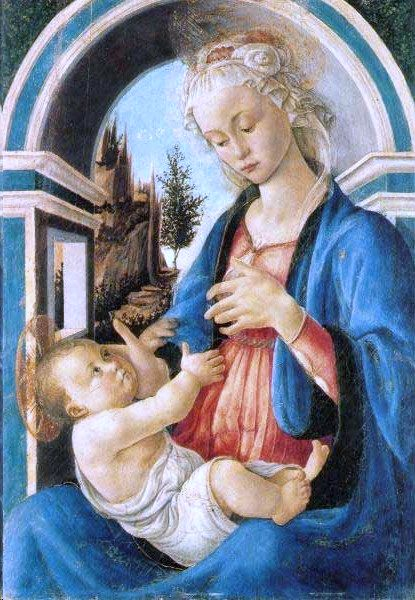
Sandro Botticelli, Madonna with Child, (1467).

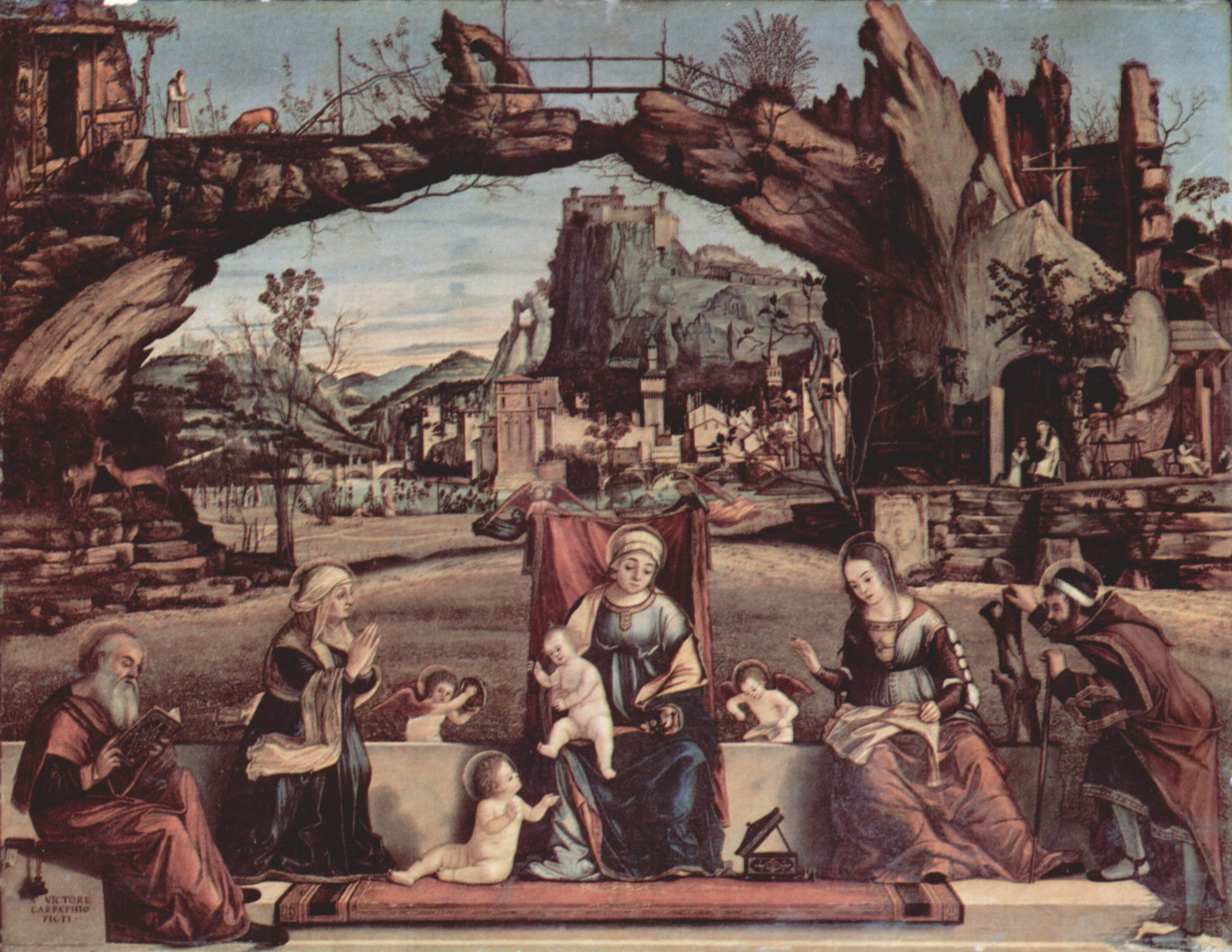
Vittore Carpaccio, Sacred conversation, (c. 1500).

== Sources ==
- Girard, Joseph (1958). Évocation du Vieil Avignon. Paris: Les Éditions de Minuit. OCLC 5391399.
- Vingtain, Dominique; Aujard-Catot, Roland, eds. (2001). Avignon: Musées, Monuments, Promenades (in French). Paris: Éditions du patrimoine. ISBN 2-85822-555-9.
