= Luca della Robbia =

Italian sculptor (1399–1482)

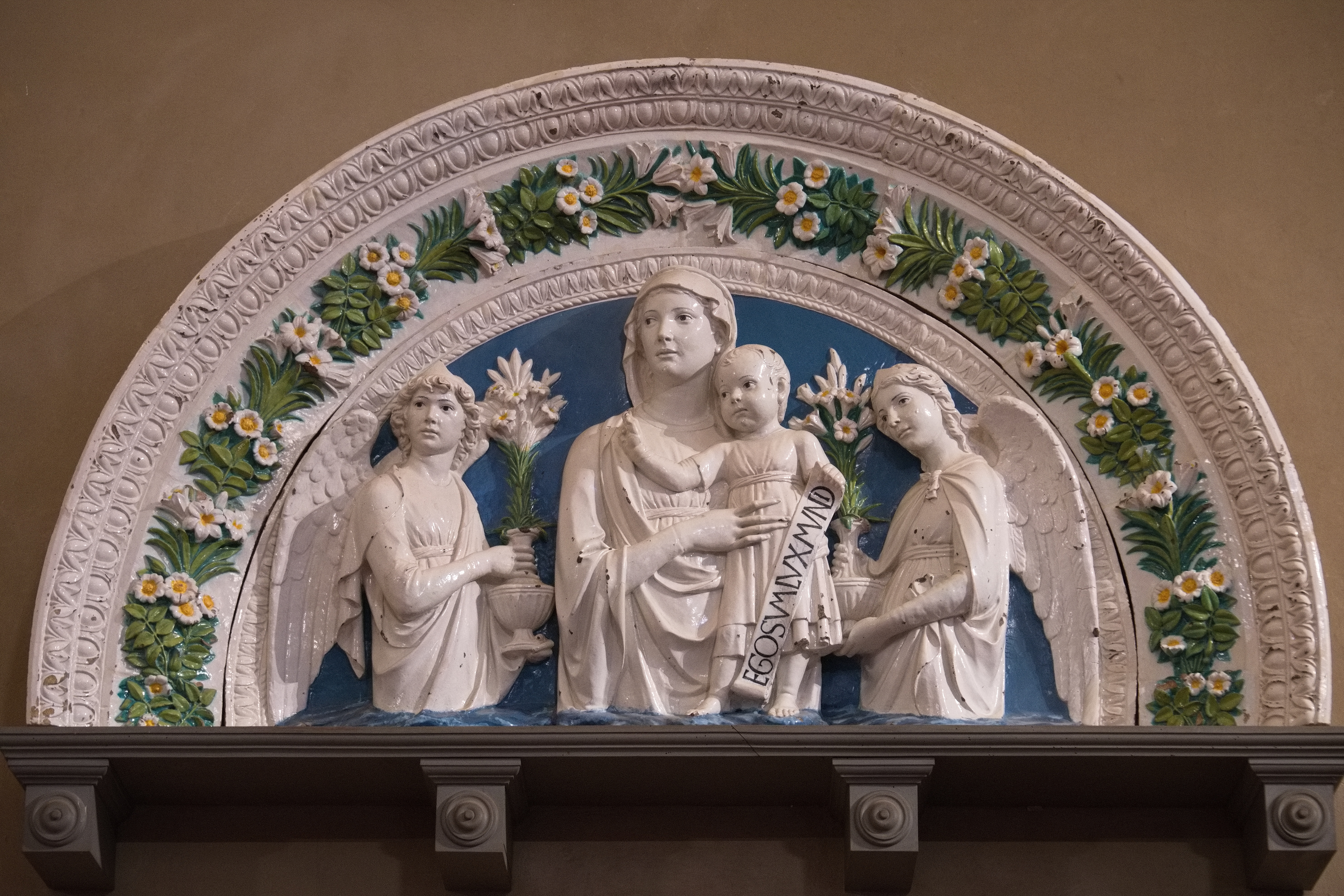
Madonna and Child with Angels from Via dell'Agnolo in Florence, um 1470, Bargello, Florence

Luca della Robbia (/ˌdɛlə ˈrɒbiə/, also US: /- ˈroʊb-/, Italian: [ˈluːka della ˈrobbja, - ˈrɔb-]; 1399/1400–1482) was an Italian Renaissance sculptor from Florence. Della Robbia is noted for his colorful, tin-glazed terracotta statuary, a technique that he invented and passed on to his nephew Andrea della Robbia and great-nephews Giovanni della Robbia and Girolamo della Robbia. Although a leading sculptor in stone, after developing his technique in the early 1440s he worked primarily in terracotta. His large workshop produced both less expensive works cast from molds in multiple versions, and more expensive one-off individually modeled pieces.

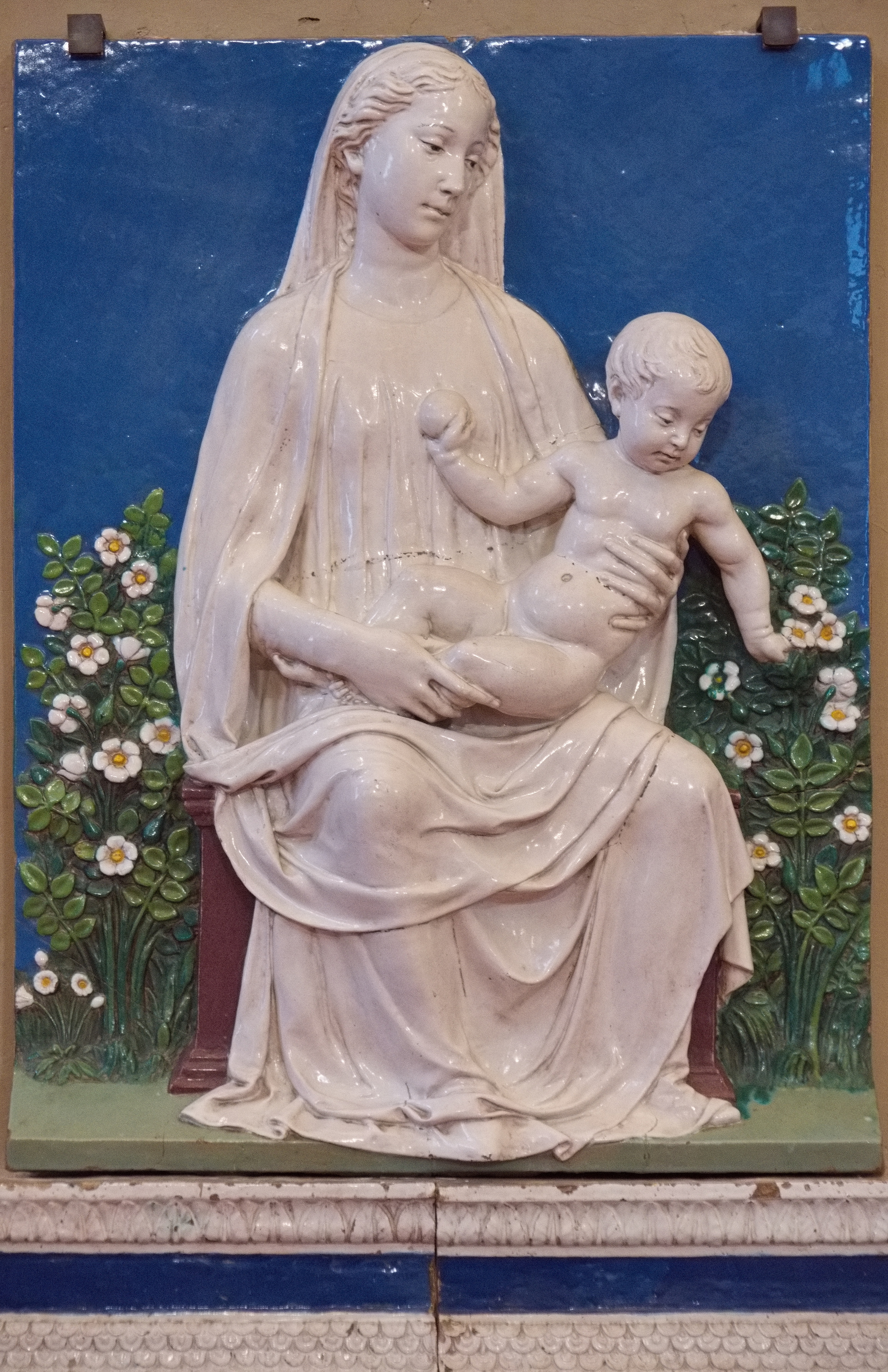
Madonna of the Rosebush, 1450–60, Bargello, Florence

The vibrant, polychrome glazes made his creations both more expressive and more durable. His work is noted for its charm rather than the drama of the work of some of his contemporaries. Two of his famous works are The Nativity (c. 1460) and Madonna and Child (c. 1475). In stone, his most famous work is also his first major commission, the choir gallery, Cantoria in the Florence Cathedral (1431–1438).

Della Robbia was praised by his compatriot Leon Battista Alberti for genius comparable to that of the sculptors Donatello and Lorenzo Ghiberti, the architect Filippo Brunelleschi, and the painter Masaccio. By ranking him with contemporary artists of this stature, Alberti noted the interest and strength of Luca's work in marble and bronze, as well as in the terra-cottas always associated with his name.

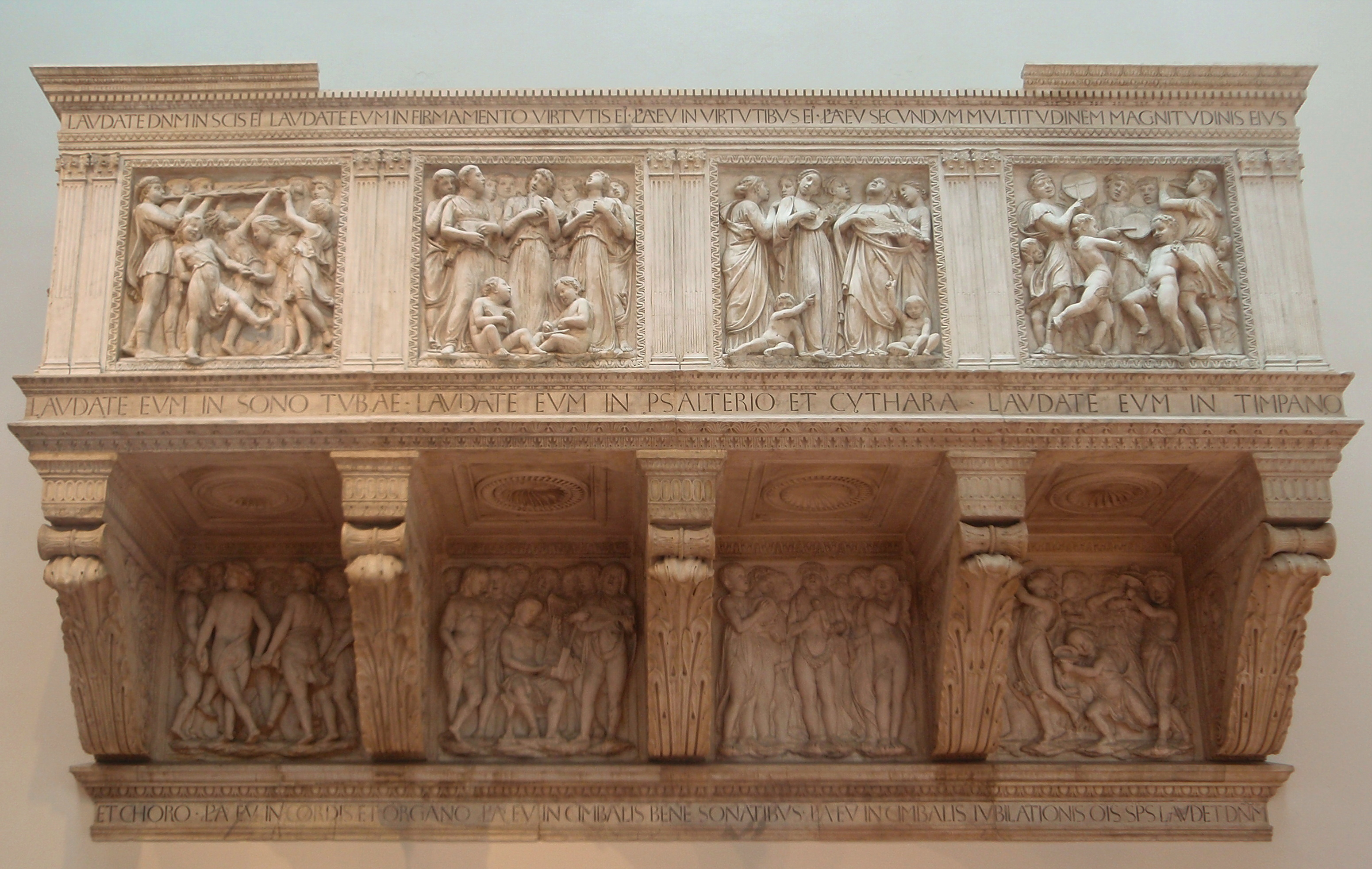
Cantoria (singing loft) by Luca della Robbia, 1431-38, his first known commission - Museo dell'Opera del Duomo, Florence

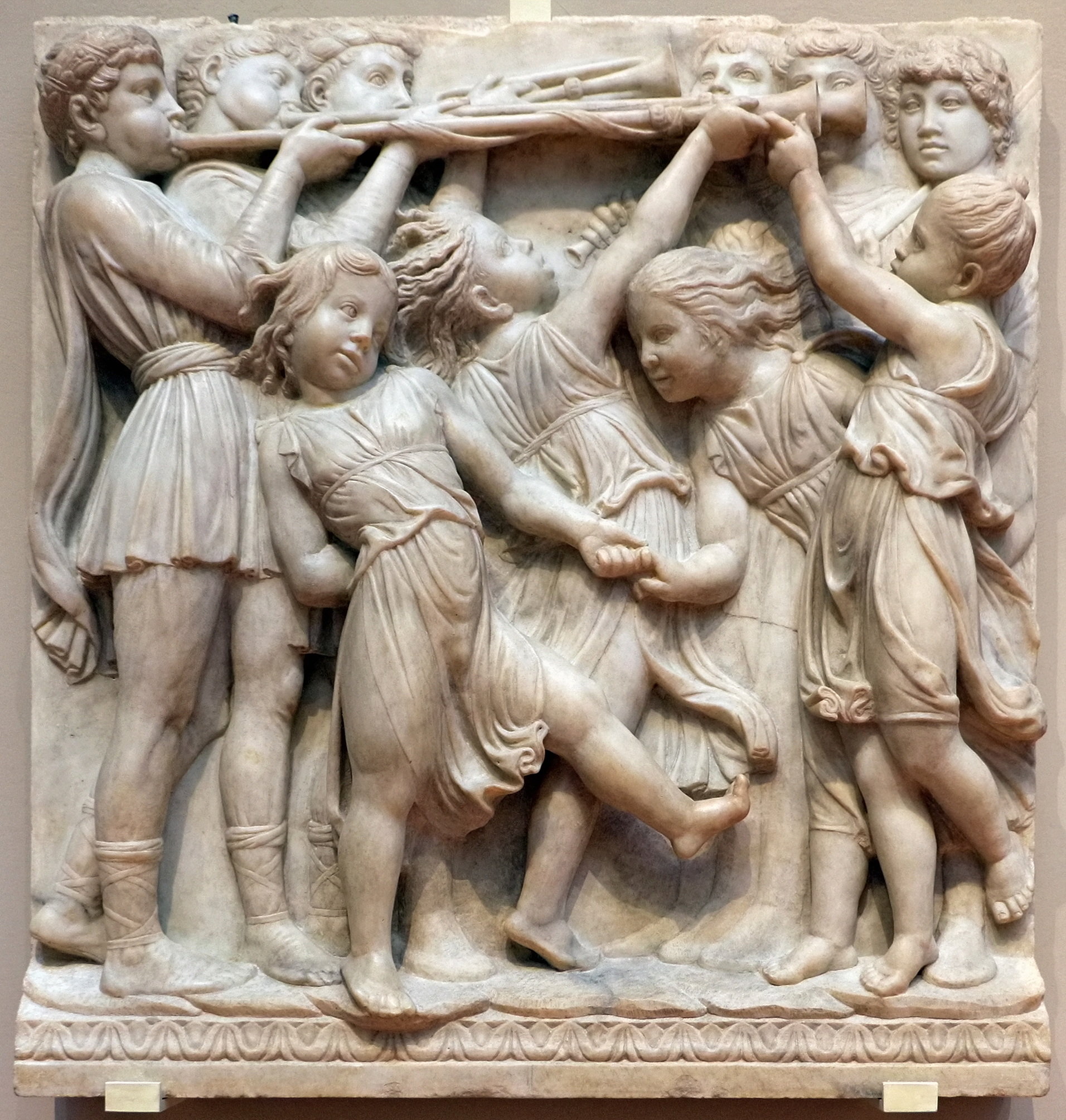
One of the panels of the Cantoria

== Biography ==
Vasari, Gaurico, and several other early writers give contradictory accounts of Luca della Robbia's youth, training, and early works. He was born in Florence, the son of a member of the Arte della Lana (wool-workers guild). He may have trained as a goldsmith under Leonardo di Ser Giovanni according to art historian Vasari, before working with Ghiberti on his first set of bronze doors for the Florence Baptistry. He was heavily influenced by Donatello, and in the 1420s, was used by the architect Filippo Brunelleschi for the sculptural decoration of his buildings, although the rondels of swaddled babies on the façade of the loggia of the Ospedale degli Innocenti were made by Andrea, ca. 1487, long after Brunelleschi's death in 1446).

His important commission for a cantoria ("singing gallery"; 1431–1438) in Florence Cathedral came before he joined the sculptor's guild Arte dei Maestri di Pietra e Legname (for workers in stone and wood) in 1432. According to Vasari, the Medici family were responsible for securing the commission for him.

=== Sculpture ===
His first documented commission was the Cantoria ("Singing Gallery"; 1431–1438) for the Cathedral of Florence, his major work in marble. During the seven years it took della Robbia to carve the reliefs under the supervision of Brunelleschi, his style developed. While the earliest carved panels are fairly symmetric and lack movement, in later panels the movement of the singers becomes much more evident and dynamic. The Singing Gallery shows children singing, dancing, and making music to "praise the Lord" in the words of Psalm 150. Their figures are at once lively, finely observed, and gracefully combined in groups designed to fit the ten panels of the gallery. The advanced nature of the work of the Cantoria has been seen to establish Luca della Robbia's skill in stone, as well as to secure his place as a major Florentine artist and student of Renaissance naturalism.

In the next two decades, della Robbia executed commissions like the series of small marble reliefs (1437) for the bell tower of the Cathedral of Florence; and, in collaboration with Michelozzo, the large project of bronze doors for the sacristy of the cathedral. These doors were not finished until 1469; their reliance on a few figures placed in simple, orderly compositions against a flat ground, contrasts sharply with the elaborate pictorial effects of Lorenzo Ghiberti's more famous baptistery doors.

Arguably one of the most important existing works in marble by Luca is the tomb of Benozzo Federighi, bishop of Fiesole. Executed in 1454–1456, the tomb originally was placed in the church of San Pancrazio, Florence, but removed to San Francesco di Paola on the Bellosguardo road outside the city in 1783. In 1898, it was again moved to the church of Santa Trinita in Florence. An effigy of the bishop in a restful pose lies on a sarcophagus sculptured with graceful reliefs of angels holding a wreath that contains the inscription. Above are three-quarter length figures of Christ between St. John and the Virgin, of conventional type. The whole is surrounded by a rectangular frame formed of painted tiles. A bunch of flowers and fruit in brilliant realistic colors is painted on each tile with enamel pigments. Although the bunch of flowers on each is painted on one slab, the ground of each tile is formed of separate pieces, likely because the pigment of the ground required a different degree of heat in firing from that needed for the enamel painting of the center.

==== Terracotta ====
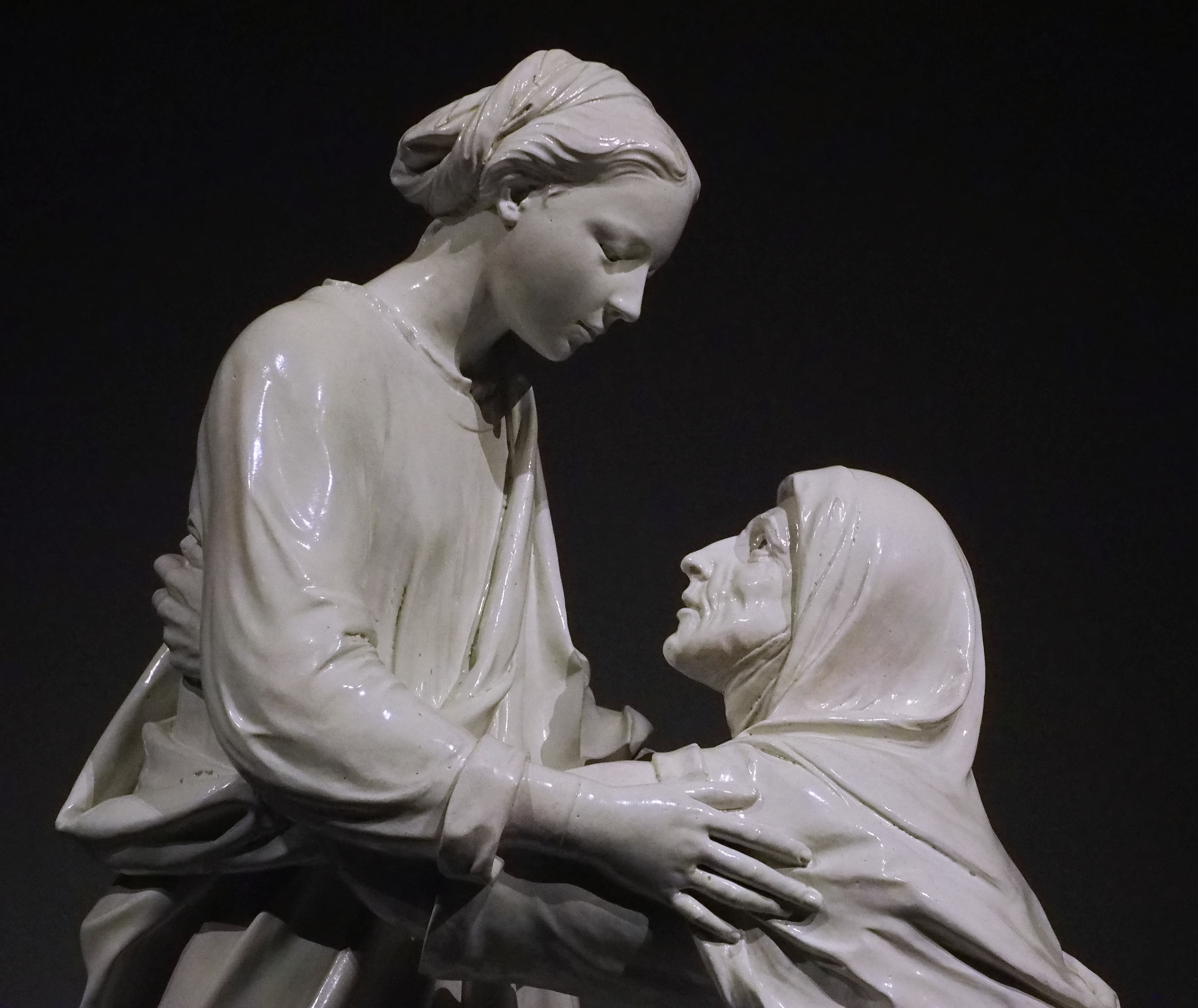
Visitation, 1445, San Giovanni Fuoricivitas, Pistoia, detail

Della Robbia's earliest surviving freestanding sculpture is the white tin-glazed terracotta Visitation in the church of San Giovanni Fuoricivitas of Pistoia, dating to 1445. Although the date of della Robbia's first work in colored glazed terra-cotta is not known, his demonstrated control of this medium secured him two major commissions for the duomo of Florence: the large reliefs of the Resurrection (also from 1445) and the Ascension of Christ(1446). The pliant medium of baked clay covered with a "slip" of vitrified lead and refined minerals permitted a lustrous, polished surface capable of reflecting light and color that was beautifully appropriate for architectural sculpture. Whether animating the vast, somber space of the Cathedral or in the series Twelve Apostles gracing the pristine surfaces of the small Pazzi Chapel (1443–1450) in Florence, della Robbia's reliefs in this medium achieved a high level of mastery.

Working with assistants, including members of his own family, della Robbia produced a number of decorative reliefs and altarpieces until the end of his life. One of the arguably finest examples is the enameled terra-cotta ceiling (1466) of the Chapel of the Cardinal of Portugal in San Miniato, Florence. Another relief, acquired by the Victoria and Albert Museum in 1861, shows his free use of color: an enormous medallion containing the arms of René of Anjou, and other heraldic devices; it is surrounded by an intricately modeled wreath of brilliantly colored fruit and flowers, including apples, lemons, oranges, and fir cones. This medallion was set up on the facade of the Pazzi Palace to commemorate René's visit to Florence in 1442.

His works were highly popular in his time and many were sent outside Florence; the larger ones could be disassembled to facilitate transport. In 1446, he bought a large house containing a workshop, which would remain the base of the family workshop until the 1520s.

In 1471, Luca della Robbia was elected president of the Florentine Guild of Sculptors, but he refused on account of his age and infirmity. His election demonstrated, however, the very high esteem in which he was held by his contemporaries. He died in Florence during February 1482, taking most of his secrets of tin-based glaze with him.

=== Gallery ===
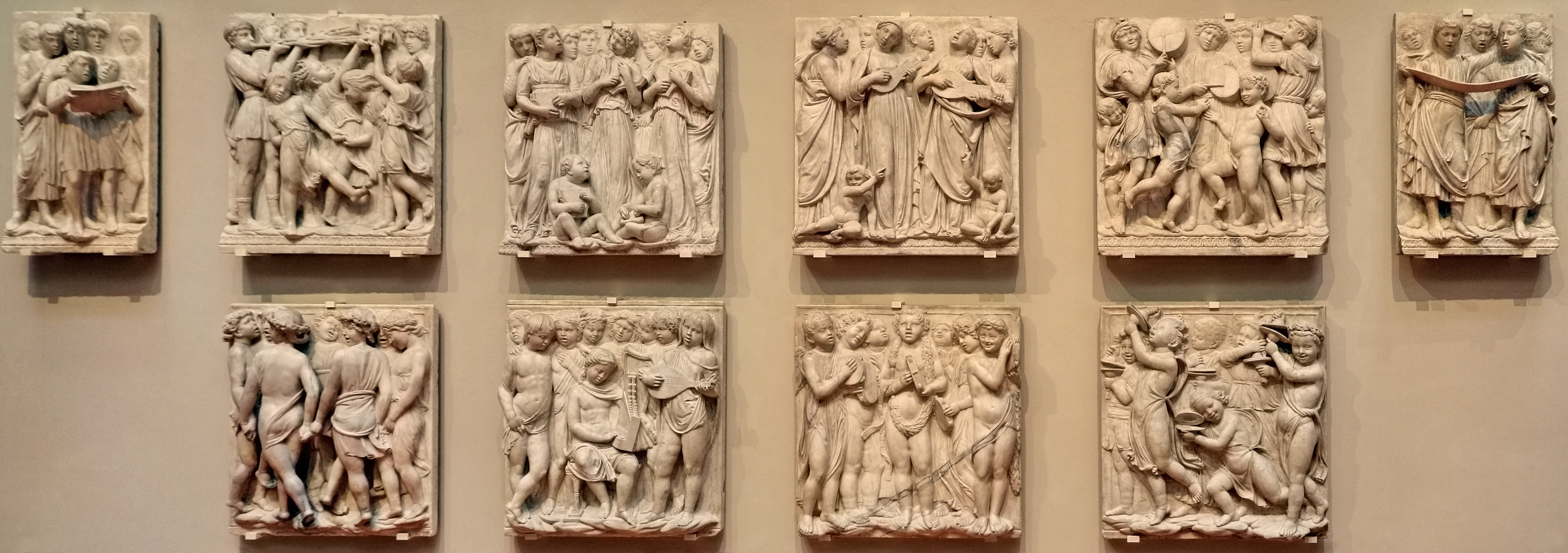
All ten original marble reliefs of the Cantoria (1431–1438) in the Museo dell'Opera del Duomo, Florence

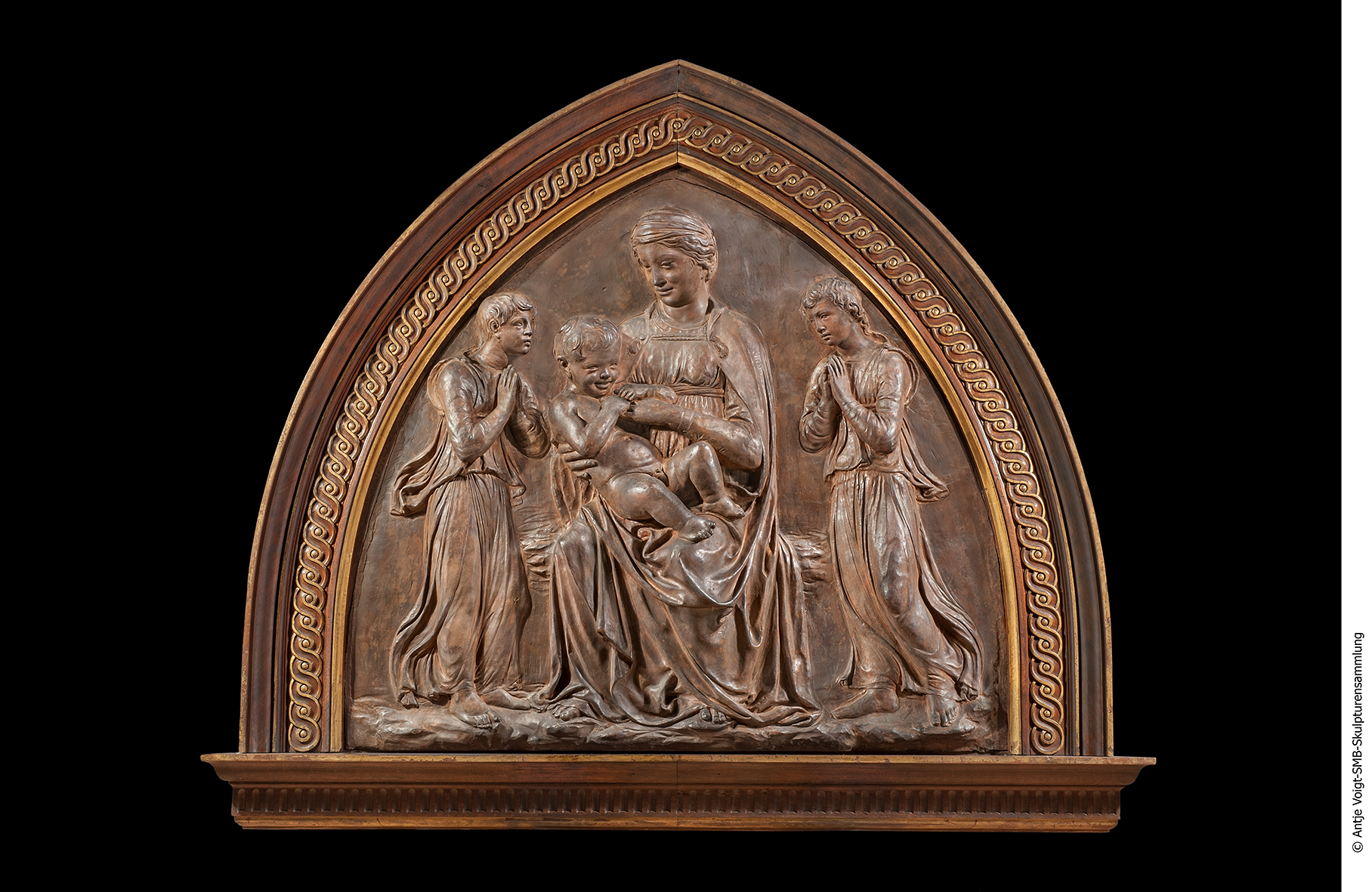
Mary and Child with Two Adoring Angels, ca. 1430–1440, polychromed, 109,5 × 130,5 cm, Bode Museum, Berlin

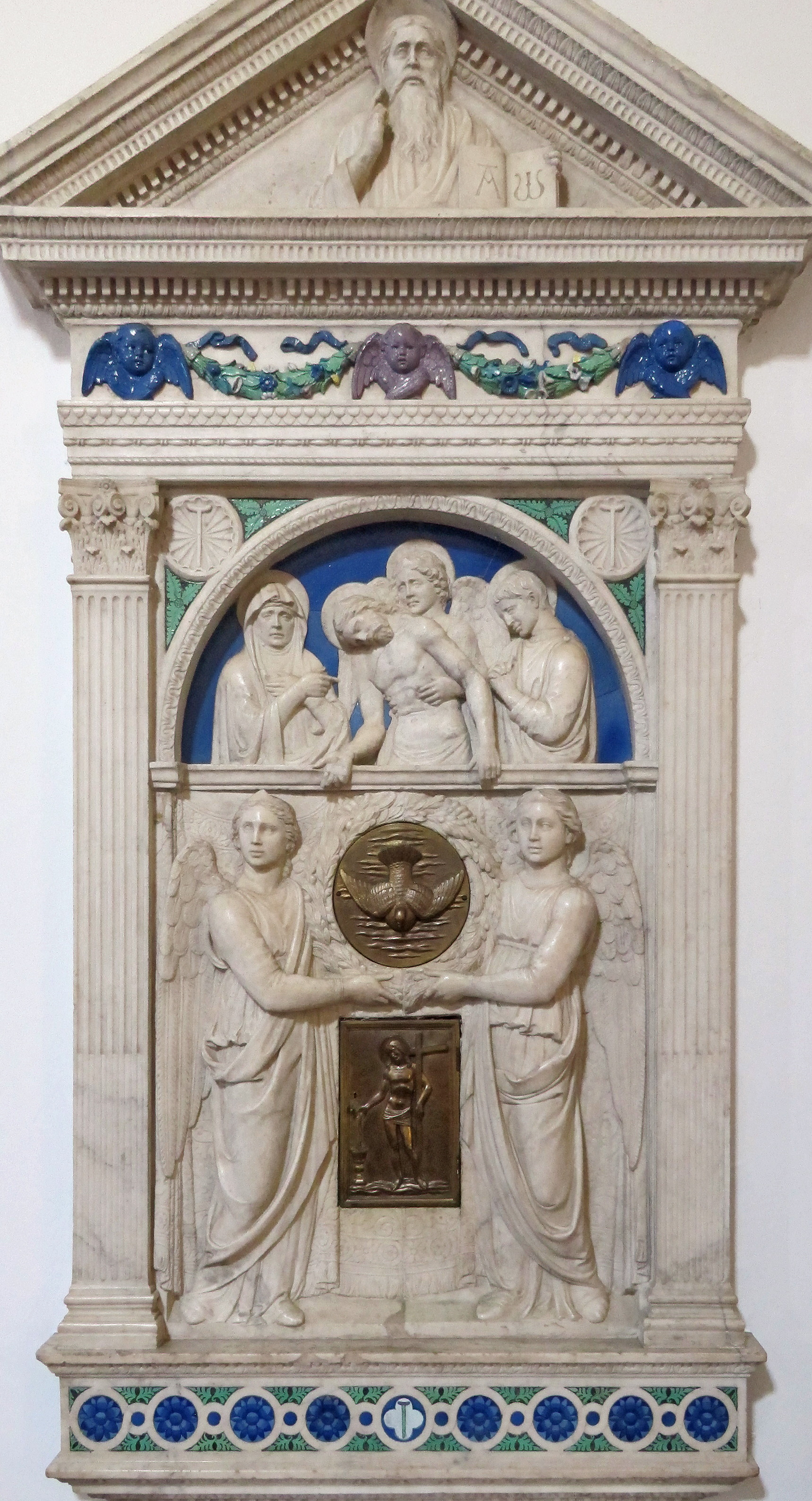
Ciborium from the Ospedale di Santa Maria Nuova, Florence, ca. 1443

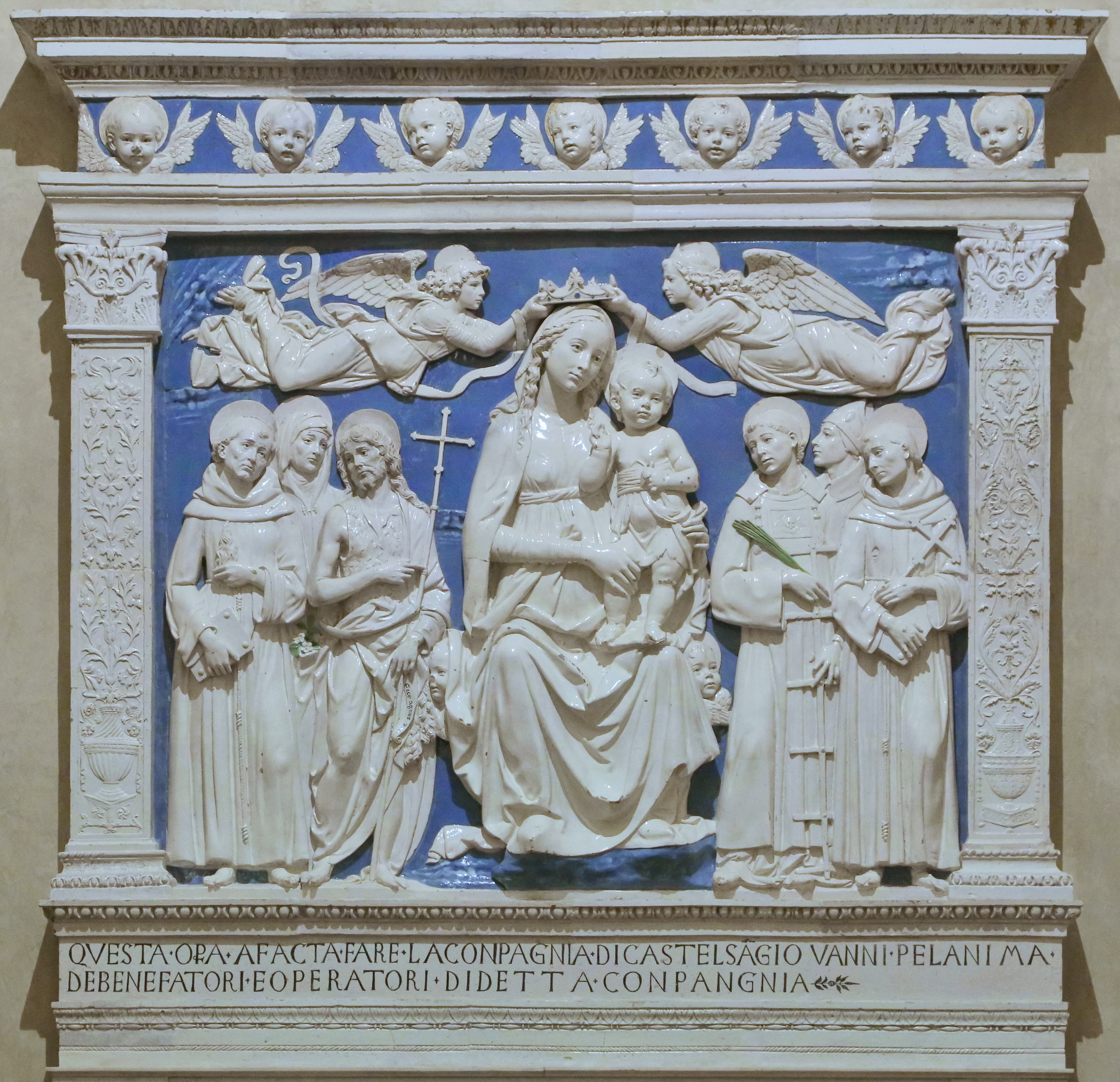
Madonna Enthroned, Medici chapel, Santa Croce, Florence

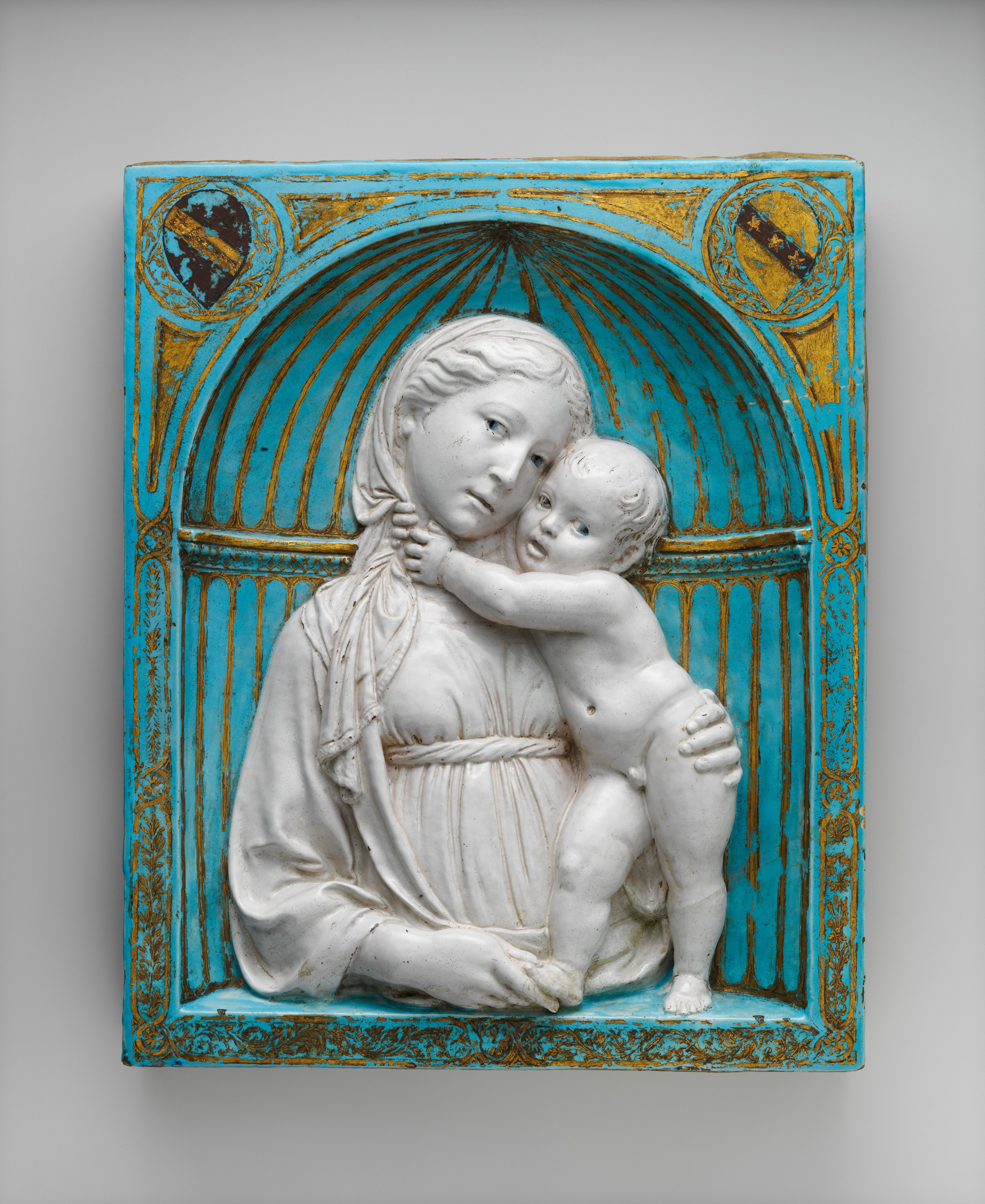
Virgin and Child in a Niche, ca. 1460, Metropolitan Museum of Art, New York

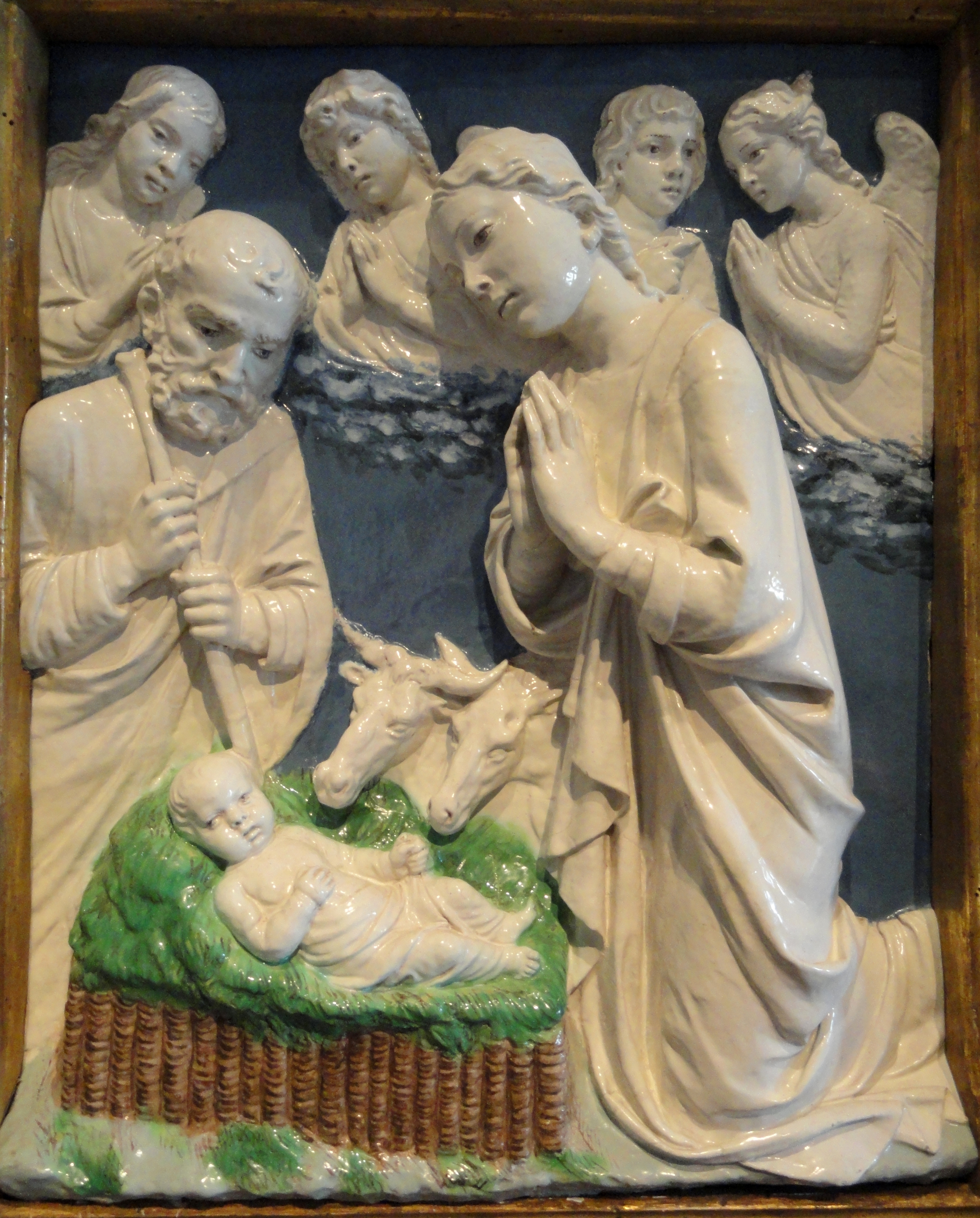
Nativity, ca. 1460, National Gallery of Art, Washington

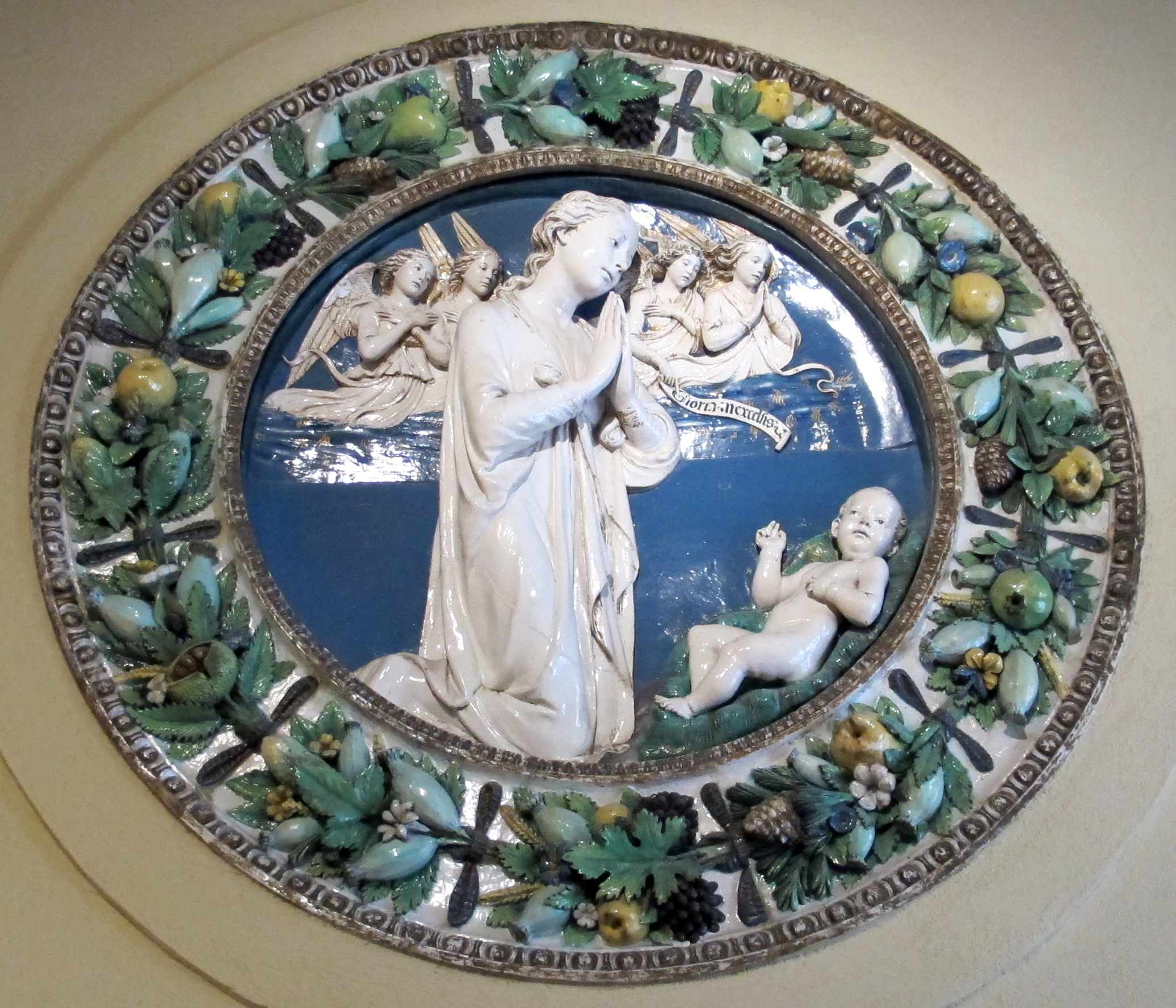
Roundel by Luca and Andrea della Robbia, ca. 1460–1480, Philadelphia Museum of Art

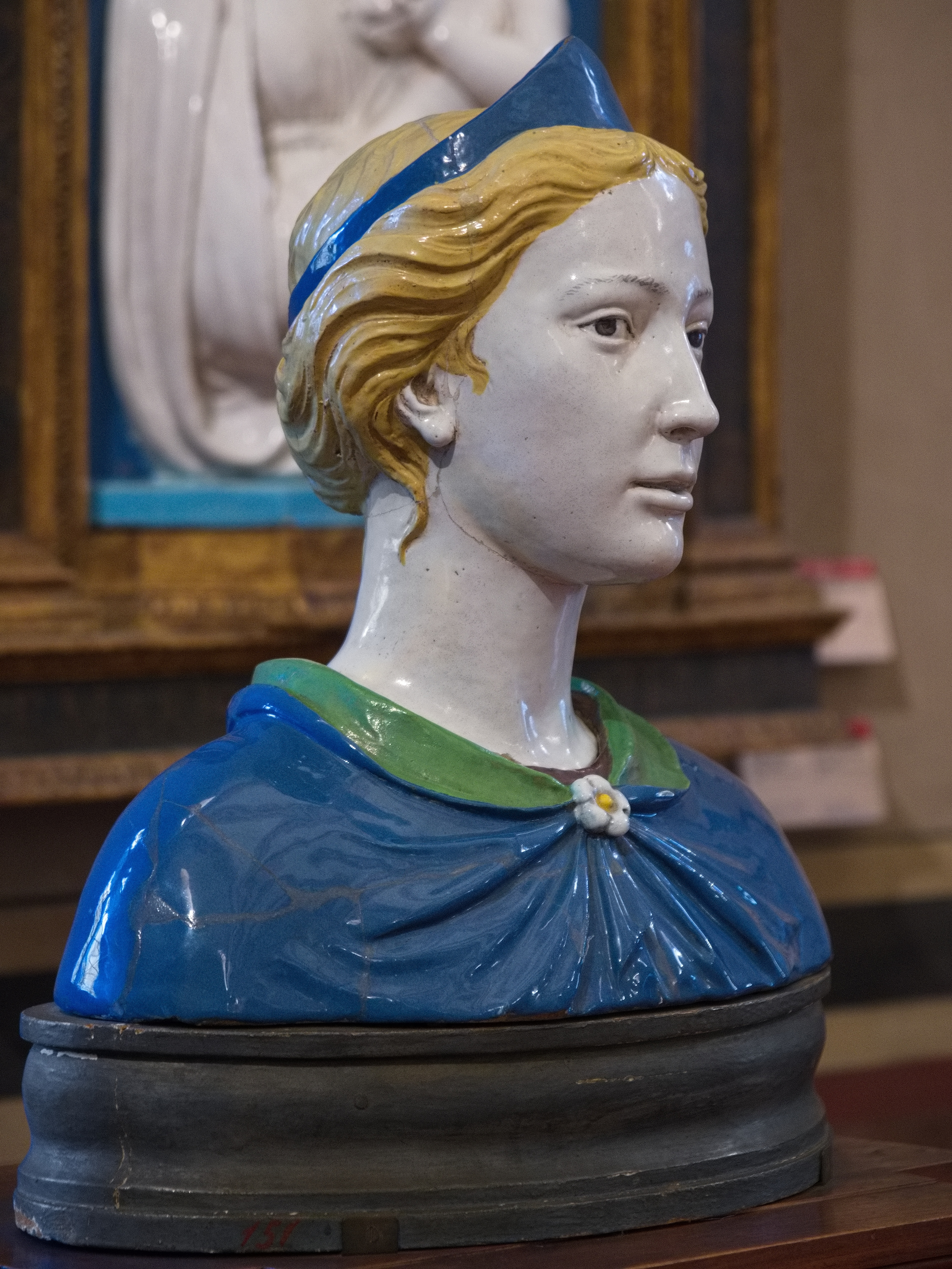
Bust of a Saint from the pharmacy of the convent of San Marco, Florence, 1465–1470, Bargello, Florence

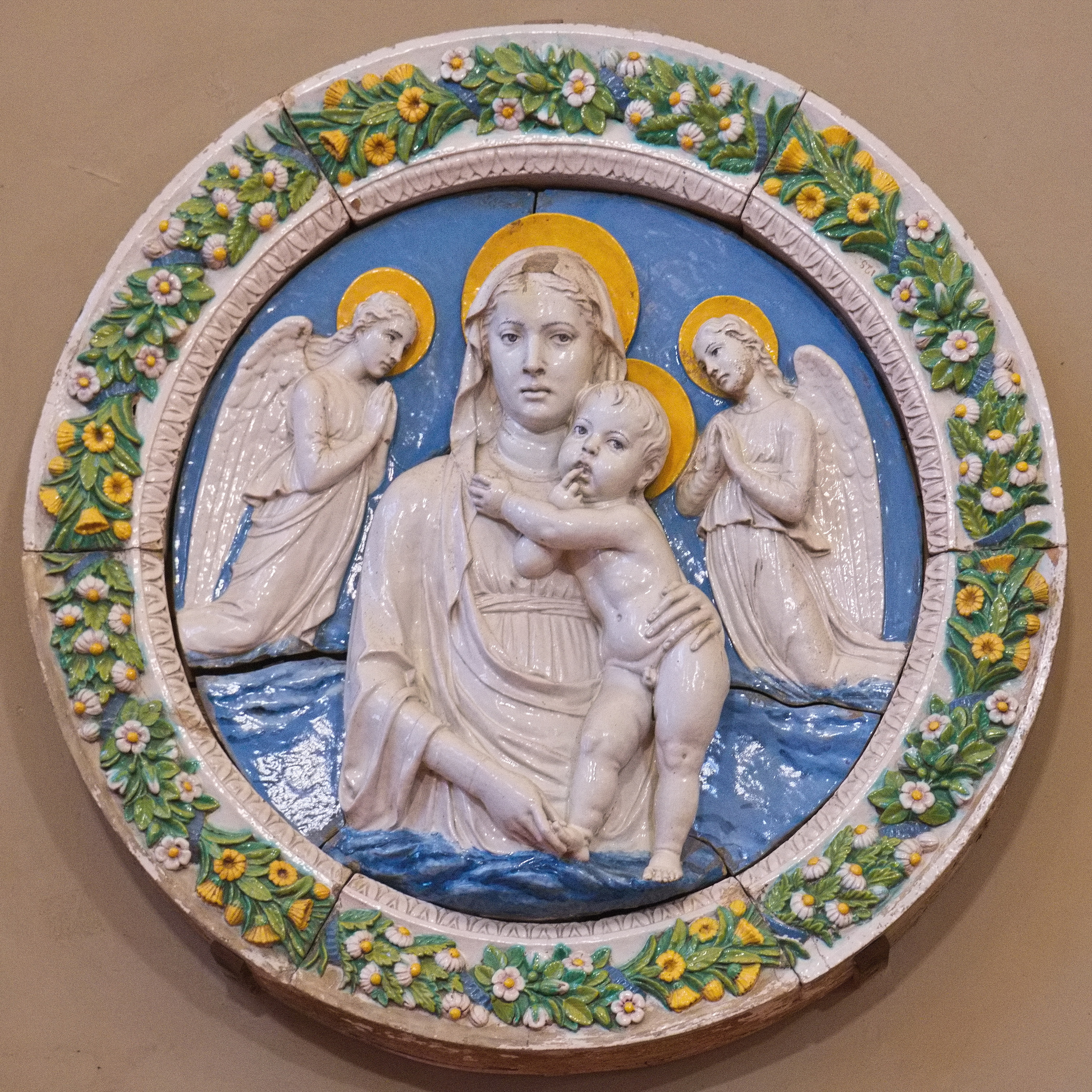
Madonna and Child with Angels, tondo from the Capucine convent in Florence, Bargello, Florence

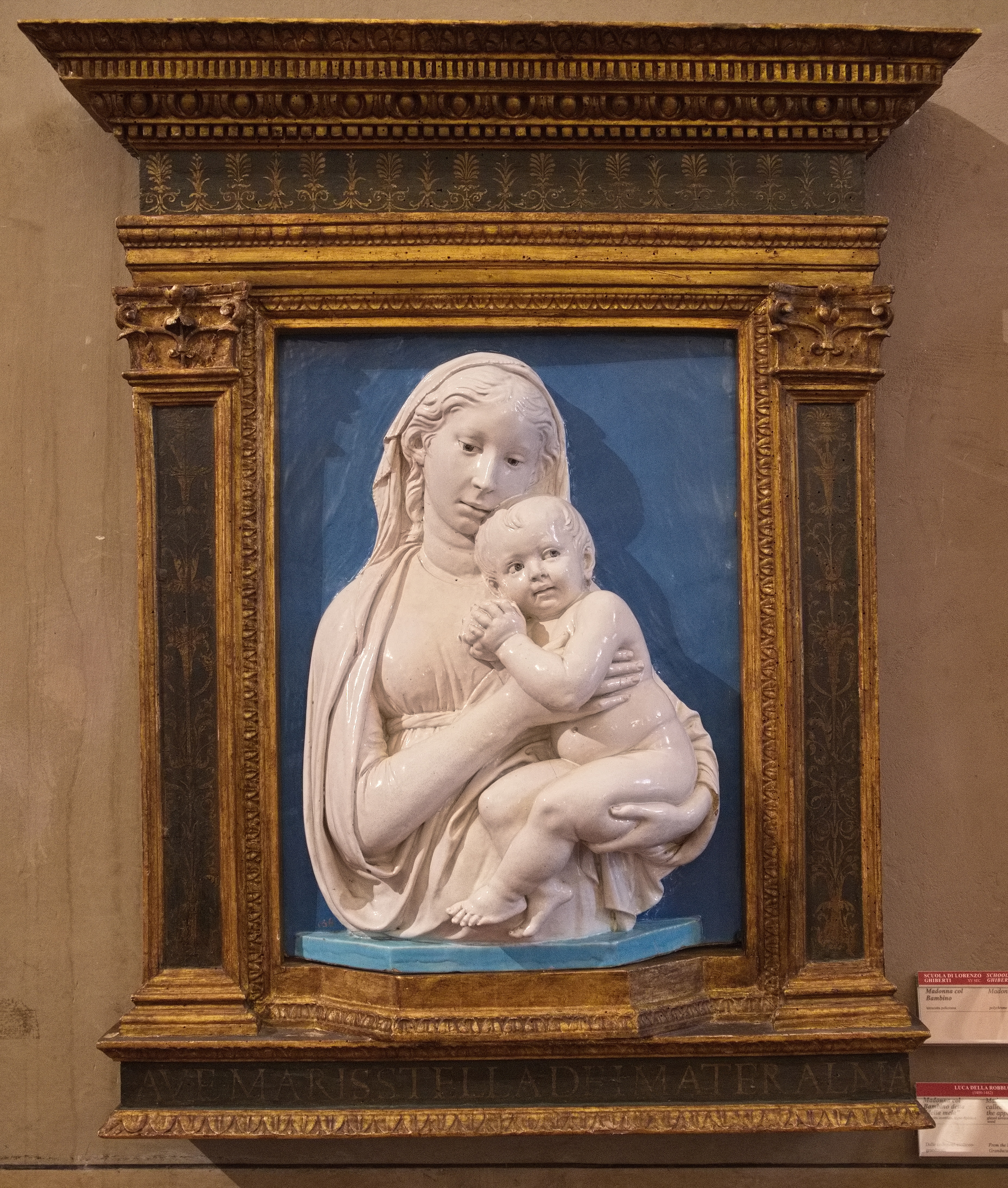
Madonna of the Apple, Bargello, Florence
