= Madonna and Child (Botticelli, Avignon) =

Painting by Sandro Botticelli

Madonna with child
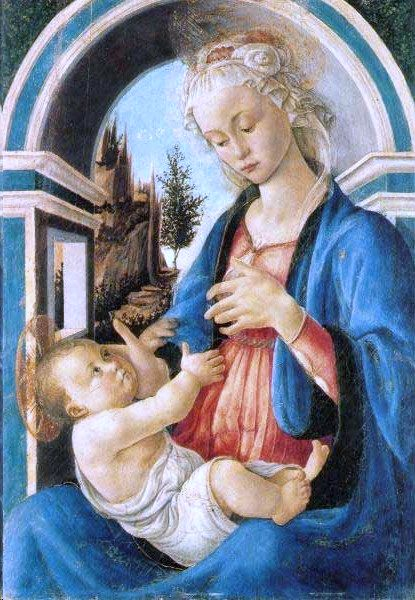
- Artist: Sandro Botticelli
- Year: c. 1467
- Medium: Tempera on panel
- Dimensions: 71 cm × 51 cm (28 in × 20 in)
- Location: Musée du Petit Palais, Avignon

Madonna with Child is a tempera painting on panel by Italian Renaissance painter Sandro Botticelli, dating to c. 1467 and housed in the Musée du Petit Palais of Avignon, France.

== See also ==
- List of works by Sandro Botticelli

== Sources ==
- Capretti, Elena (1 January 2002). Botticelli. Giunti Editore Firenze Italy. ISBN 978-88-09-21433-0.
- Deimling, Barbara (1 May 2000). Sandro Botticelli, 1444/45-1510. Taschen. ISBN 978-3-8228-5992-6.
- Malaguzzi, Silvia (2004). Botticelli. Giunti Editore Firenze Italy. ISBN 978-88-09-03677-2.
