= Vittorio Crivelli =

Italian painter

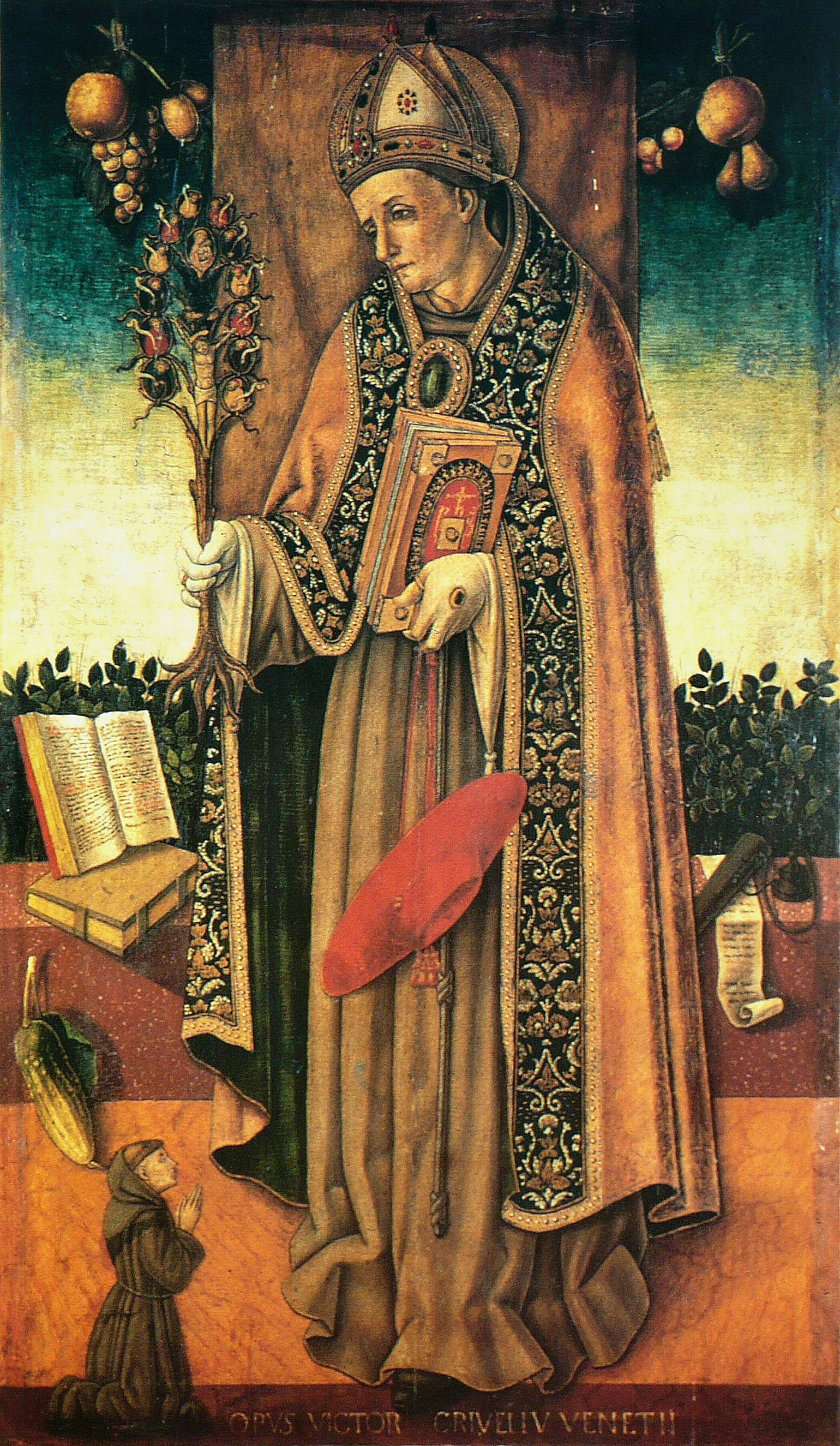
St. Bonaventure holding the tree of the redemption, Musée Jacquemart-André, Paris

Vittorio (or Vittore) Crivelli (c. 1440 – 1501 or 1502) was an Italian painter and brother of Carlo Crivelli. His works are similar in style to his brother's, but less accomplished. He was born and died in Venice.

There are examples of his work in the Metropolitan Museum of Art in New York, the El Paso Museum of Art, Texas, the Pinacoteca Brera in Milan, the Ashmolean Museum, Oxford, the Fitzwilliam Museum, Cambridge, the Musée du Petit Palais, Avignon or the Philadelphia Museum of Art. He painted a Madonna della Morte for a church in Massa Fermana, Marche.
