= Master of 1310 =

Italian painter

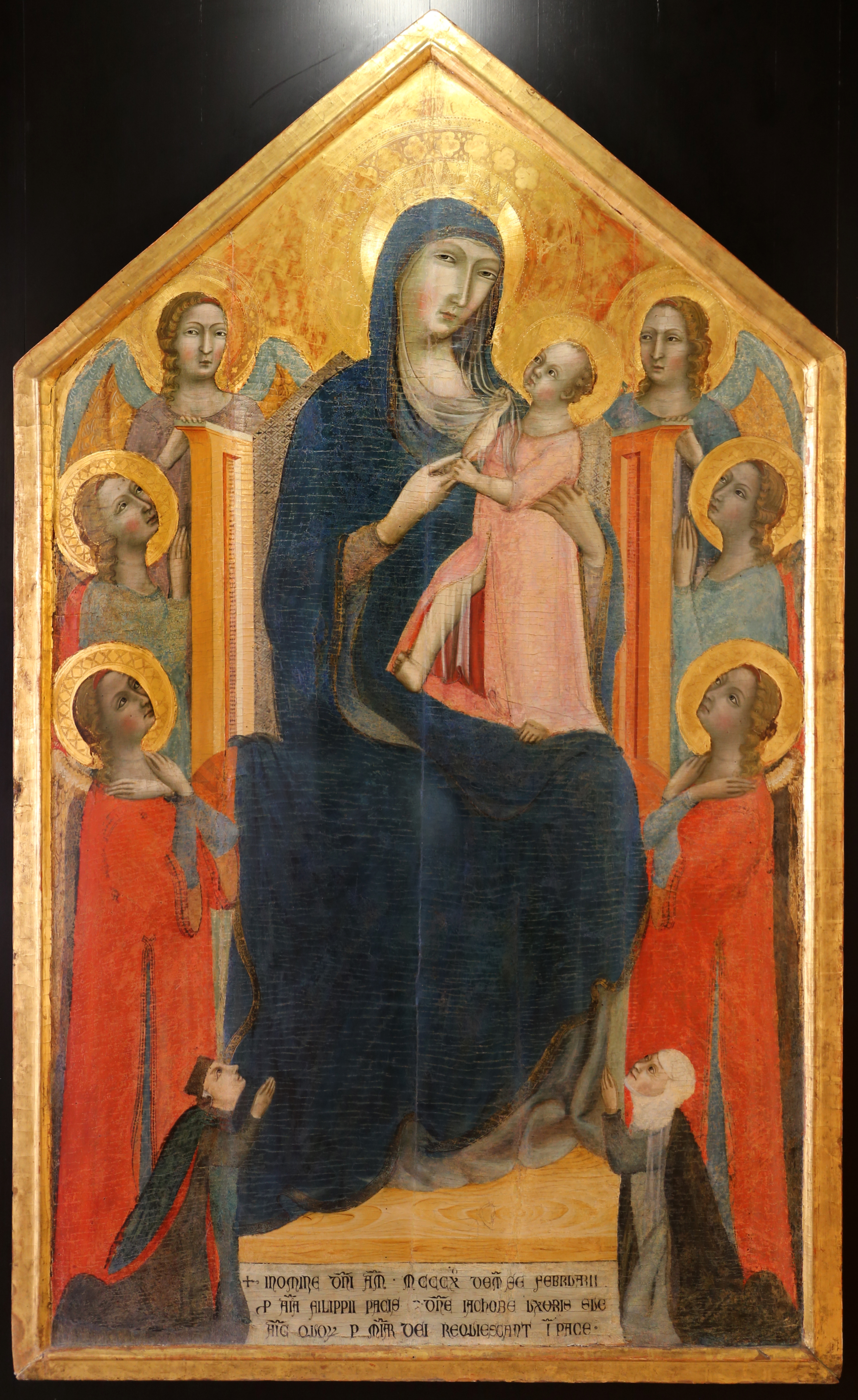
Madonna and Child with Angels and the Commandant Filippo Paci (1310), from which the Master of 1310 derives their name

The Master of 1310 (Italian: Maestro del 1310) was an Italian painter active in Pistoia at the end of the 13th into the beginning of the fourteenth century.

His name is derived from an altarpiece depicting the Madonna and Child with Angels and the Commandant Filippo Paci, today held in the Grand Palais in Avignon and dated to 1310. Stylistically, this painting shows a heavy French Gothic influence. A series of frescos in the church of San Giovanni Fuoricivitas in Pistoia, dated to 1307, is also ascribed to him; this depicts the story of the Passion in fairly expressionistic terms. Another altarpiece, a Madonna and Child with Saints on the high altar of the church of Mary Magdalene in the convent of the Humiliati in Pistoia, today in its Civic Museum, has been ascribed to his late period.

The attribution to him of a pair of frescoes in the same city's church of Saint Dominic, painted in the 1430s, has been contested.
