= Bruno Saetti =

Italian painter

- Born: 1902; Bologna, Italy
- Died: 1984 (aged 81–82); Montepiano, Italy
- Occupation: Painter

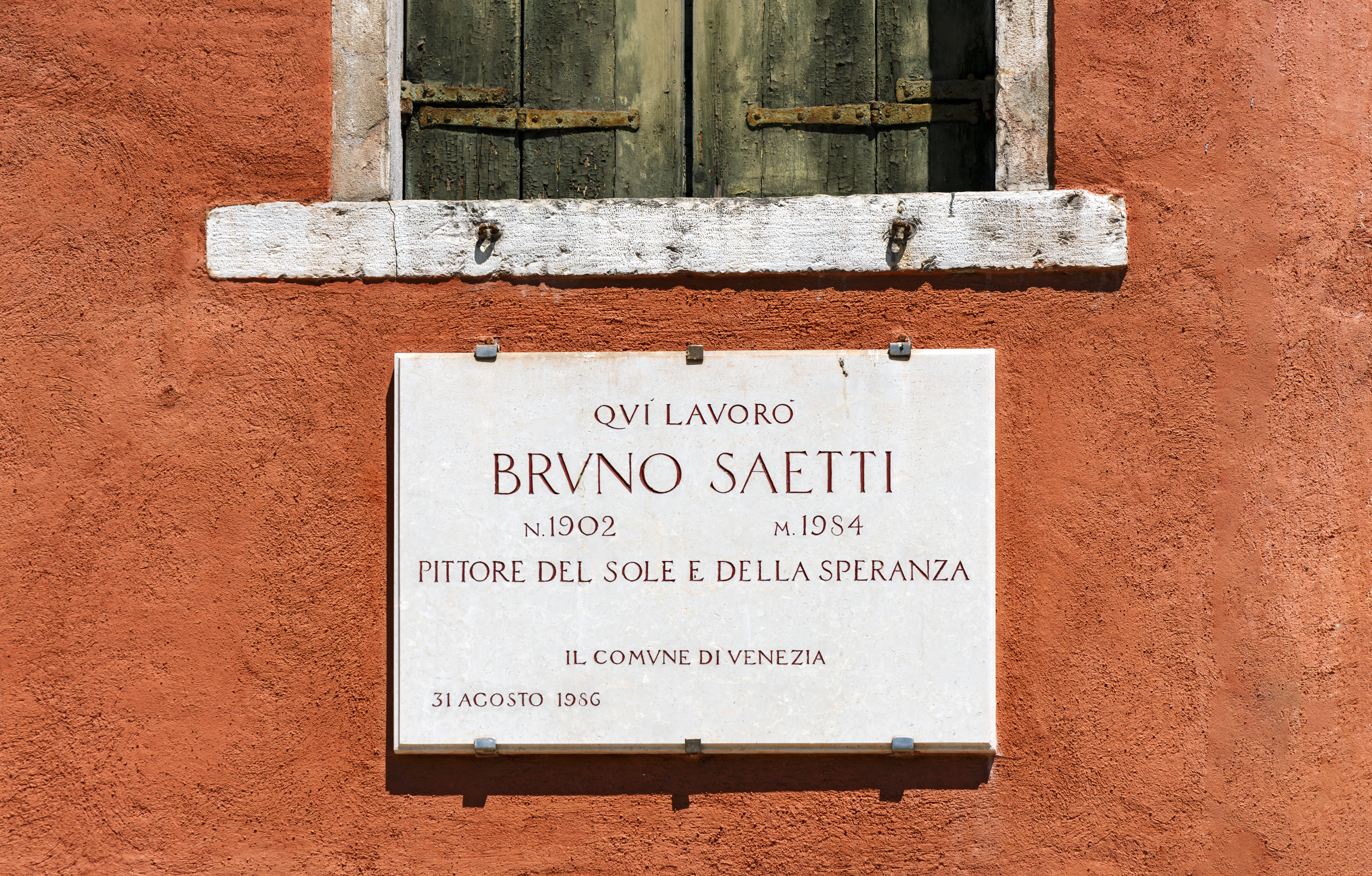
Here-worked plaques for Bruno Saetti in Campo S. Vidal, Venice

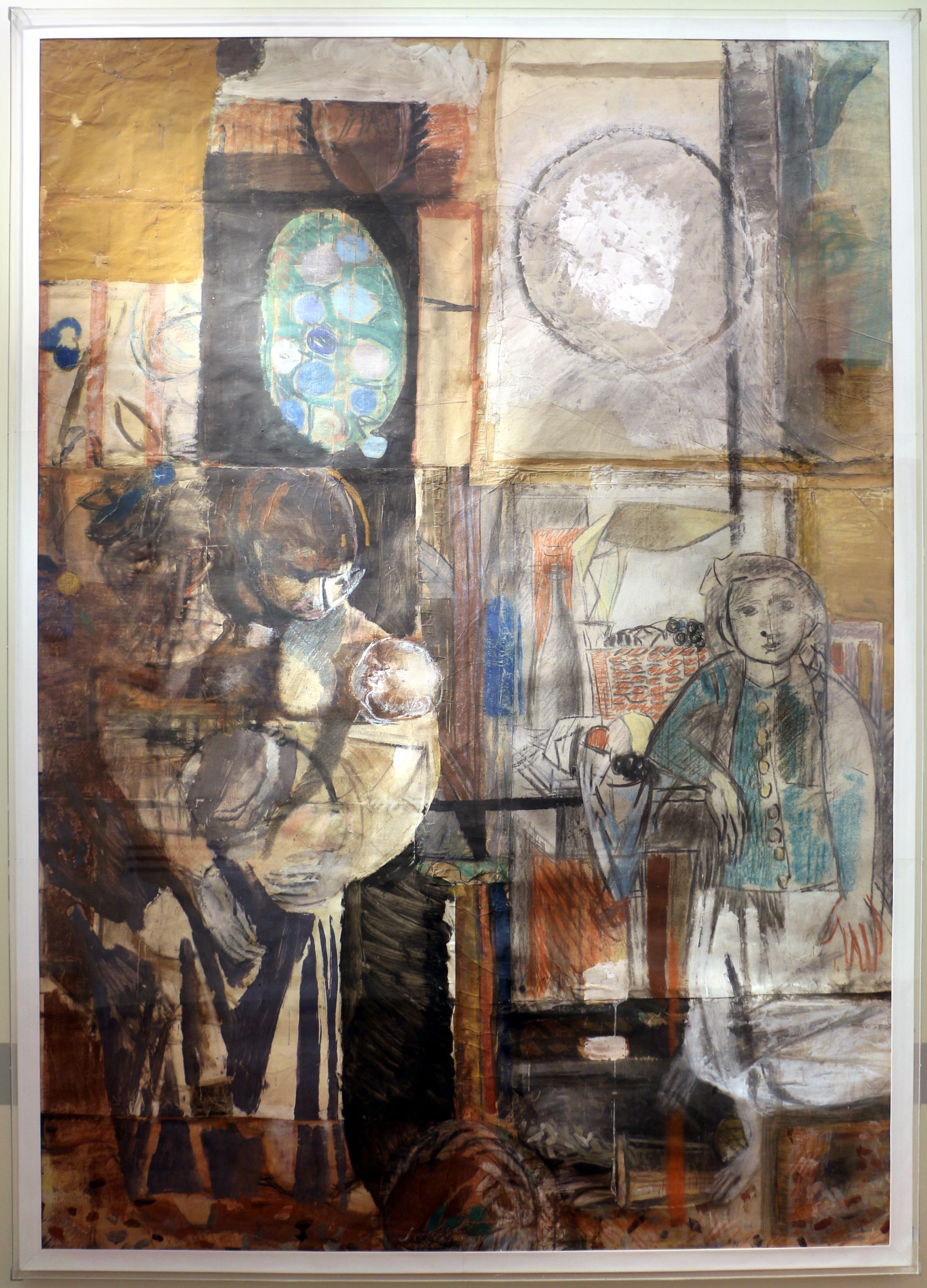
A 1956 painting by Saetti.

Bruno Saetti (1902-1984) was an Italian painter.
