= 1086 papal election =

Election of Catholic Pope Victor III

Papal election 1086

Dates and location
- 24 May 1086; Santa Lucia in Septisolio, Rome

Elected pope
- Desiderius; Name taken: Victor III
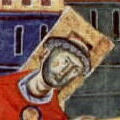

The 1086 papal election (held 24 May) ended with the election of Desiderius, abbot of Monte Cassino as Pope Gregory VII's successor after a year-long period of sede vacante.

== Death of Gregory VII ==
Pope Gregory VII died in exile in Salerno on 25 May 1085. Before his death, the Pope nominated three canons as his preferred successors. They were the cardinal-bishop of Ostia Odo of Châtillon, Bishop Anselm of Lucca, and Archbishop Hugh of Lyon. Rome was at that time under the control of antipope Clement III, supported by the emperor Henry IV, so almost a year before they proceeded to the election of the successor of Gregory VII.

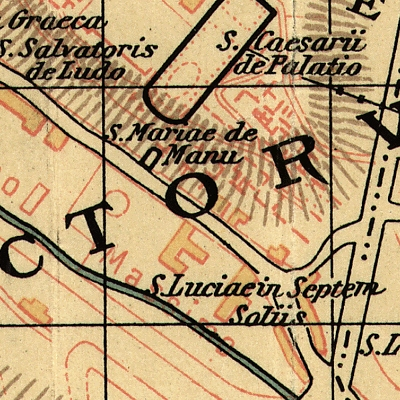
Map showing the location of Santa Lucia in Septisolio at the base of the Palatine Hill.

== Cardinal electors ==
The papal bull In nomine Domini of 1059 changed electoral law to permit only the seven cardinal-bishops of the suburbicarian sees to participate in papal elections. Doubts were harboured about the papal bull had been called into question by the cardinals priests who demanded admission to the election. The antagonism between the cardinal-bishops and cardinal-priests was intensified by the fact that Gregory VII clearly favored the latter. When Antipope Clement III was installed in Rome, he sentenced Gregory VII to exile. Gregory was joined by seven of eighteen (Note: Or eight of nineteen, if Cardinal-priest of San Clemente, Hugo of Remiremont is included. The cardinal had been excommunicated in 1078 and his titular church was given to the abbot Rainiero, the future Pope Paschal II.) so-called "Gregorian" cardinal-priests and only one cardinal bishop.

One of the reasons for the rebellion was that Gregory VII allowed only cardinal-bishops in the circle of advisors for the Holy See. Soon the schismatic clergy, those supporting the antipope, controlled 17 of 28 titular churches in Rome. Even the cardinal-priests who remained loyal to Gregory protested against the cardinal-bishops. A "Gregorian", Cardinal Deusdedit of San Pietro in Vincoli began to distribute a doctored version of the papal bull In nomine Domini, in which the word "cardinals-bishops" was replaced by "cardinals", which according to the nomenclature of the time meant only cardinal-priests. This allowed them to participate in the election of Gregory VII's successor. This was presumed to be the first time cardinal-priests were admitted, although the dominant role of cardinal-bishops was retained.

=== Cardinal-bishops ===
In 1086, in the obedience of Gregory VII were six cardinal-bishops: (Note: Appointment dates are approximate.)

- Ubaldo (1063) - Cardinal-bishop of Sabina
- Peter Igneus (1072) - Cardinal bishop of Albano
- Giovanni Minuto (1073) (Note: Before appointment as Cardinal-bishop, Cardinal Minuto was Cardinal-priest of Santa Maria in Trastevere (ca.1066-1073).) - Cardinal-bishop of Tusculum
- Otho de Lagery (1080) - Cardinal-Bishop of Ostia
- Bruno (1079) - Cardinal-bishop of Segni
- John (1085) - Cardinal-bishop of Porto

=== Cardinal-priests ===
Based on available data, it can also be inferred that there were only ten cardinal-priests in the obedience of Gregory VII, although it is possible that the data are incomplete:

- Desiderius, (1059) - Cardinal-priest of Santa Cecilia, abbot of Monte Cassino, vicar of southern Italy
- Benedetto Cao (1073) - Cardinal-Priest of Santa Prassede
- Deusdedit (1078) - Cardinal-priest of San Pietro in Vincoli
- Rainiero (1078) - Cardinal-priest of San Clemente, abbot of the Basilica of Saint Lawrence outside the Walls
- Richard de Saint-Victor (1078) - Cardinal-priest of the Basilica of Saint Paul Outside the Walls and Abbot of St. Victor, Marseille
- Herman de Gavardo (1080) - Cardinal-priest of Santi Quattro Coronati
- Benedict (1080) - Cardinal-priest of Santa Pudenziana
- Roman (1082) - Cardinal-priest of Santa Susanna
- Bonussenior (1082) - Cardinal-priest of Santa Maria in Trastevere
- Pietro Atenulfi (1085) - Cardinal-priest and abbot of Chiesa di San Benedetto in Salerno

It is not known whether the deacons of the Church participated in this election. It seems that deacons obedient to Gregory, were not even considered cardinals. It was not until about 1088 that the deacons of the palace (around seven deacons) joined the College as cardinal-deacons. This change occurred due to the schismatic Antipope Clement III. When, in 1084, three of the seven deacons of the palace joined the antipope they, in their records, began to refer to themselves as "cardinal-deacons". This concept was later borrowed by Urban II.

== Election of Victor III ==
After Gregory VII's death, the people expelled Antipope Clement III from Rome allowing for the return of Gregory's supporters. In May 1086, Norman troops arrived in Rome with the "Gregorian" cardinals, who proceeded to begin the papal elections. On 24 May 1086, meeting in the Chiesa di Santa Lucia in Sepitisolio, the cardinals elected Desiderius, Abbot of Montecassino and cardinal-priest of Santa Cecilia, as pope despite not being among the candidates nominated by Gregory. Desiderius, however, refused to accept the tiara, threatening the electors with a return to the monastery. Consul Cencius suggested Cardinal-bishop of Ostia, Otho de Lagery, the only dissenting cardinal, and the only cardinal forced to accept Desiderius' selection. De Lagery's candidacy was, however, met with opposition from one of the cardinals (probably Deusdedit), who referred to old canon law prohibiting the translation of a bishop from one diocese to another.

In this situation, the choice of Desiderius was upheld and he was forced to accept it under the name of Victor III. Four days later, the "Gregorian" fled from Rome to Terracina before the imperial prefect of Rome, a supporter of Clement III. In Terracina, the pope-elect left the papal insignia and retired to Monte Cassino, where he remained in persistent refusal for ten months. It was only in March 1087, at the Synod of Capua, that he accepted his election as head of the Catholic Church. Soon after, the Normans once again removed Antipope Clement III from Rome. On 9 May 1087, Victor III was consecrated and crowned in St Peter's Basilica.
