= Peter Igneus =

Italian Roman Catholic Benedictine monk

Blessed Peter Igneus O.S.B. Vall.
- Cardinal-Bishop of Albano
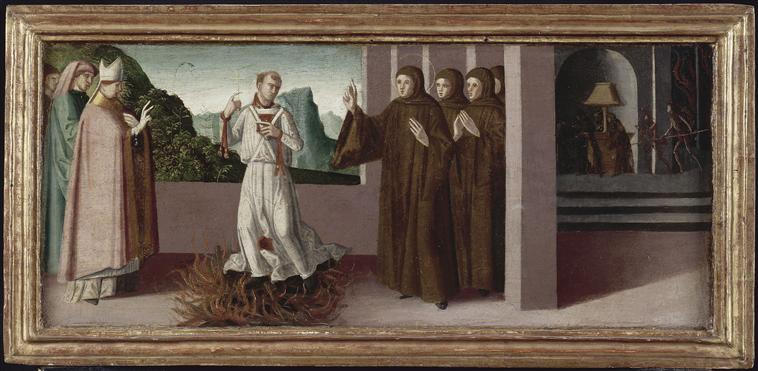
- Peter Igneus over the fire - Marco Palmezzano.
- Church: Roman Catholic Church
- Appointed: 1072
- Term ended: 11 November 1089
- Successor: Nicholas Breakspear

Orders
- Created cardinal: 1072 by Pope Alexander II
- Rank: Cardinal-Bishop

Personal details
- Born: Pietro Igneo Florence, Tuscan Margrave
- Died: 11 November 1089 Albano, Rome, Papal States

Sainthood
- Feast day: 8 February
- Venerated in: Roman Catholic Church
- Beatified: 4 March 1673; Saint Peter's Basilica, Papal States by Pope Clement X
- Attributes: Benedictine habit; Cardinal's attire

Pietro Igneo (died 11 November 1089) was an Italian Roman Catholic Benedictine monk from the Vallombrosians branch. He also served as a cardinal and was named as the Cardinal-Bishop of Albano. He is often referred to as a member of the Aldobrandini house but this familiar denomination is not attested in sources as a fact. He founded the Abbey of Santa Maria in Montepiano in Tuscany.

Igneo's beatification had been confirmed on 4 March 1673.

== Life ==
Pietro Igneo was born to a noble family in Florence. He was a relative to John Gualbert, and the uncle of Bernardo degli Uberti. He had at least one sibling.

Pietro entered the Order of Saint Benedict in 1018 as a monk.

Bishop Pietro Mezzobarbo had been accused of simoniacal acquisition of the episcopal dignities. Mezzobarbo denied these charges to the utmost and had numerous and prominent supporters. This accusation turned into conflict and intense agitation in Florence. The Vallombrosian monks were his chief accusers, and upon the insistence of the people for proof, the judgment of God - or a trial through fire - was resorted to to settle the matter. The abbot (and his relative) John Gualbert designated for the test Pietro, who underwent the ordeal on 23 February 1068 (he succeeded) and was hence called "Igneo" which meant "fire-tried". This triumph of the monks led to a confession on the part of the bishop.

Igneo soon became the abbot for San Salvatore in Fucecchio and he held that position until 1081. In 1072, he was designated as a cardinal and Pope Alexander II named him Cardinal-Bishop of Albano. Igneo attended the October 1072 consecration of the church of Santi Donato e Nicola in Albano, while he himself consecrated the church of San Miniatis in Rubbicana on 7 February 1077.

He cooperated with Pope Gregory VII to repress simony and reform church discipline. Gregory VII entrusted him with several important missions: in 1079, he served as a papal legate in the German kingdom with the Bishop of Padua to mediate between the Emperor Henry IV and Rudolf of Swabia. Upon the renewal of the excommunication against the emperor at Salerno in 1084, he was designated at Pope Gregory VII's behest, as one of the two legates sent to France for the promulgation of the sentence. He is mentioned in the papal bull of Pope Urban II on 8 July 1089 and is attested for the last time in the papal curia in September 1089.

Igneo served as a co-consecrator for the episcopal consecration of the new Pope Victor III in 1087. He participated in the conclaves held in 1086 and in 1088.

He died on 11 November 1089.
