= Museo dell'Opera del Duomo =

Museo dell'Opera del Duomo may refer to:

- The Museo dell'Opera del Duomo (Florence)
- The Museo dell'Opera del Duomo of Pisa
- Prato Cathedral Museum
- The Museo dell'Opera del Duomo (Siena)
