= Abbey of Santa Maria in Montepiano =

11th-century abbey in Tuscany

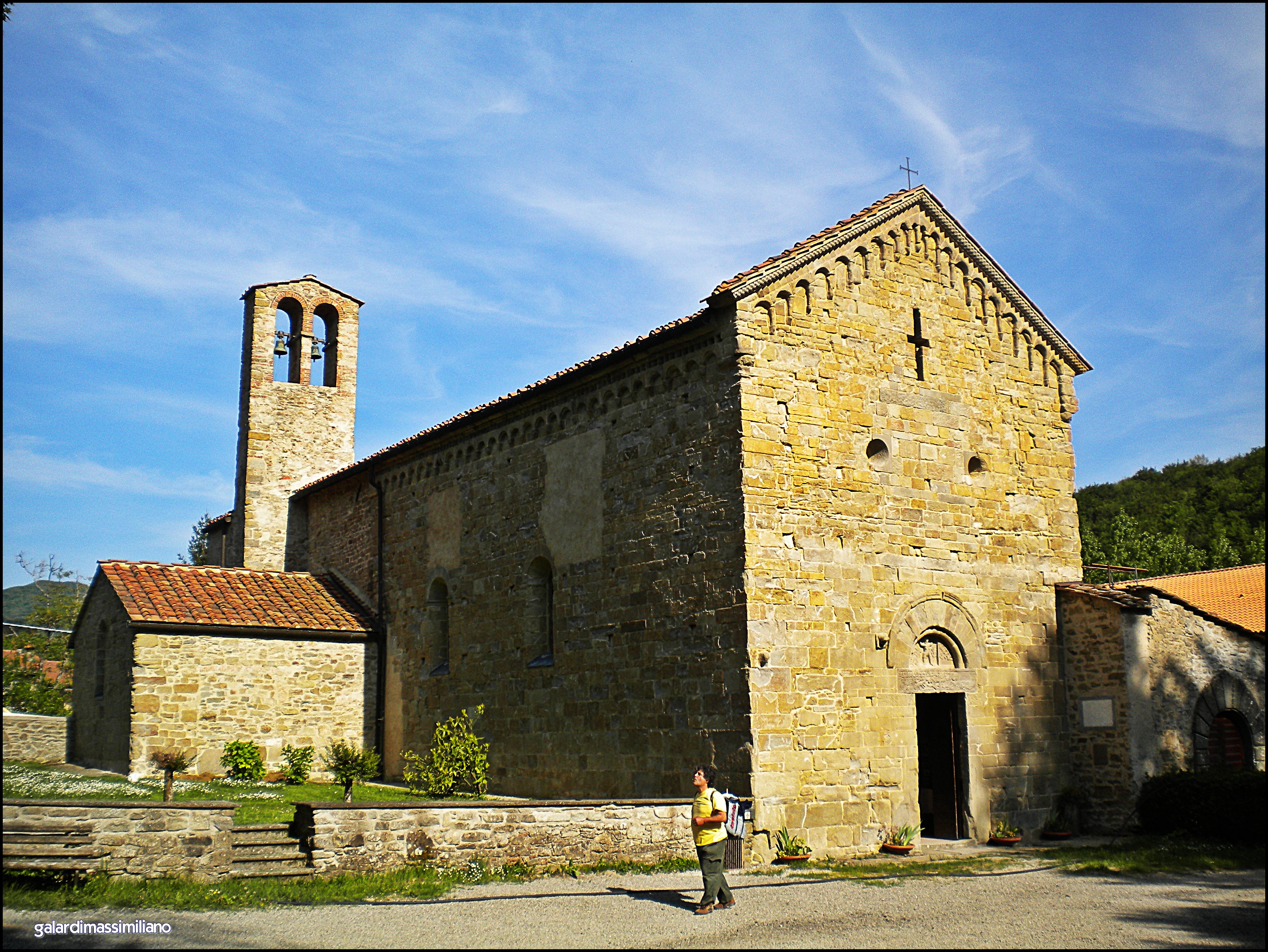
- Facade of the Abbey
- Interactive map of Abbey of Santa Maria in Montepiano

Monastery information
- Order: Benedictine
- Denomination: Catholic
- Established: 1090; 936 years ago
- Dedication: St Mary
- Diocese: Prato

People
- Founder: Blessed Peter Igneus

Architecture
- Designated date: 1107
- Style: Romanesque

Site
- Location: Montepiano, Tuscany
- Country: Italy
- Coordinates: 44°05′36.6″N 11°08′32.8″E
- Public access: yes

The Abbey of Santa Maria in Montepiano is an 11th-century Benedictine abbey in Montepiano, Province of Prato, Italy. It was built in a high mountain pass in the Apennines of Tuscany and features medieval frescoes.

== History ==
The abbey originated as a hermitage founded by Blessed Peter Igneus circa 1090. With the help of the Cadolingi family, a monastic complex developed around the hermitage. The abbey was incorporated into the Vallombrosian Order, a branch of the Benedictines, and consecrated in 1107.

A bell tower was added to the apse in the 15th century. The abbey was temporarily abandoned in the 16th century. Two transepts were transformed into side chapels in the 16th-17th centuries.

After an earthquake in the 19th century, it underwent partial demolition. Some artifacts from the abbey are preserved in the Prato Cathedral Museum.

== Architecture and art ==
The facade of the abbey was built with sandstone from the surrounding region of Vernio in a Romanesque style unique to the Tuscan-Emilian Apennine region. The facade is embellished with a frieze which wraps around the abbey.

The central doorway has a wooden architrave with a bas-relief depicting snakes, vines, lions, and dragons entwined about a central Christian cross, an allusion to Psalms. The wood lunette above the door depicts a highly stylized central female figure with raised arms among tree forms embellished by knots. The architrave and lunette are in an archaic style most common in the 9th century.

The main structure of the abbey consists of a single nave with high ceilings supported by wooden trusses. Medieval frescoes adorn the walls, with a series of three frescoes on the right wall (c. 1260–1280) depicting the Nativity scene, Annunciation, as well as the Archangel Michael.

There is a highly colored portrait of Saint Christopher by a Florentine painter dating to 1270. An inscription under the painting states that Johannes and Goctolus commissioned it, and its detailed drapery suggests Palaeologan origin similar to that in the Madonna del Carmine in the Santa Maria Maggiore in Florence. There is also a late-14th century fresco of the Madonna and child enthroned and flanked by standing figures of Saint Peter and Saint Paul attested to Giroldo.

== Gallery ==
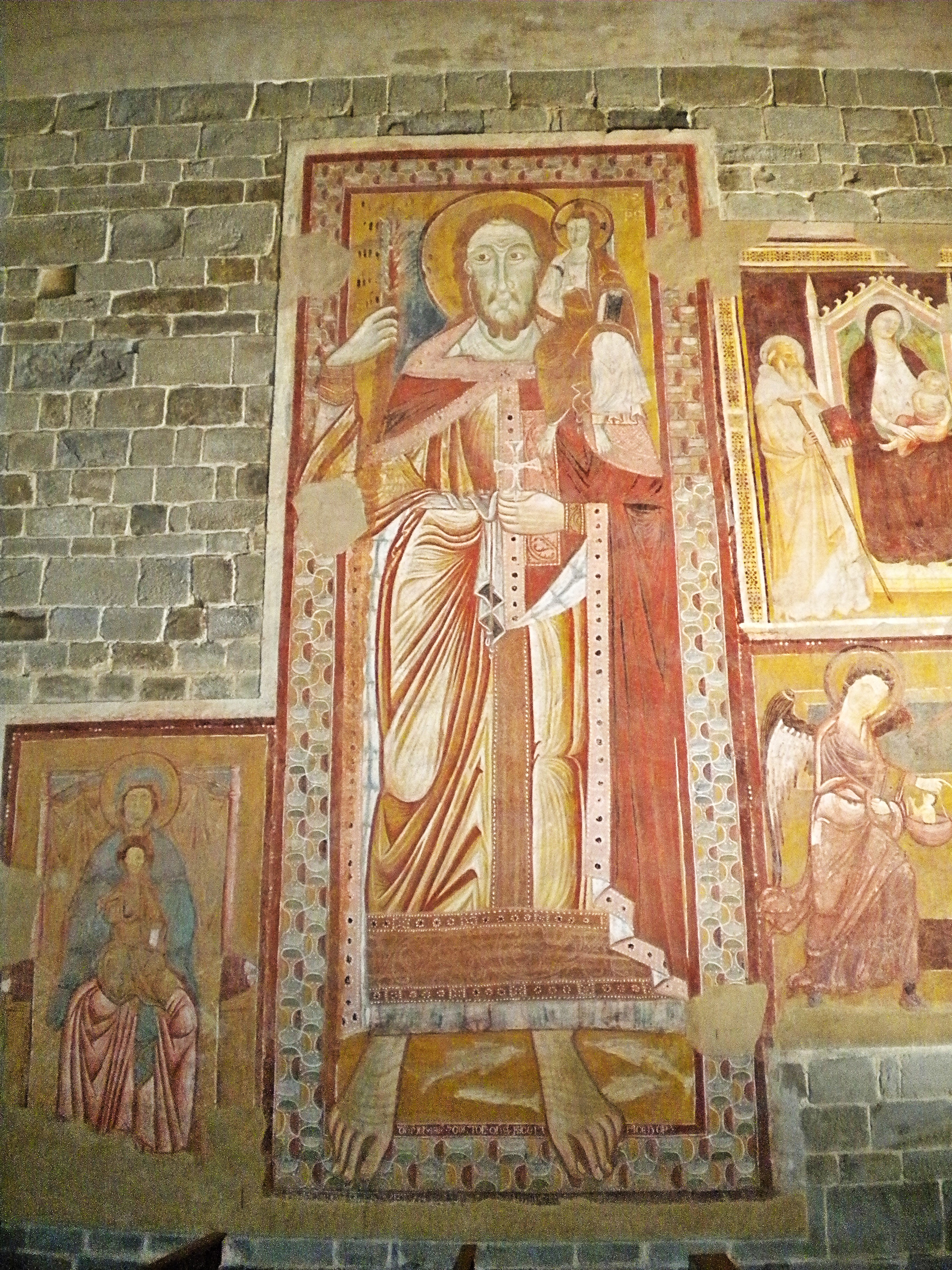
Interior fresco

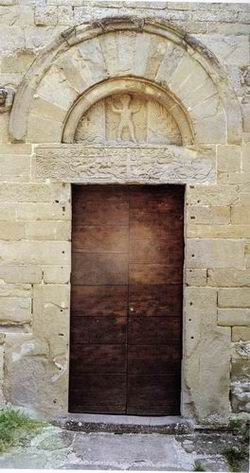
Abbey portal

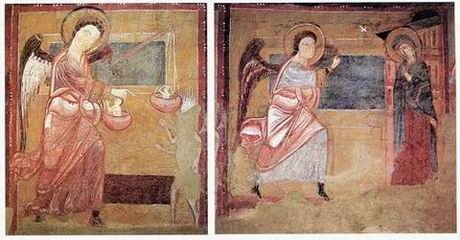
Frescoes of the Annunciation and the Archangel Michael

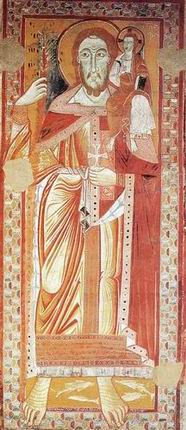
Fresco of Saint Christopher

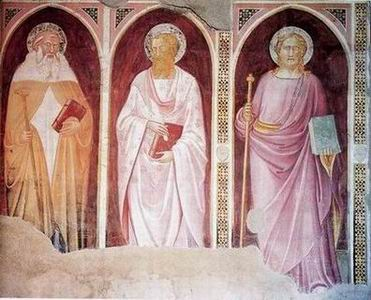
Frescoes depicting saints

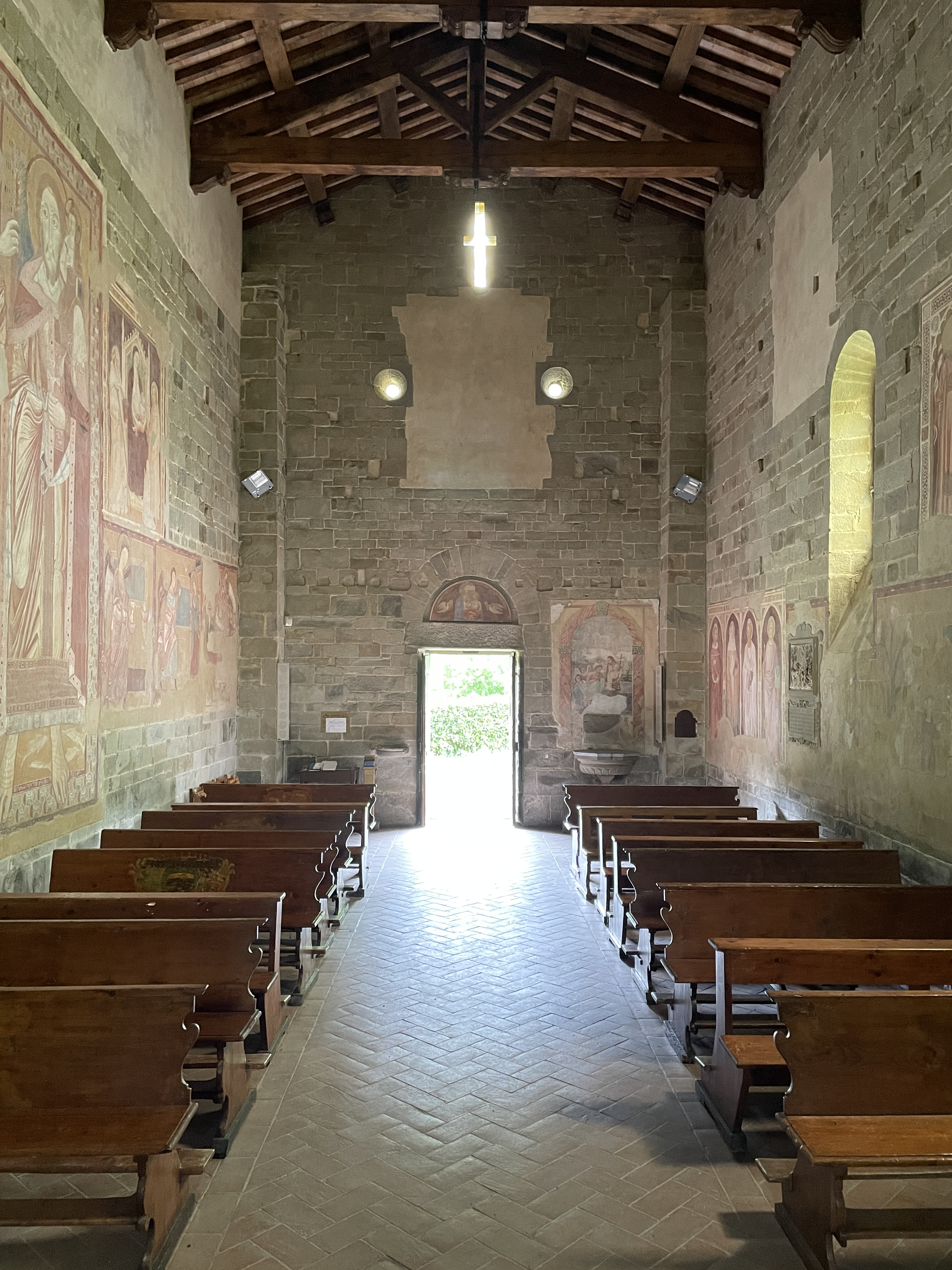
Abbey nave

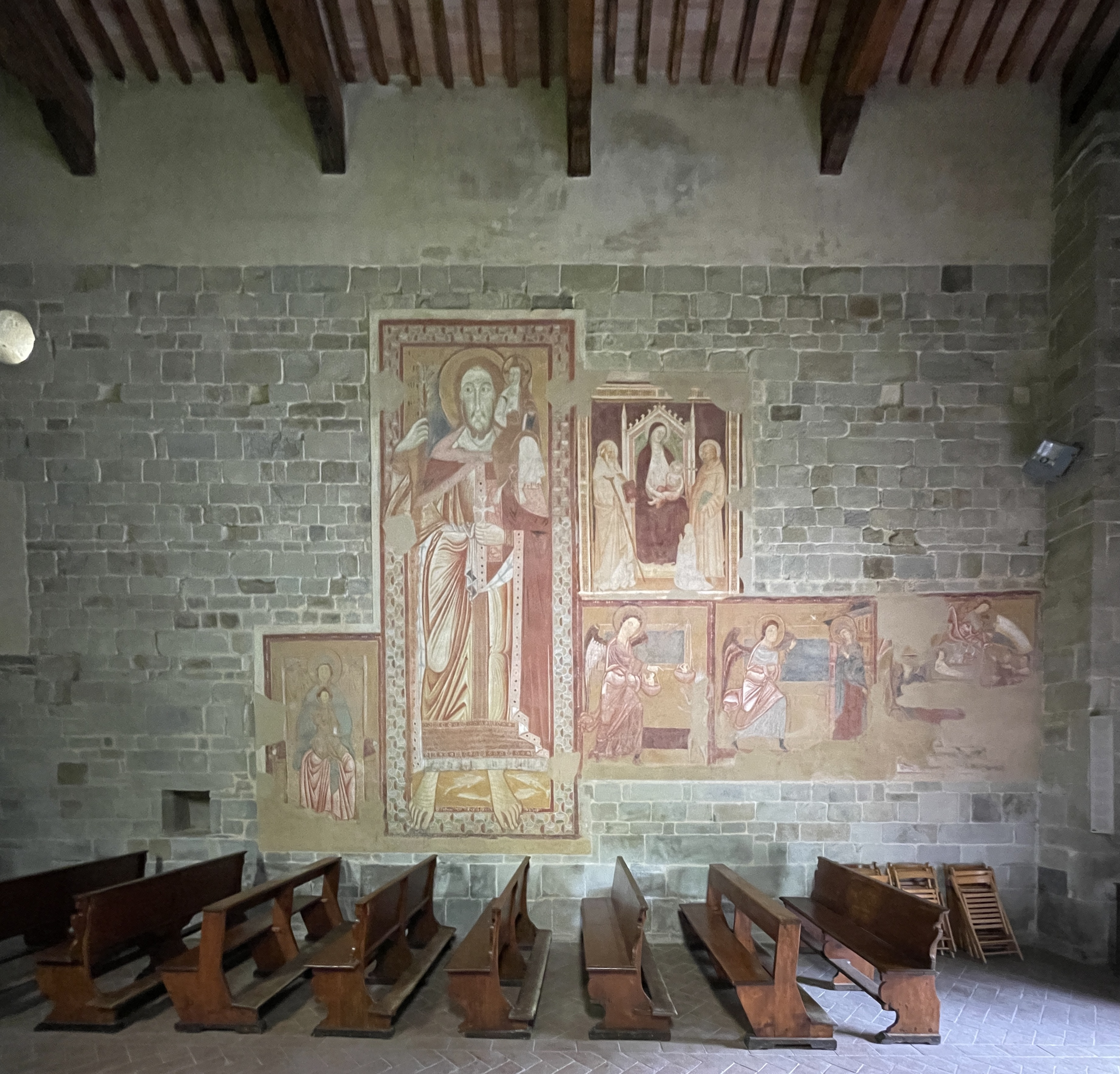
South wall frescoes

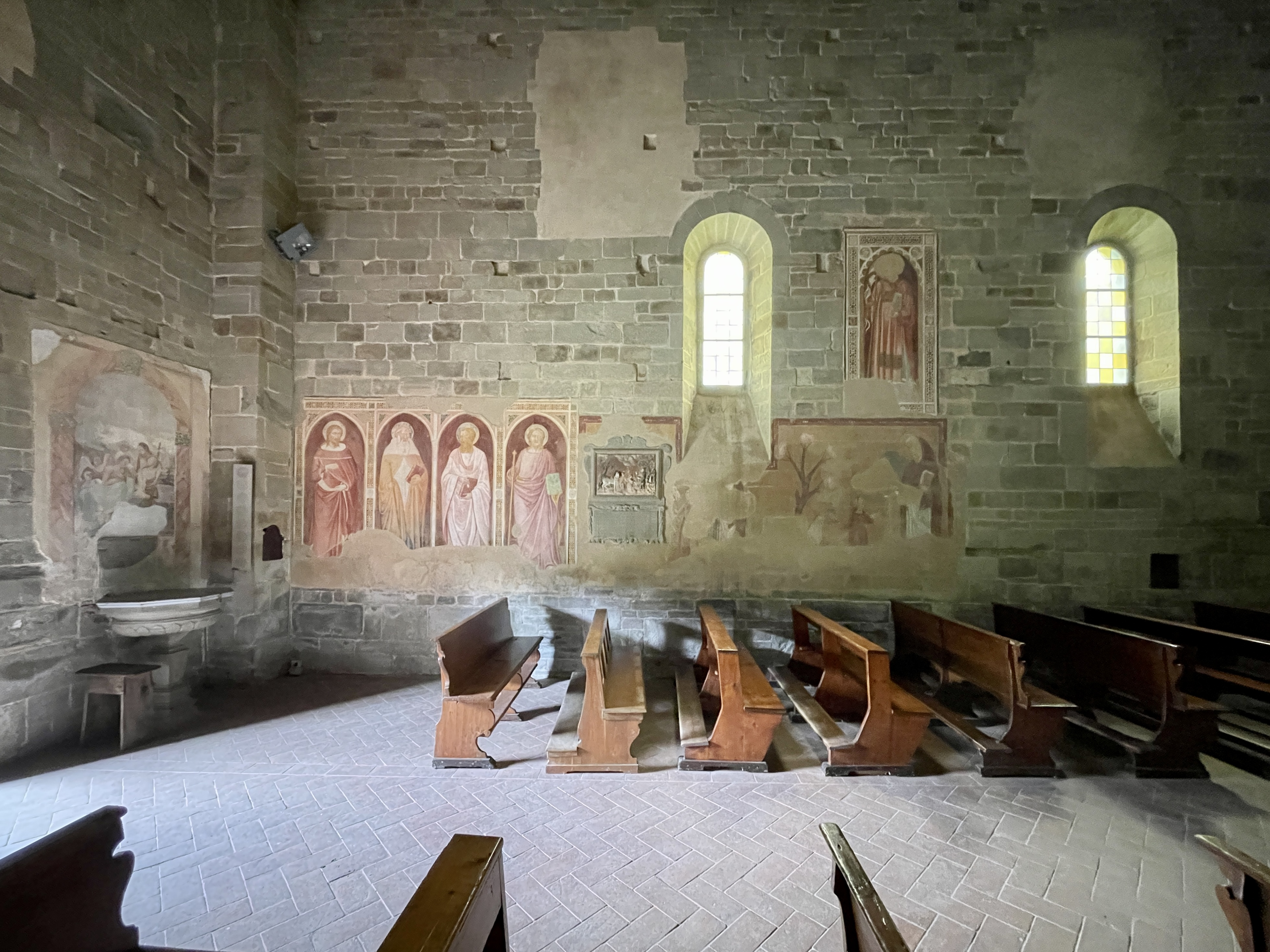
North wall frescoes

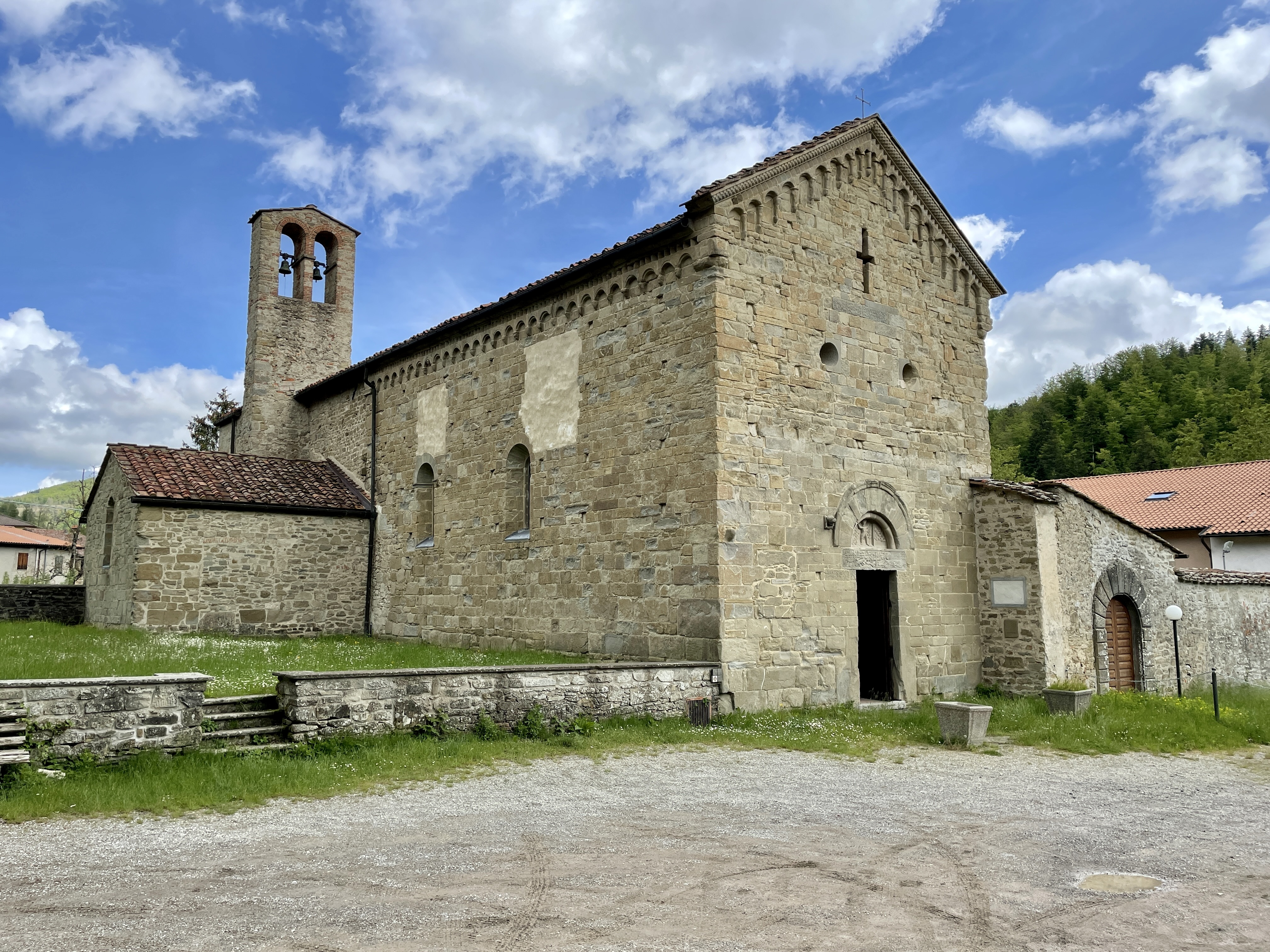
Exterior

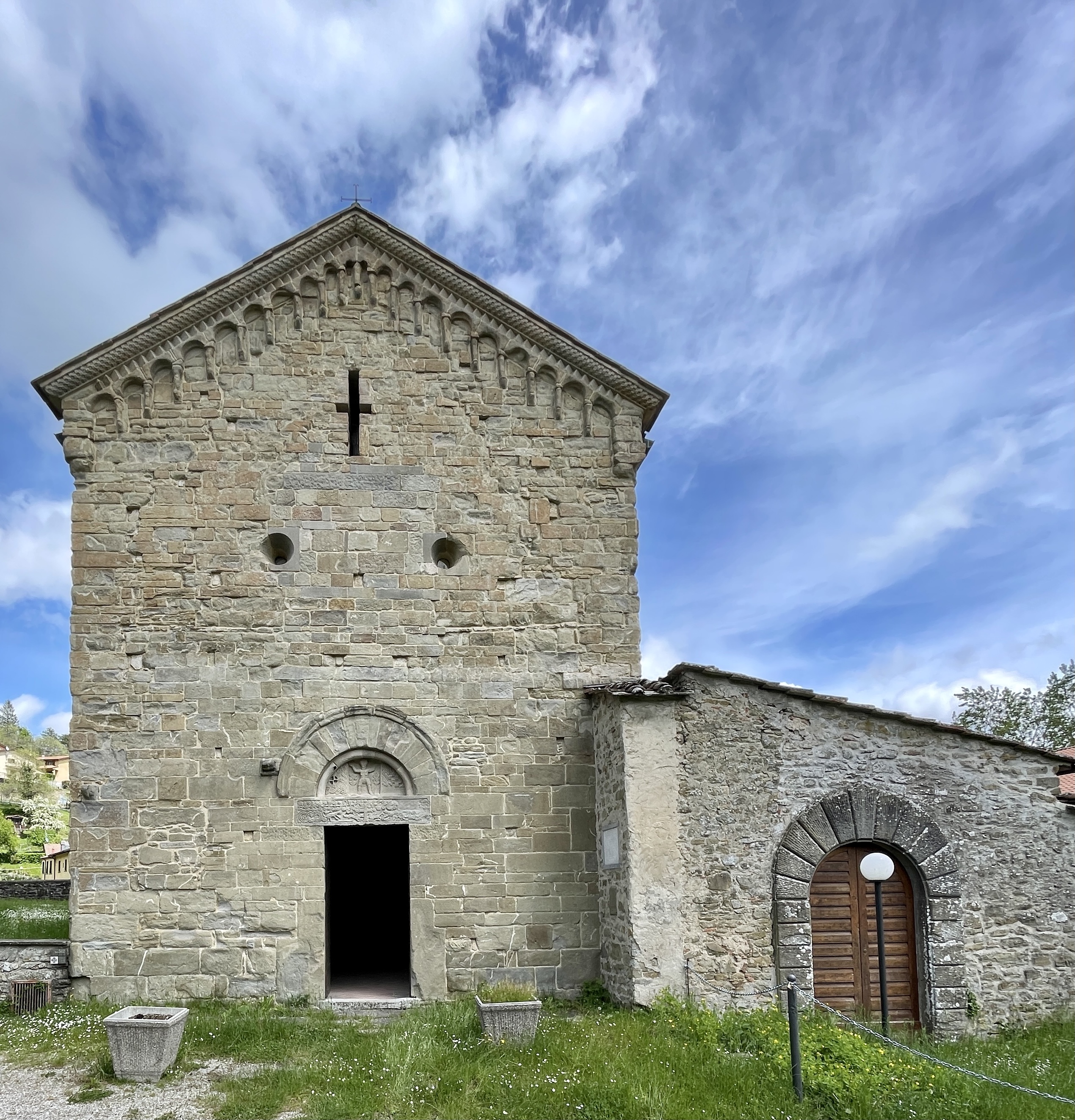
Facade

== See also ==
- Vallombrosians
- Peter Igneus
- Vernio
- Santa Maria Maggiore
