= Vernio =

- Comune
- Comune di Vernio
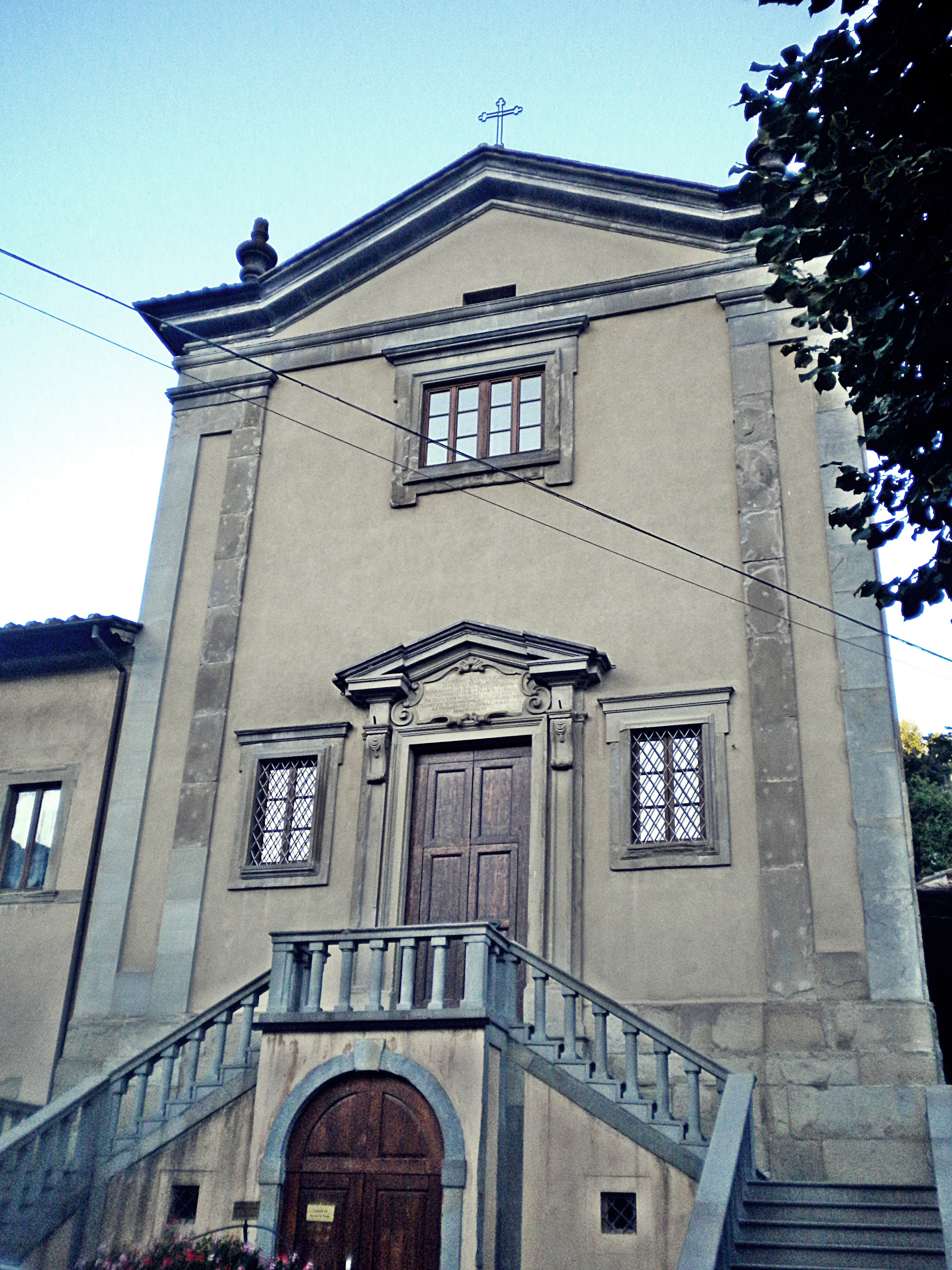
- Oratory of St.Nicholas, in the main village of San Quirico.

- Coat of arms

- Location within Italy Location within Tuscany
- Coordinates: 44°3′N 11°9′E
- Country: Italy
- Region: Tuscany
- Province: Prato (PO)
- Frazioni: Cavarzano, Costozze, Le Confina, Mercatale Vernio, Montepiano, Risubbiani, San Quirico (communal capital), Sant'Ippolito, Sasseta, Terrigoli

Government
  - Mayor: Maria Lucarini (Partito Democratico)

Area
  - Total: 63.38 km^{2} (24.47 sq mi)
- Elevation: 278 m (912 ft)

Population (2025)
  - Total: 6,158
  - Density: 97.16/km^{2} (251.6/sq mi)
- Demonym: Verniatti
- Time zone: UTC+1 (CET)
  - Summer (DST): UTC+2 (CEST)
- Postal code: 59024
- Dialing code: 0574
- Patron saint: St. Leonard of Noblac
- Saint day: 6 November

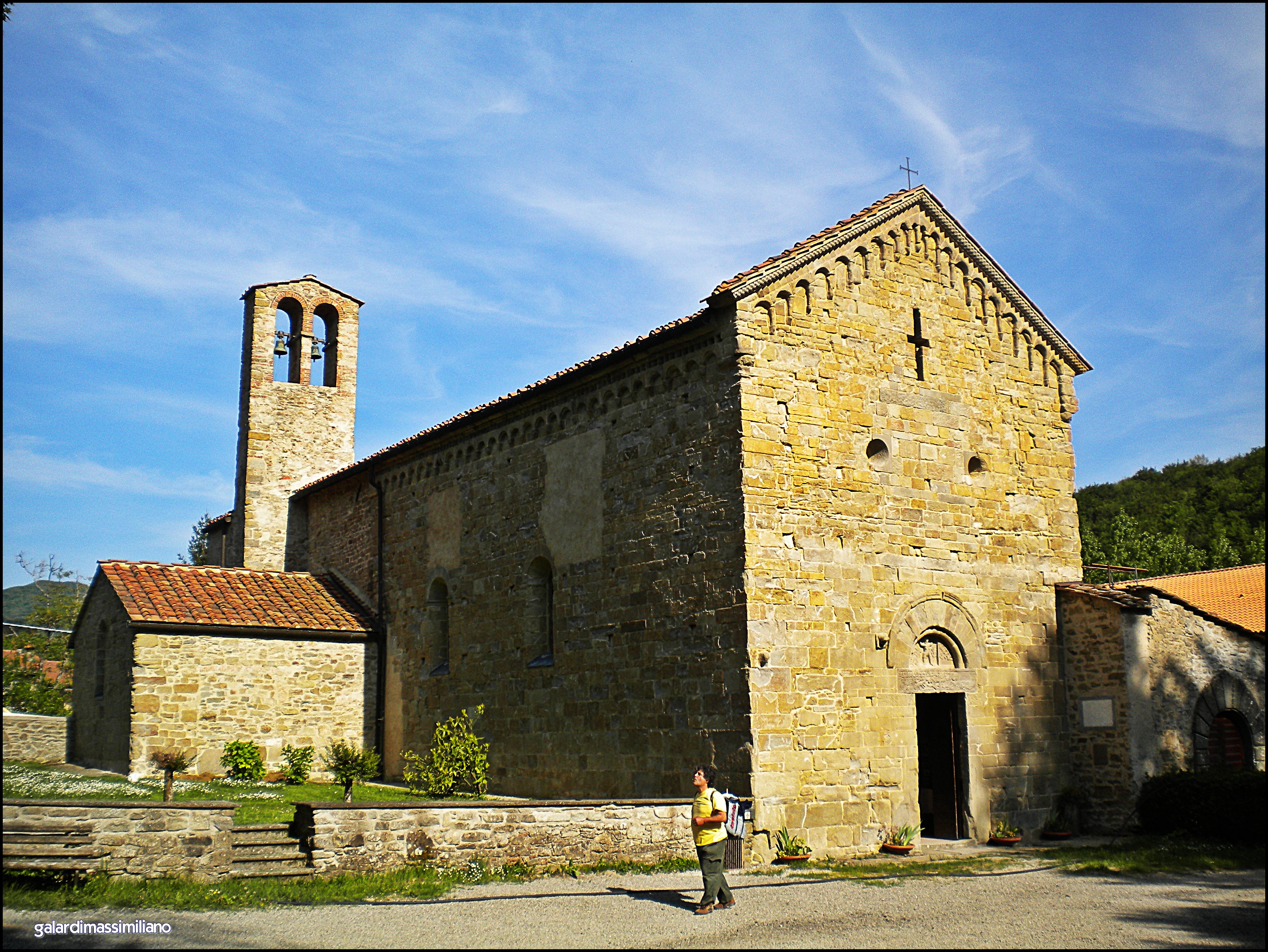
Abbey in Montepiano

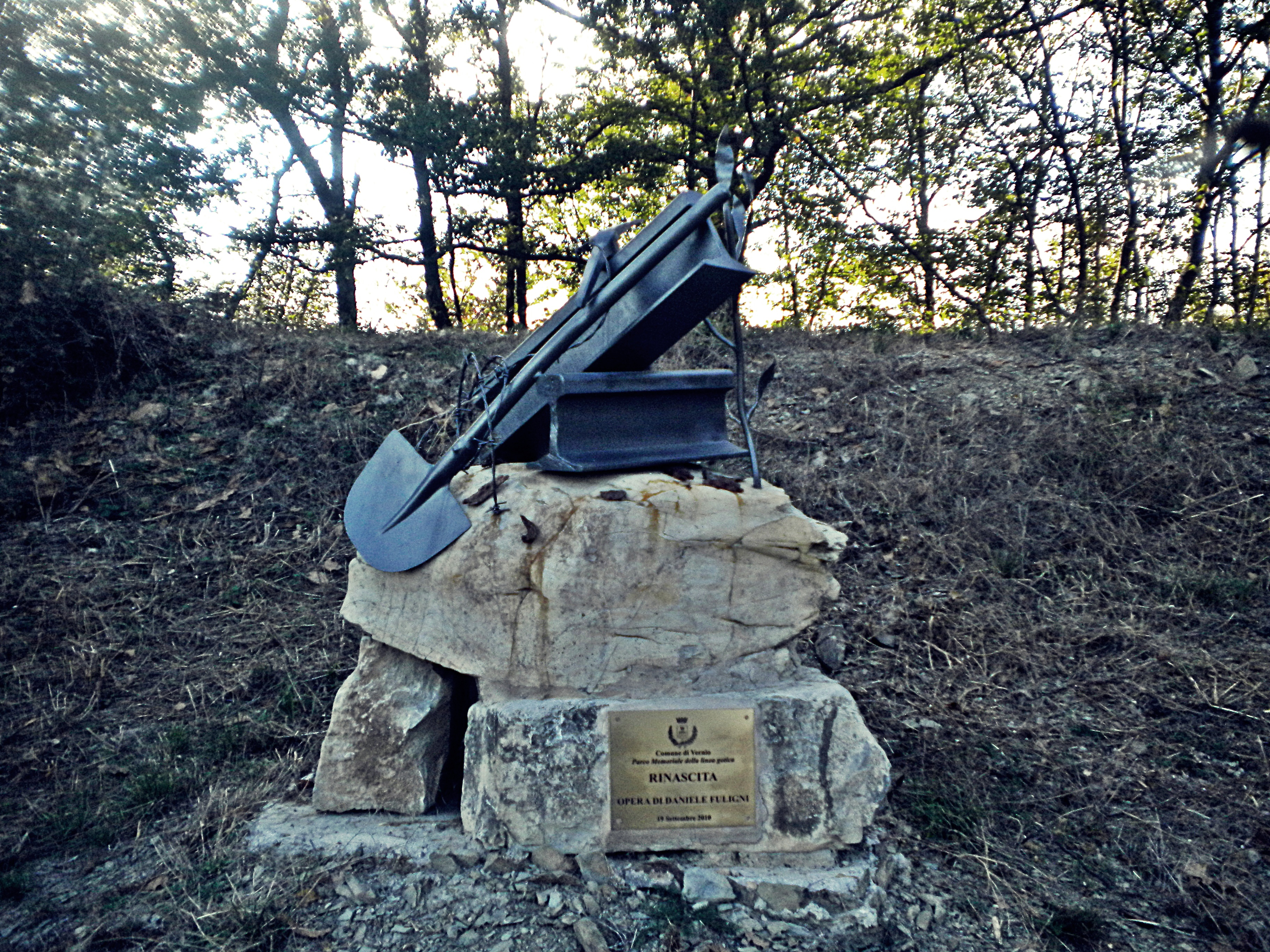
War memorial park of gothic line in La Torricella between Celle (Vernio) and Mangona (Barberino di Mugello)

Vernio is a comune (municipality) in the Province of Prato in the region of Tuscany in Italy, located about 30 kilometres (19 mi) northwest of Florence and about 20 kilometres (12 mi) north of Prato. It has 6,158 inhabitants.

== History ==
Vernio's name derives from that of an ancient Roman winter camp (castra hiberna) located here. A Roman bridge existed in the area, but was destroyed during World War II.

In the 12th century it went from the Carolingians to the counts Alberti from Prato, who lived here after 1107. In the 13th century it went to the Bardi family, as the seat of a county which remained independent until 1798, when it was abolished by Napoleon. After the Congress of Vienna it was annexed to the Grand Duchy of Tuscany.

On 7 June 1944 an American B-25J mitchell bomber was shot down by German anti-aircraft fire over the hills of Vernio. With four 1,000 pound bombs on board, the plane erupted and crashed in the Carbonale woods, in Poggiole, Vernio. Six of the seven men on board perished. The sole survivor parachuted out of the plane and hid in the mountains before making it back to allied lines in Florence three months later. The fallen crew were buried in the cemetery in Montepiano shortly after the crash, their final resting place at Fort Sam Houston, Texas, USA.

In the winter of 2013, the pilot's military tag was found in the woods, and brought to the local museum. The museum hosts an exhibit of the B-25J mitchell consisting of parts of the plane found through metal detecting and also donated by locals. A monument at the crash site was built by the museum and unveiled at the 70th anniversary memorial event on 7 June 2014. A book was written about the crew and events surrounding the incident, presented at the city hall in downtown Vernio also on the 70th anniversary.

== Geography ==
Vernio borders the following municipalities: Barberino di Mugello, Camugnano, Cantagallo, Castiglione dei Pepoli.

The municipality of Vernio is a union of three villages:

- San Quirico (with the town hall)
- Mercatale with the Vernio-Cantagallo-Montepiano train station
- Sant'Ippolito (with a nice parish church)

=== Villages ===
- Cavarzano
- Celle di Vernio
- Ceraio
- Costozze
- Gavazzoli
- Gorandaccio
- La Rocca di Vernio
- La Storaia
- La Valle di Vernio
- Le Confina
- Luciana di Verrio
- Mercatale di Vernio
- Montepiano
- Poggiole
- San Quirico di Vernio
- Sant'Ippolito di Vernio
- Sasseta
- Segalari
- Terrigoli

== Demographics ==
Historical population

Year	Pop.	±%
1861	4,361	—
1871	4,547	+4.3%
1881	4,741	+4.3%
1901	4,098	−13.6%
1911	7,202	+75.7%
1921	8,489	+17.9%
1931	8,963	+5.6%
1936	7,853	−12.4%

Year	Pop.	±%
1951	7,871	+0.2%
1961	7,469	−5.1%
1971	6,339	−15.1%
1981	5,685	−10.3%
1991	5,464	−3.9%
2001	5,535	+1.3%
2011	6,012	+8.6%
2021	6,066	+0.9%

Source: ISTAT

== Main sights ==
The main sight is the Abbey of Santa Maria in Montepiano (11th century), housing 13th-century frescoes.

=== Churches ===
- Sant'Agata chapel in La Rocca
- Former oratory of the Company of Jesus in Sant'Ippolito
- Madonna della Neve in Sasseta
- San Pietro in Cavarzano
- Sanctuary of Sant'Antonio Maria Pucci
- San Bartolomeo in Costozze
- San Martino in Luciana
- San Michele in Sasseta
- San Niccolò oratory in San Quirico
- San Quirico e Leonardo in San Quirico
- Sant'Antonio da Padova in Mercatale
- Sant'Ippolito e Cassiano in Sant'Ippolito
- Abbey of Santa Maria in Montepiano

=== Nature ===
- La Torricella
- Alpe di Cavarzano

== Feasts ==
- Carnevalino (Carnival) in Sant'Ippolito, the Saturday immediately after Ash Wednesday. A traditional plate (pasta with tuna sauce) is served to the participants, accompanied with herrings.
- Festa della polenta (polenta feast), also called Pulendina, at San Quirico, the first Sunday of Lent: it remembers an episode happened during the 16th century, when the county of Vernio was hit by a famine, after which the Bardi counts ordered an extraordinary distribution of sweet polenta (made by chestnut flour), herrings and cods to the people.
- Fiera di San Giuseppe (St. Joseph Fair) at San Quirico, on 19 March or the weekend immediately after this date.
- Montepiano Country, July
- Madonna delle Neve feast in Sasseta, 5 August.
- Rificolona feast in Montepiano, August

== Twin towns ==
- Senones, France
- Jettingen, Germany
- Marchin, Belgium
