= Montepiano =

Village in Tuscany, Italy

Coordinates: 44°05′28″N 11°09′37″E

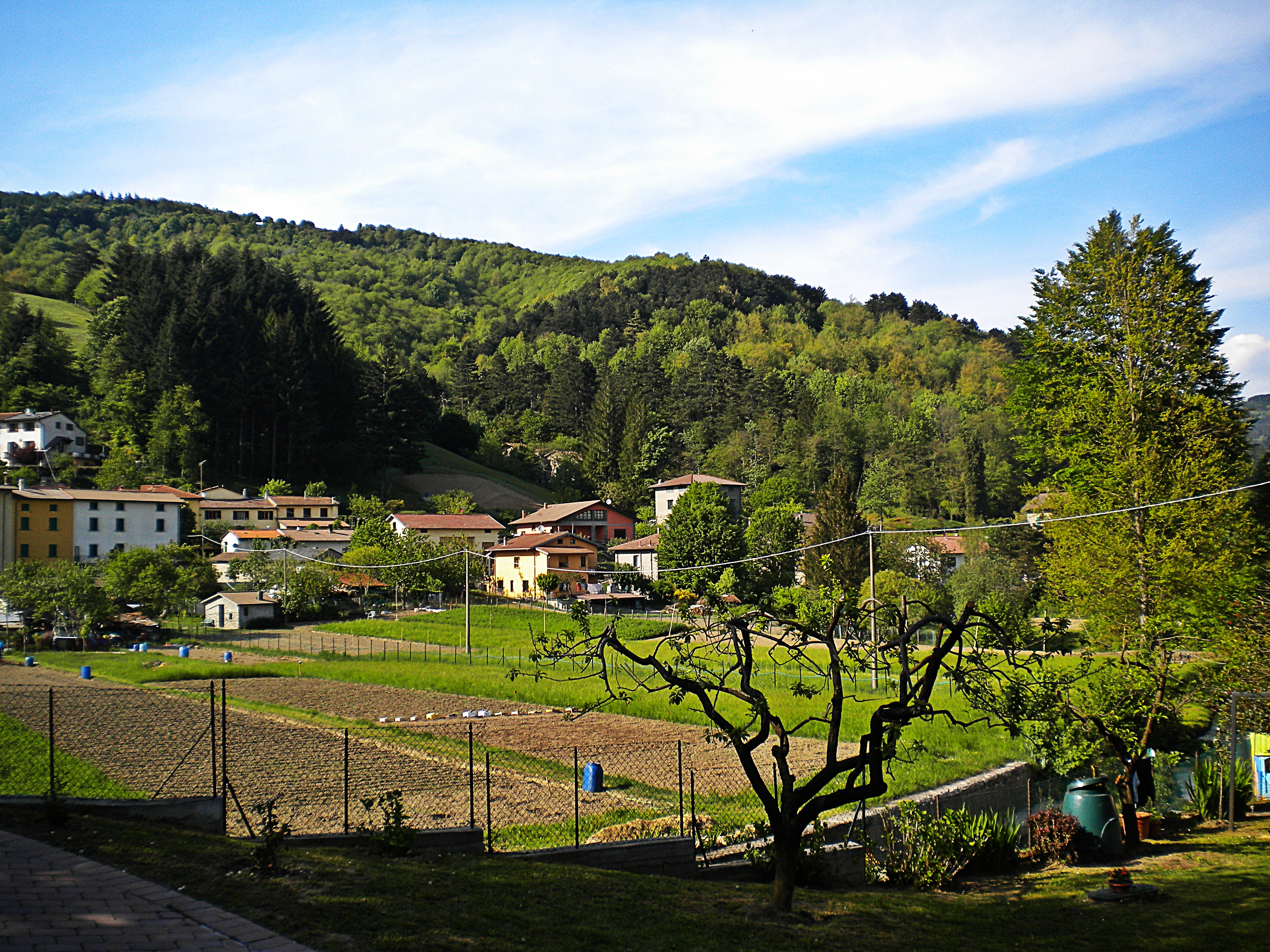
Montepiano

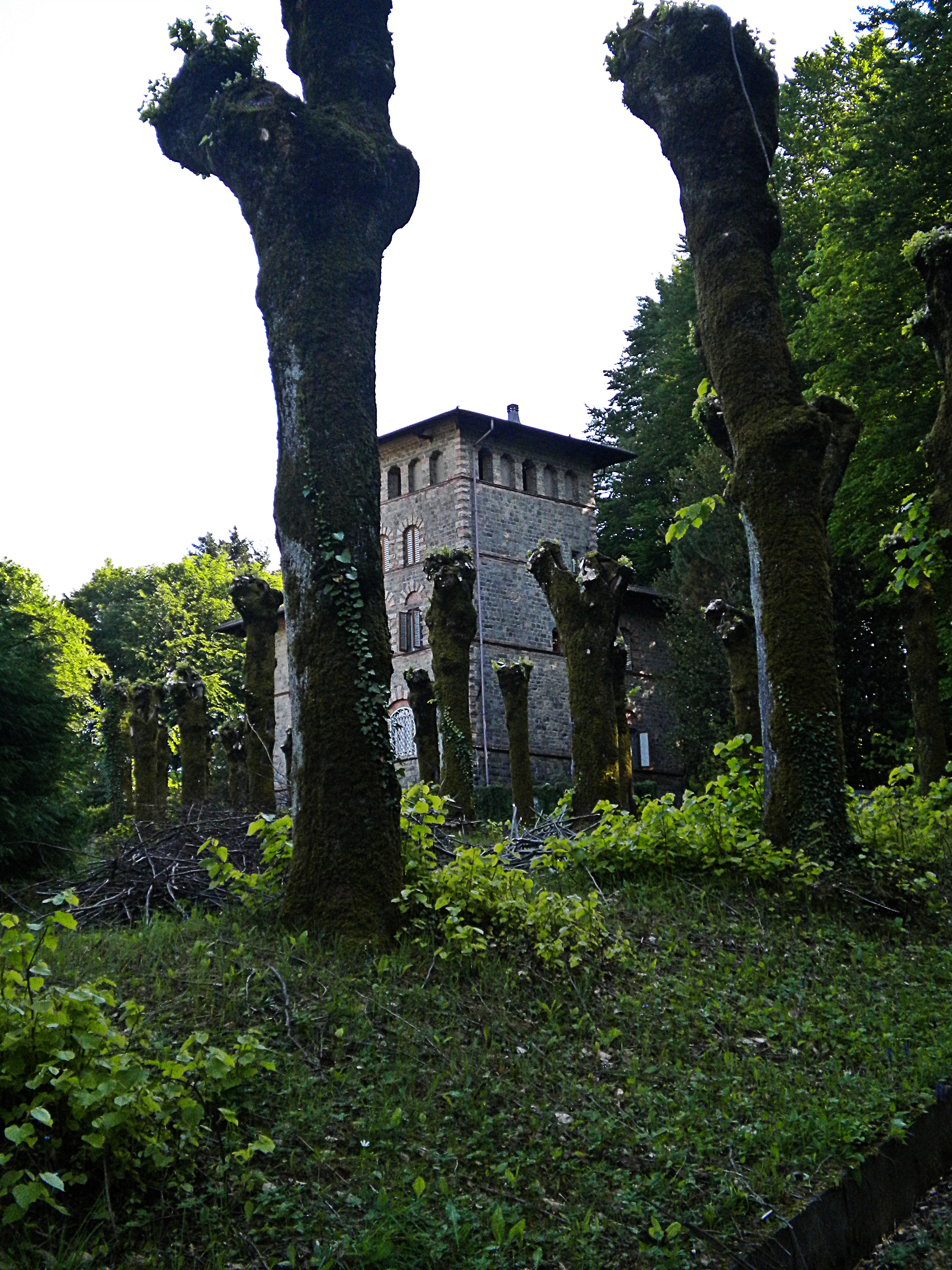
Villa Sperling

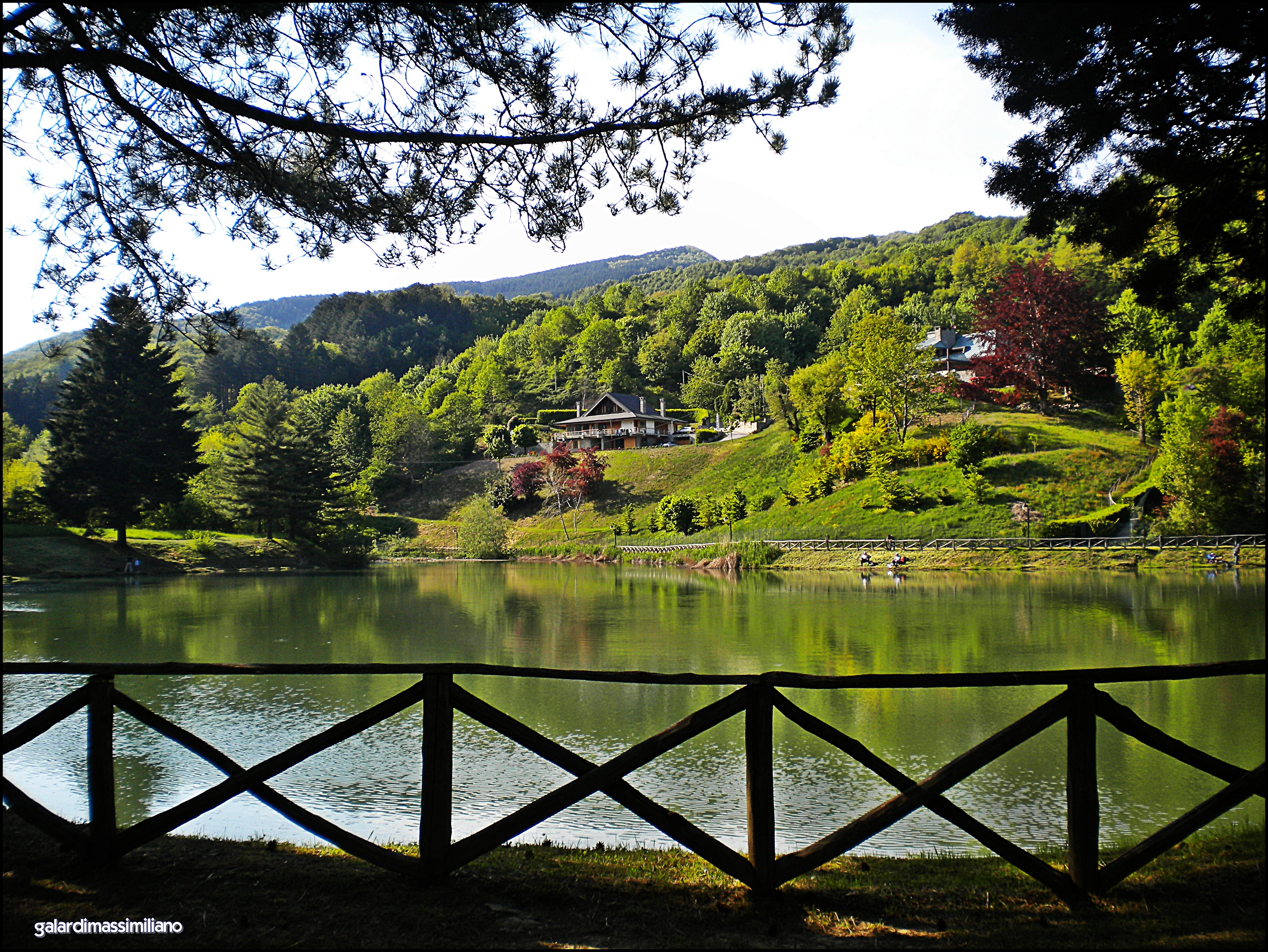
Fiorenzo Lake

Montepiano is a village built in a pass in the Apennine Mountains at 800 m above sea level in the municipality of Vernio in the Italian region of Tuscany. The village has a population of 600, but due to tourism the population triples during the summer. It is common for people living in the nearby city of Prato to have summer homes in Montepiano.

== Overview ==
Montepiano has two churches, the Abbey of Santa Maria in Montepiano and Santa Maria church. Nearby Lake Fiorenzo is often used for fishing. The town is located in the Setta Valley near Emilia-Romagna and the motorway exits of Roncobilaccio and Pian del Voglio. Montepiano hosts an annual sports event called Da Piazza a Piazza. Near the village other little localities, part of Montepiano, such as Risubbiani, La Storaia, Castagnaccio and Mulinaccio. Villa Sperling and Villa Principessa Strozzi are located nearby.

== Gallery ==
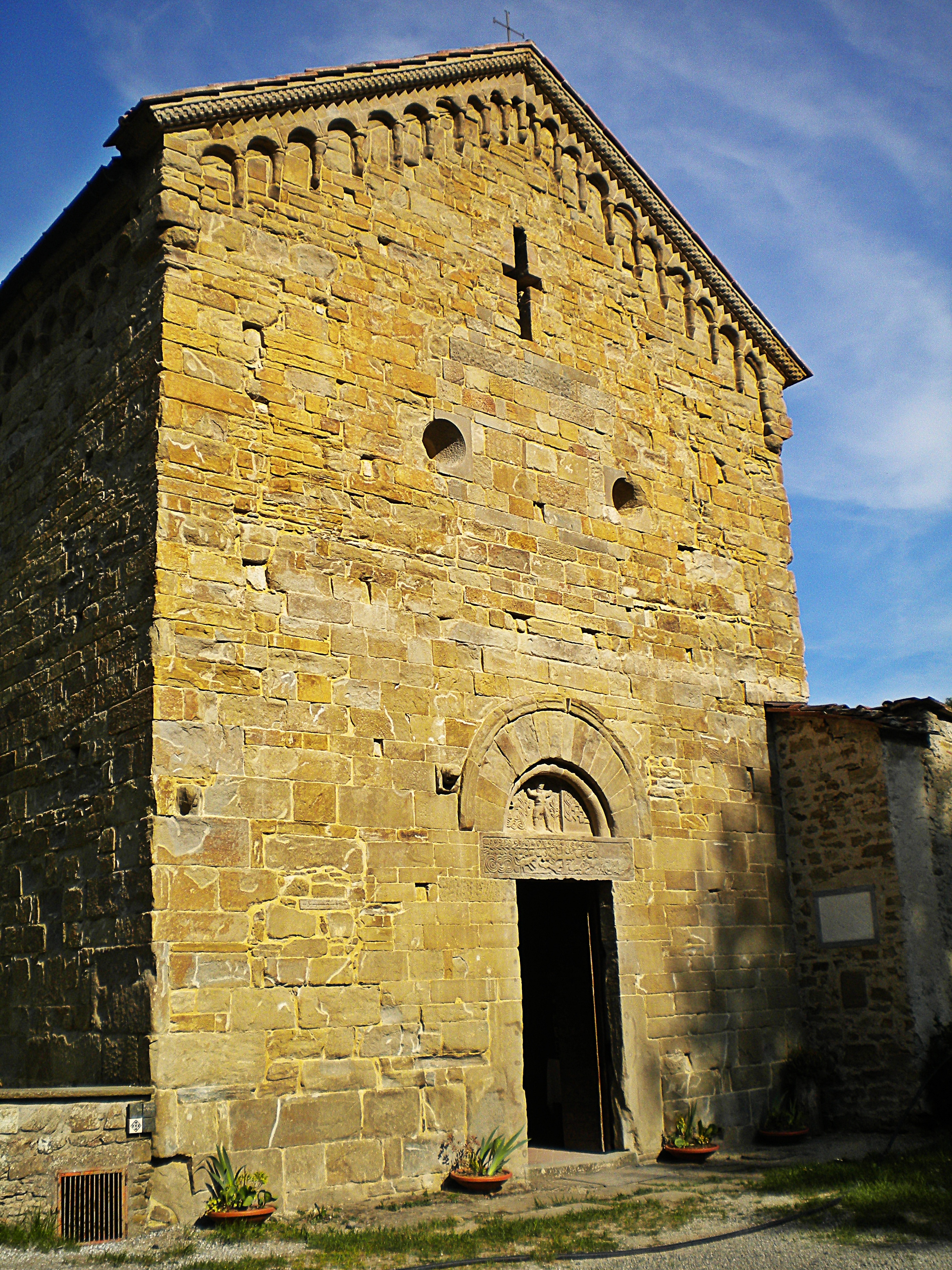
Abbey of Santa Maria-Facade

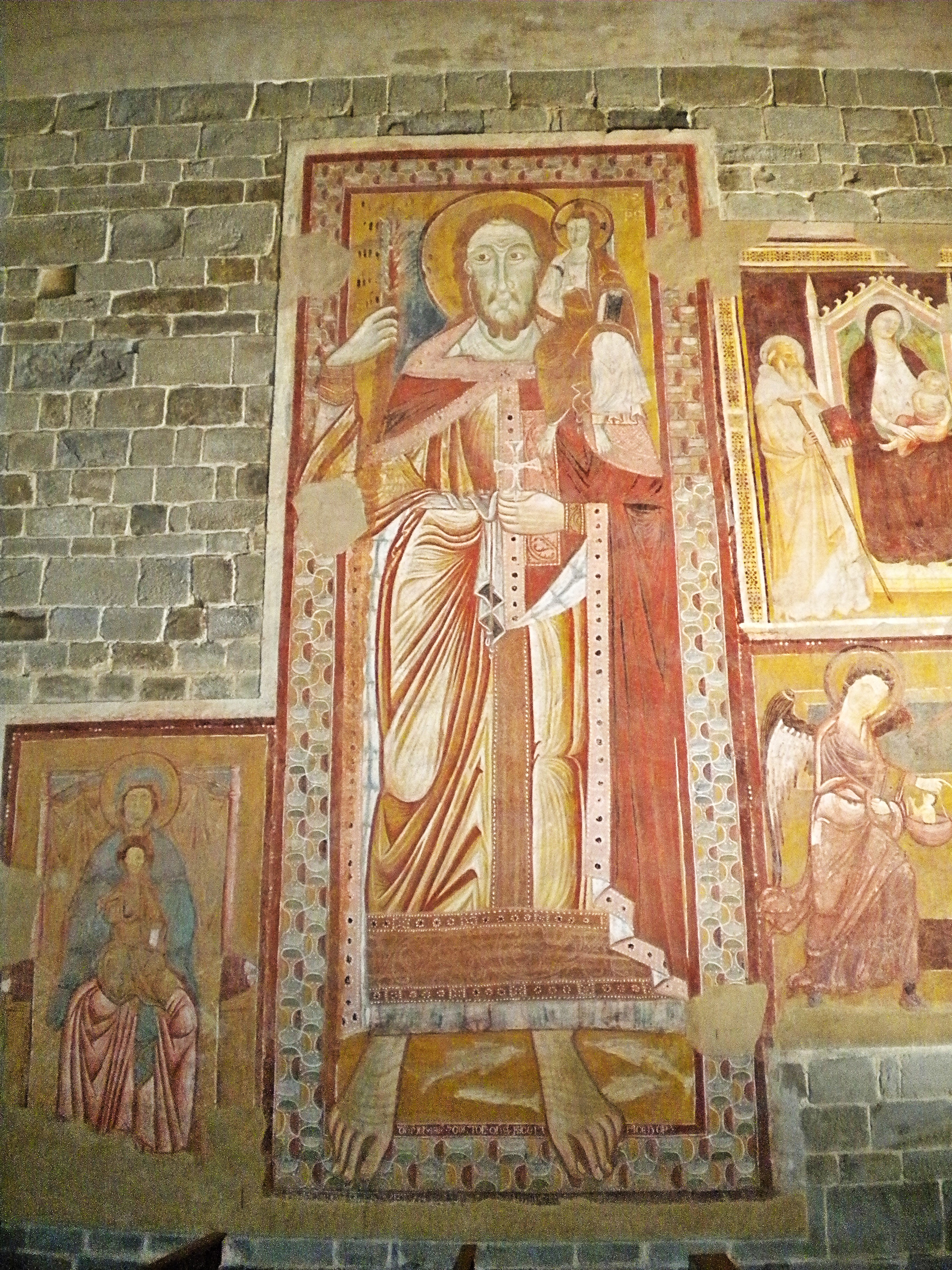
Abbey of Santa Maria-Fresco in the interior

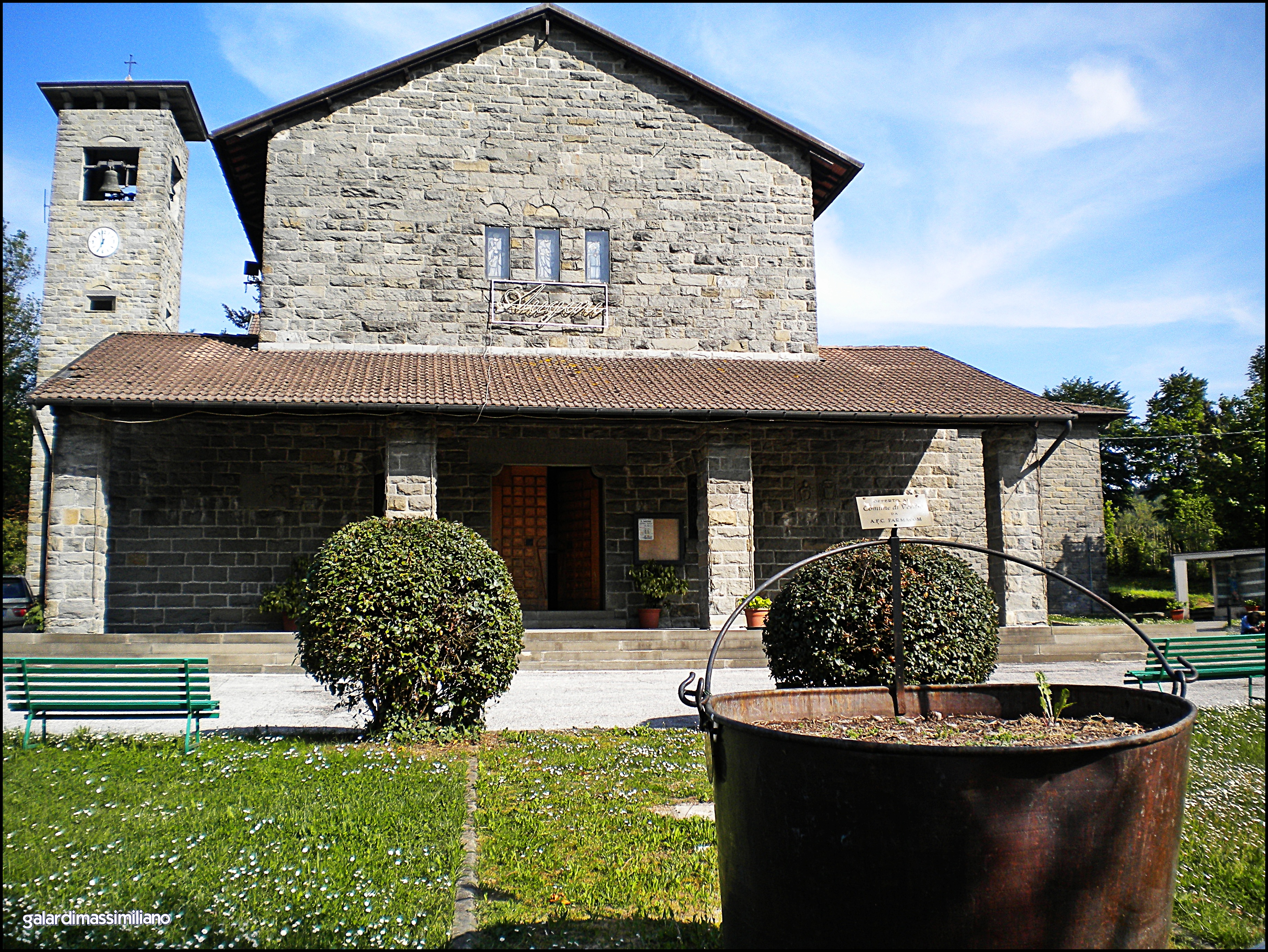
Santa maria church
