= Deusdedit of San Pietro in Vincoli =

Italian Roman Catholic cardinal

Deusdedit (died between 1097 and 1100) was the cardinal-priest of San Pietro in Vincoli (Sanctus Petrus ad Vincula).

Born at Todi, he was a friend of Pope Gregory VII and defender of his reformation measures. Deusdedit joined the Benedictine Order and became a zealous promoter of ecclesiastical reforms in the latter half of the eleventh century.
