= Pope Victor III =

Head of the Catholic Church from 1086 to 1087

Pope Blessed Victor III
- Bishop of Rome
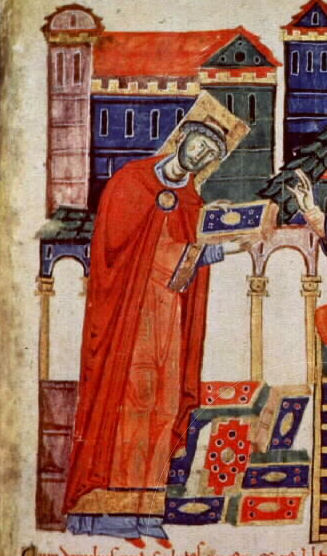
- Desiderius of Montecassino in a contemporary manuscript
- Church: Catholic Church
- Papacy began: 24 May 1086
- Papacy ended: 16 September 1087
- Predecessor: Gregory VII
- Successor: Urban II
- Previous posts: Cardinal-Deacon of Santi Sergio e Bacco (1058–59); Abbot of Montecassino (1058–59); Cardinal-Priest of Santa Cecilia (1059–86); Legate to Constantinople (1059)

Orders
- Consecration: 9 May 1087 by Otho de Lagery
- Created cardinal: 6 March 1058 by Pope Nicholas II
- Rank: Cardinal Deacon (1058 - 1059) Cardinal Priest (1059 - 1086)

Personal details
- Born: Dauferio Epifani Del Zotto c. 1026 Benevento, Duchy of Benevento
- Died: 16 September 1087 (aged c. 61) Monte Cassino, Papal States, Holy Roman Empire

Sainthood
- Feast day: 16 September (Roman Martyrology); 16 October (Roman Proper)
- Venerated in: Catholic Church
- Beatified: 23 July 1887; Rome, Kingdom of Italy by Pope Leo XIII
- Attributes: Papal vestments; Papal tiara; Crozier
- Patronage: Montecassino; Abbots

Pope Victor III (c. 1026 – 16 September 1087), born Dauferio Epifani Del Zotto, was the head of the Catholic Church and ruler of the Papal States from 24 May 1086 to his death. He was the successor of Pope Gregory VII. Prior to becoming pope he had held the important post of abbot of the great monastery of Montecassino, under his monastic name of Desiderius and during those years played a historically important role.

He is the most recent lawfully elected pope to have taken the pontifical name "Victor". (Note: Two antipopes, Gregorio dei Conti in 1138 and Octavianus from 1159 to 1164, both took the style Victor IV but neither has ever been recognised as a lawful pope.)

In contrast with his early public life, as Pope Victor, as he had become, he made a less significant contribution. His failing health was the chief factor that made him so reluctant to accept election as pope and that his health was in fact seriously impaired was clear when he fell ill during the ceremony of his coronation as pope.

== Family ==
Daufer was born in c. 1026. The Catholic Encyclopedia states his father died in 1047 in battle. He obtained permission to enter the monastery of St. Sophia at Benevento.

== Abbacy ==
The life at St. Sophia was not strict enough for the young monk, who betook himself first to the island monastery of Tremite San Nicolo in the Adriatic and in 1053 to the hermits at Majella in the Abruzzi. About this time he was brought to the notice of Pope Leo IX, and it is probable that the pope employed him at Benevento to negotiate peace with the Normans after the fatal battle of Civitate.

Somewhat later Desiderius attached himself to the court of Pope Victor II at Florence. There he met two monks of the renowned Benedictine monastery of Monte Cassino, with whom he returned in 1055. He joined the community and was shortly afterwards appointed superior of the dependent house at Capua. In 1057 Pope Stephen IX, who had retained the abbacy of Monte Cassino, came to visit and at Christmas, believing himself to be dying, ordered the monks to elect a new abbot. Their choice fell on Desiderius. The pope recovered, and, desiring to retain the abbacy during his lifetime, appointed the abbot-designate his legate for Constantinople. It was at Bari, when about to sail for the East, that the news of the pope's death reached Desiderius. Having obtained a safe-conduct from Robert Guiscard, the Norman Count (later Duke) of Apulia, he returned to his monastery and was duly installed by Cardinal Humbert on Easter Day 1058.

Pope Nicholas II elevated him into the cardinalate as the Cardinal-Deacon of Santi Sergio e Bacco on 6 March 1058. He opted to be the Cardinal-Priest of Santa Cecilia in 1059.

Desiderius rebuilt the church and conventual buildings, perfected the products of the scriptorium and re-established monastic discipline, so that there were 200 monks in the monastery in his day. On 1 October 1071, the new Basilica of Monte Cassino was consecrated by Pope Alexander II. Desiderius' reputation brought gifts and exemptions to the abbey. The money was spent on church ornaments, including a great golden altar front from Constantinople adorned with gems and enamels and "nearly all the church ornaments of Victor II, which had been pawned here and there throughout the city". Peter the Deacon gives a list of some seventy books Desiderius had copied at Monte Cassino, including works of Augustine of Hippo, Ambrose, Bede, Basil of Caesarea, Jerome, Gregory of Nazianzus and Cassian, the histories of Josephus, Paul Warnfrid, Jordanes and Gregory of Tours, the Institutes and Novels of Justinian, the works of Terence, Virgil and Seneca, Cicero's De natura deorum, and Ovid's Fasti.

Desiderius had been appointed papal vicar for Campania, Apulia, Calabria and the Principality of Beneventum with special powers for the reform of monasteries. So great was his reputation with the Holy See that he "...was allowed by the Roman Pontiff to appoint Bishops and Abbots from among his Benedictine brethren in whatever churches or monasteries he desired, of those that had lost their patron".

Within two years of the consecration of the Cassinese Basilica, Alexander II died and was succeeded by Hildebrand as Pope Gregory VII. Desiderius was able to call forth the help of the Normans of southern Italy repeatedly in favour of the Holy See. Already in 1059 he had persuaded Robert Guiscard and Richard of Capua to become vassals of St. Peter for their newly conquered territories: now Gregory VII immediately after his election sent for him to give an account of the state of Norman Italy and entrusted him with the negotiation of an interview with Robert Guiscard on 2 August 1073, at Benevento. In 1074 and 1075 he acted as intermediary, probably as Gregory's agent, between the Norman princes themselves, and even when the latter were at open war with the pope, they still maintained the best relations with Monte Cassino. At the end of 1080 Desiderius obtained Norman troops for Gregory. In 1082 he visited the Italian king and future Holy Roman Emperor Henry IV at Albano, while the troops of the Imperialist antipope Clement III were harassing the pope from Tivoli. In 1083 the peace-loving abbot joined Hugh of Cluny in an attempt to reconcile pope and emperor, and his proceedings seem to have aroused some suspicion in Gregory's entourage. In 1084, when Rome was in Henry's hands and the pope besieged in Castel Sant'Angelo, Desiderius announced the approach of Guiscard's army to both emperor and pope.

== Papacy ==
Though certainly a strong partisan of the Hildebrandine reforms, Desiderius belonged to the moderate party and could not always see eye-to-eye with Pope Gregory VII in his most intransigent proceedings. Yet when the latter lay dying at Salerno on 25 May 1085, the Abbot of Monte Cassino was one of those whom he recommended to the cardinals of southern Italy as fittest to succeed him. The Roman people had expelled the Antipope Clement III from the city, and hither Desiderius hastened to consult with the cardinals on the approaching election. Finding, however, that they were bent on forcing the papal dignity upon him, he fled to Monte Cassino, where he busied himself in exhorting the Normans and Lombards to rally to the support of the Holy See. When autumn came, Desiderius accompanied the Norman army on its march to Rome. However, when he became aware of the plot between the cardinals and the Norman princes to force the papal tiara on him, he would not enter Rome unless they swore to abandon their design. They refused to do that, and the election was postponed. At about Easter the bishops and cardinals assembled at Rome summoned Desiderius and the cardinals who were with him at Monte Cassino to come to Rome to treat concerning the election.

On 23 May a great meeting was held in the deaconry of St. Lucy, and Desiderius was again importuned to accept the papacy but persisted in his refusal, threatening to return to his monastery in case of violence. On the next day, the feast of Pentecost, the same scene was repeated very early in the morning. The Roman consul Cencius now suggested the election of Odo, Cardinal-Bishop of Ostia (afterwards pope Urban II), but this was rejected by some of the cardinals on the grounds that the translation of a bishop was contrary to ecclesiastical law.

Desiderius was finally elected on 24 May 1086 in the deaconry of St. Lucia in Septisolis. He took the name Victor III. Four days later, pope and cardinals had to flee from Rome due to the presence of the Antipope Clement III, and at Terracina, in spite of all protests, Victor laid aside the papal insignia and once more retired to Monte Cassino, where he remained nearly a whole year. In the middle of Lent 1087, the pope-elect assisted at a council of cardinals and bishops held at Capua as "Papal vicar of those parts" (letter of Hugh of Lyons) together with the Norman princes, Cencius the Consul and the Roman nobles. Here, Victor finally yielded and "by the assumption of the cross and purple confirmed the past election". How much his obstinacy had irritated some of the prelates is evidenced in the letter of Hugh of Lyons preserved by Hugh of Flavigny.

After the Normans had driven the soldiers of the Antipope Clement III out of St. Peter's, Victor III was finally consecrated and enthroned on 21 March 1087. He only remained eight days in Rome and then returned to Monte Cassino, though with the help of Matilda and Jordan, he took back the Vatican Hill. Before May was out, he was once more in Rome in answer to a summons for the countess Matilda of Tuscany, whose troops held the Leonine City and Trastevere. By the end of June Clement III once more gained possession of St. Peter's, Victor again withdrew at once to his Monte Cassino abbey.

== Synod and death ==
In August 1087, a synod was held at Benevento which renewed the excommunication of the Antipope Clement III, the condemnation of lay investiture, proclaimed a crusade against the Saracens in northern Africa, and anathematised Hugh of Lyons and Richard, Abbot of Marseilles. After three days, Victor became seriously ill and retired to Monte Cassino to die. He had himself carried into the chapter-house, issued various decrees for the benefit of the abbey, appointed with the consent of the monks the prior, Cardinal Oderisius, to succeed him in the abbacy, just as he himself had been appointed by Stephen IX, and proposed Odo of Ostia to the assembled cardinals and bishops as the next pope. He died on 16 September 1087 and was buried in the tomb he had prepared for himself in the abbey's chapter-house. Odo was duly elected his successor as Pope Urban II.

== Writings ==
Pope Victor's only existing literary work, Dialogues, is on the miracles wrought by Benedict and other saints at Monte Cassino. In his De Viris Illustribus Casinensibus, Peter the Deacon ascribes to him the composition of a "Cantus ad B. Maurum" and letters to King Philip I of France and to Hugh of Cluny, which no longer exist.

Victor is the probable author of a letter to the empress-mother Anna Dalassene concerning the molestation of pilgrims to the Holy Land in the Byzantine Empire. There is also a letter to the bishops of Sardinia, where (since c. 1050 brought under Pisan and Genoan control) he sent monks while still abbot of Monte Cassino.

== Posthumous legacy ==
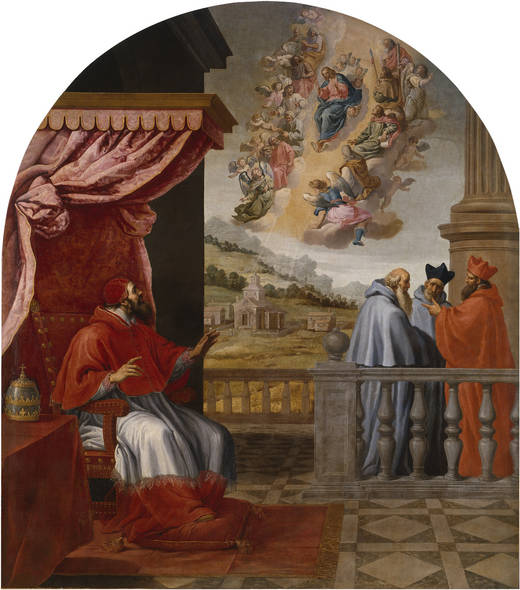
Vincenzo Carducci The Vision of Pope Victor III (1626–1632)

The cult of Blessed Victor III seems to have begun not later than the pontificate of Pope Anastasius IV, about six decades after his death (Acta Sanctorum, Loc. cit.).

In 1515, Victor III's body was relocated to the main abbey church in Monte Cassino with many pilgrims visiting his tomb. In 1727 the abbot of Monte Cassino obtained from Pope Benedict XIII permission to keep his feast. Pope Leo XIII beatified Victor III in 1887, at which point his body was once again moved to the Chapel of St. Victor. During World War II, his body was removed and placed in Rome for safekeeping. The main abbey at Monte Cassino was destroyed in February 1944 by US bombing. Victor's body was moved back to the rebuilt abbey in 1963.

== See also ==
- List of popes

== Sources ==
- Grant, Alasdair C. (2016). "Pisan Perspectives: "The Carmen in victoriam" and Holy War, c.1000–1150". The English Historical Review. 131, No. 552 (OCTOBER) (552): 983–1009. doi:10.1093/ehr/cew343.
- McBrien, Richard P. (2000). Lives of the Popes. HarperCollins.
- Robinson, I. S. (1999). Henry IV of Germany 1056-1106. Cambridge University Press.

Catholic Church titles
Preceded by Gregory VII	Pope; 1086–87	Succeeded by Urban II
