= Atto of Pistoia =

Saint Bishop Atto O.S.B. Vall.
- Bishop of Pistoia
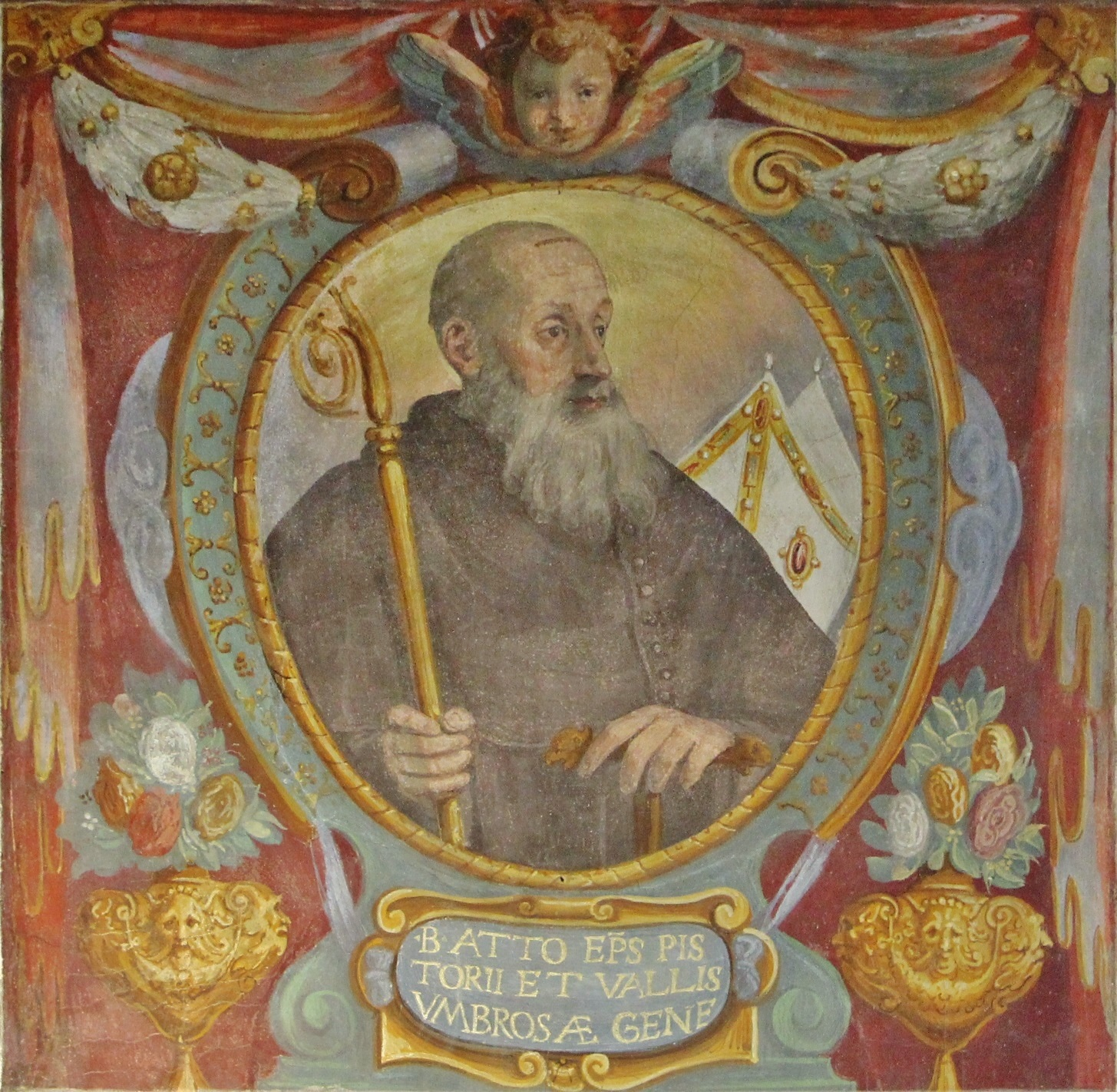
- Native name: Atão de Pistoia
- Church: Roman Catholic Church
- Diocese: Pistoia
- See: Pistoia
- Appointed: 1133
- Term ended: 22 May 1153
- Predecessor: Ildebrando Guidi
- Successor: Tracio

Orders
- Consecration: c. 1133
- Rank: Bishop

Personal details
- Born: Atto c. 1070 Beja, Taifa of Seville
- Died: May 22, 1153 (aged 82–83) Pistoia, Margrave of Tuscany

Sainthood
- Feast day: 22 May; 21 June (Pistoia)
- Venerated in: Roman Catholic Church
- Canonized: 24 January 1605; Saint Peter's Basilica, Papal States by Pope Clement VIII
- Attributes: Episcopal attire; Pastoral staff; Benedictine habit

Atto of Pistoia, or Saint Atto (Portuguese: Santo Atão; c. 1070 – 22 May 1153), was a Catholic bishop and a professed member from the Vallumbrosan Order as well as the Bishop of Pistoia and a noted historiographer.

== Life ==
Atto was born around 1070. Spanish historian Enrique Flórez thought Atto was from Badajoz in Extremadura, Spain close to the Portuguese border. A Portuguese source says he was born in Beja, Portugal.

He went as a pilgrim to Italy, and stopped at Vallombrosa Abbey where he was welcomed by the abbot, Bernardo degli Uberti. By 1100 he was a Vallombrosian monk at Vallombrosa (in Tuscany), and became Abbot in 1105. He became abbott-general around 1120. He wrote lives of John Gualbert and Bernard degli Uberti, bishop of Parma.

In 1135 Atto was made Bishop of Pistoia, also in Tuscany. He continued to follow the rule of his order and served as visitor to the monasteries. Together with his Canons he recited the Hours of the Divine Office, as was already customary in the Cloister. As bishop, he managed the delicate relationship with the municipal authorities of Pistoia, often marked by breakdowns and clashes.

In 1145 he transferred to Pistoia from Santiago de Compostela certain relics of the Apostle James the Great and dedicated an altar to Saint James in the Cathedral of Saint Zeno to house them. This later gave rise to a chapel dedicated to St. James. This had both economic and political ramifications, as pilgrims soon began to come to Pistoia to honor the saint. He also built a hospital in honor of the apostle.

In 1337 the body of the saint was found inside the Church of San Giovanni in Corte and from there moved to the Cathedral of San Zeno. From the middle of the seventeenth century, up to the beginning of the nineteenth century, on the day of June 21, in his honor, the so-called "fires of Sant'Atto" were held in the Piazza del Duomo (or which is the same, in front of the cathedral). People from neighboring districts would flock to the square, which was illuminated with countless torches displayed from ornate window sills.
