= Vallombrosians =

Roman Catholic religious order, based on the Rule of St. Benedict

Vallumbrosan Order Vallombrosians
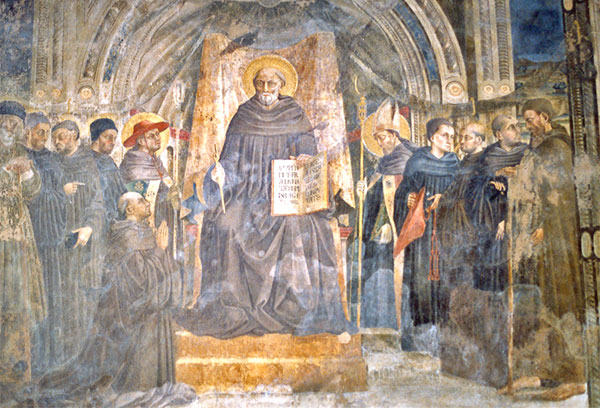
- St. John Gualbert with other Vallumbrosan saints and beati
- Abbreviation: O.S.B. Vall.
- Formation: 1038; 988 years ago
- Founder: Giovanni Gualberto
- Founded at: Italy

The Vallombrosians (alternately spelled Vallombrosans, Vallumbrosians or Vallumbrosans) are a monastic religious order in the Catholic Church. They are named after the location of their motherhouse founded in Vallombrosa (Latin: Vallis umbrosa, lit. 'shady valley'), situated 30 km from Florence on the northwest slope of Monte Secchieta in the Pratomagno chain. They use the postnominal abbreviation OSBVall to distinguish themselves from other Benedictines, who generally use the abbreviation OSB.

== Foundation ==
The founder, a Florentine named John Gualbert, a member of the prominent Visdomini family, was born in the year 985 or 995. His brother was murdered, and it was his duty to avenge the deceased. He met the murderer in a narrow lane on Good Friday and was about to slay him, but when the man threw himself upon the ground with arms outstretched in the form of a cross and begged mercy for the love of Christ, John forgave him.

A popular legend holds that on his way home, John entered the Benedictine church at San Miniato to pray, and the figure on the crucifix bowed its head to him in recognition of his generosity. This story forms the subject of Burne-Jones's picture The Merciful Knight, and has been adapted by Joseph Henry Shorthouse in John Inglesant.

John Gualbert first became a Benedictine monk at San Miniato, but later left that monastery to lead a more perfect life. His attraction was to the cenobitic, and not eremitic life, so after staying for some time with the monks at Camaldoli, he settled at Vallombrosa, where he founded his monastery. The name "Vallombrosa" means "shady glen".

Mabillon estimates its foundation at a little before 1038. Here, it is said, that John and his first companions lived for some years as hermits, but this is rejected by Martène as inconsistent with the reason for leaving Camaldoli. The chronology of the early days of Vallombrosa has been much disputed. The dates given for the founder's conversion vary between 1004 and 1039, and a Vallumbrosan writer places his arrival at Vallombrosa as early as 1008. The church was consecrated by Rotho, Bishop of Paderborn, in 1038, and Itta, the abbess of the neighbouring monastery of Sant' Ellero, donated the site of the new foundation in 1039. The abbess retained the privilege of nominating the superiors, but this right was granted to the monks by Pope Victor II, who confirmed the order in 1056. Two centuries later, in the time of Pope Alexander IV, the nunnery was united with Vallombrosa in spite of the protests of the nuns.

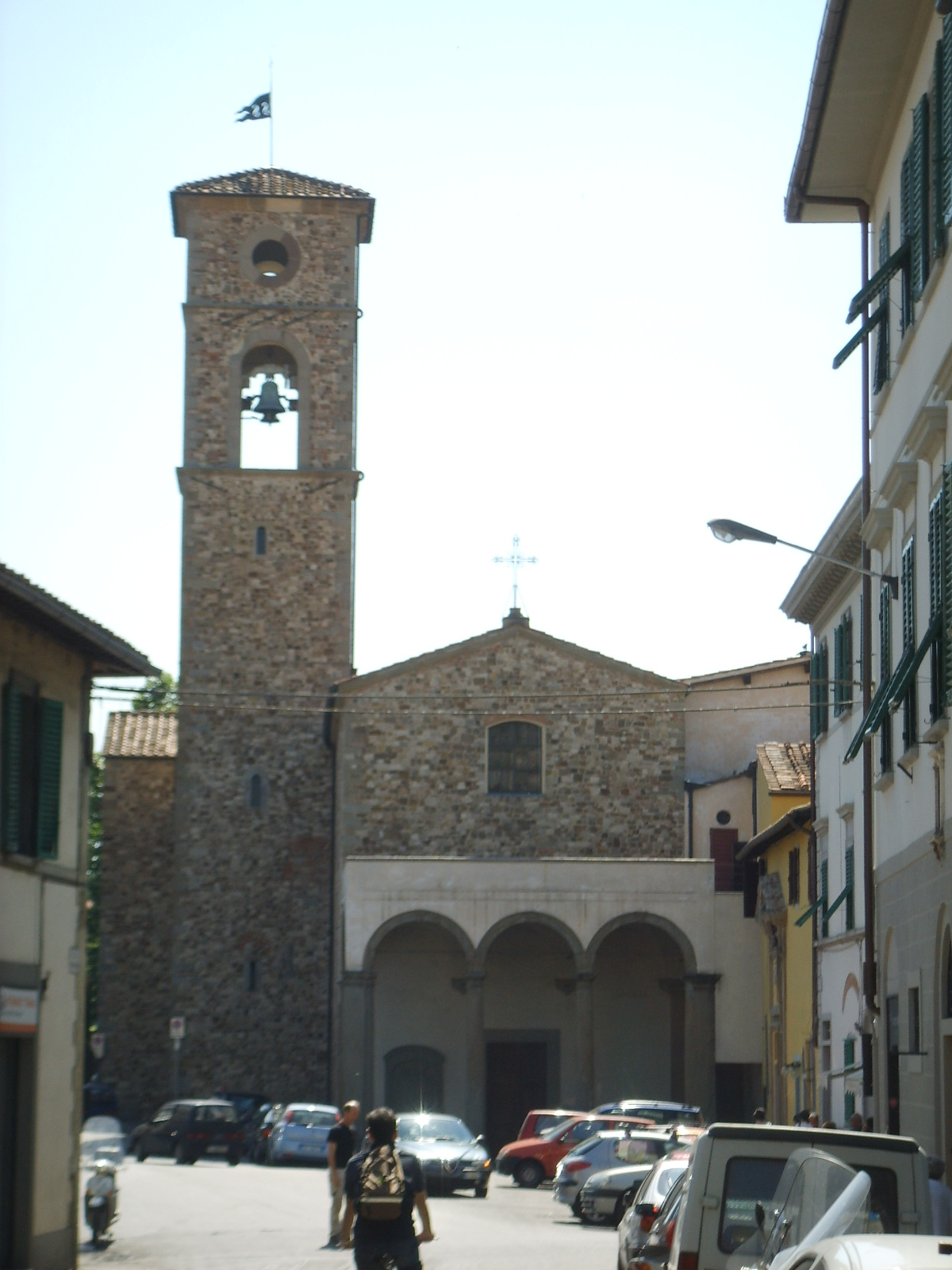
San Salvi (Florence)

The holy lives of the first monks at Vallombrosa attracted considerable attention and brought many requests for new foundations, but there were few postulants, since few could endure the extraordinary austerity of the way of life. Gualbert adopted the Rule of Saint Benedict but added greatly to its austerity and penitential character. His idea was to unite the ascetic advantages of the eremitical life to a life in community while avoiding the dangers of the former. Severe scourging was inflicted for any breach of rule, the silence was perpetual, and poverty was most severely enforced. The rule of enclosure was so strict that the monks could not go out even on an errand of mercy.

The main point of divergence lay in the prohibition of manual work, which is prescribed by St. Benedict. St. John's choir monks were to be pure contemplatives and to this end, he introduced the system of lay-brothers who were to attend to the secular business. He was among the first to systematize this institution, and it is probable that it was largely popularized by the Vallumbrosans. The term conversi (lay brothers) occurs for the first time in Abbot Andrew of Strumi's Life of St. John, written at the beginning of the twelfth century.

Only one other monastery, that of San Salvi at Florence, was founded during this period. Then the founder mitigated his rule somewhat and three more monasteries were founded and three others reformed and united with the order during his lifetime. The early Vallombrosans took a considerable part in the struggle of the popes against simony, of which the most famous incident was the ordeal by fire undertaken successfully by St. Peter Igneus in 1068. Shortly before this, the monastery of San Salvi had been burned and the monks ill-treated by the anti-reform party. These events still further increased the reputation of Vallombrosa.

The habit, originally grey or ash-coloured, is now that of other Benedictines.

=== Development ===
After the founder's death, the order spread rapidly. A bull of Urban II in 1090, which took Vallombrosa under the protection of the Holy See, enumerated 15 monasteries aside from the motherhouse. Twelve more are mentioned in a bull of Paschal II in 1115, and 24 others in those of Anastasius IV (1153) and Adrian IV (1156). By the time of Innocent III, they numbered over 60. All were situated in Italy, except two monasteries in Sardinia (now part of Italy).

In 1090, Peter Igneus founded the Abbey of Santa Maria in Montepiano in Tuscany. In 1087, Andrew of Vallombrosa (d. 1112) founded the monastery of Cornilly in the Diocese of Orléans, and in 1093 the Abbey of Chezal-Benoît, which later became the head of a considerable Benedictine congregation. There are no grounds for the legend given by some writers of the order of a great Vallombrosan congregation in France with an abbey near Paris, founded by King St. Louis.

The Vallombrosan congregation was reformed in the middle of the fifteenth century by Cassinese Benedictines, and again by John Leonardi at the beginning of the seventeenth century.

Certain abbeys, headed by that of San Salvi of Florence, had formed a separate congregation. In 1485, these were reunited to the motherhouse by Innocent VIII. At the beginning of the sixteenth century, an attempt was made by Abbot-General Milanesi to found a house of studies on university lines at Vallombrosa; but in 1527 the monastery was burned by the troops of Emperor Charles V. It was rebuilt by Abbot Nicolini in 1637, and in 1634 an observatory was established.

From 1662–1680 the order was united to the Sylvestrines.

In 1808 Napoleon I's troops plundered Vallombrosa, and the monastery lay deserted till 1815. It was finally suppressed by the Italian Government in 1866. A few monks still remain to look after the church and meteorological station, but the abbey buildings have become a school of forestry that was founded in 1870 on the German model, the only one of its kind in Italy. Vallombrosa is also a health resort.

The decline of the order may be ascribed to the hard fate of the motherhouse, to the system of commendatory abbots, and to the constant wars which ravaged Italy. Practically all the surviving monasteries were suppressed during the course of the eighteenth and nineteenth centuries.

== Rule and functioning ==
The abbots were originally elected for life but are now elected at the general chapter, held every four years. The Abbot of Vallombrosa, the superior of the whole order, had formerly a seat in the Florentine Senate and bore the additional title of Count of Monte Verde and Gualdo.

The shield of the order shows the founder's arm in a tawny-coloured cowl grasping a golden crutch-shaped crozier on a blue ground.

The services rendered by the order have been mostly in the field of asceticism. Among the Vallumbrosan saints may be mentioned: Veridiana, anchoress (1208–42); Giovanni Dalle Celle (feast, 10 March); the lay brother Melior (1 August). By the middle of the seventeenth century, the order had supplied twelve cardinals and more than 30 bishops. F.E. Hugford (1696–1771, brother of the painter Ignazio Hugford), is well known as one of the chief promoters of the art of scagliola (imitation of marble in plaster). Abbot-General Tamburini's works on canon law are well known. Galileo was for a time a novice at Vallombrosa and received part of his education there.

== Present day ==
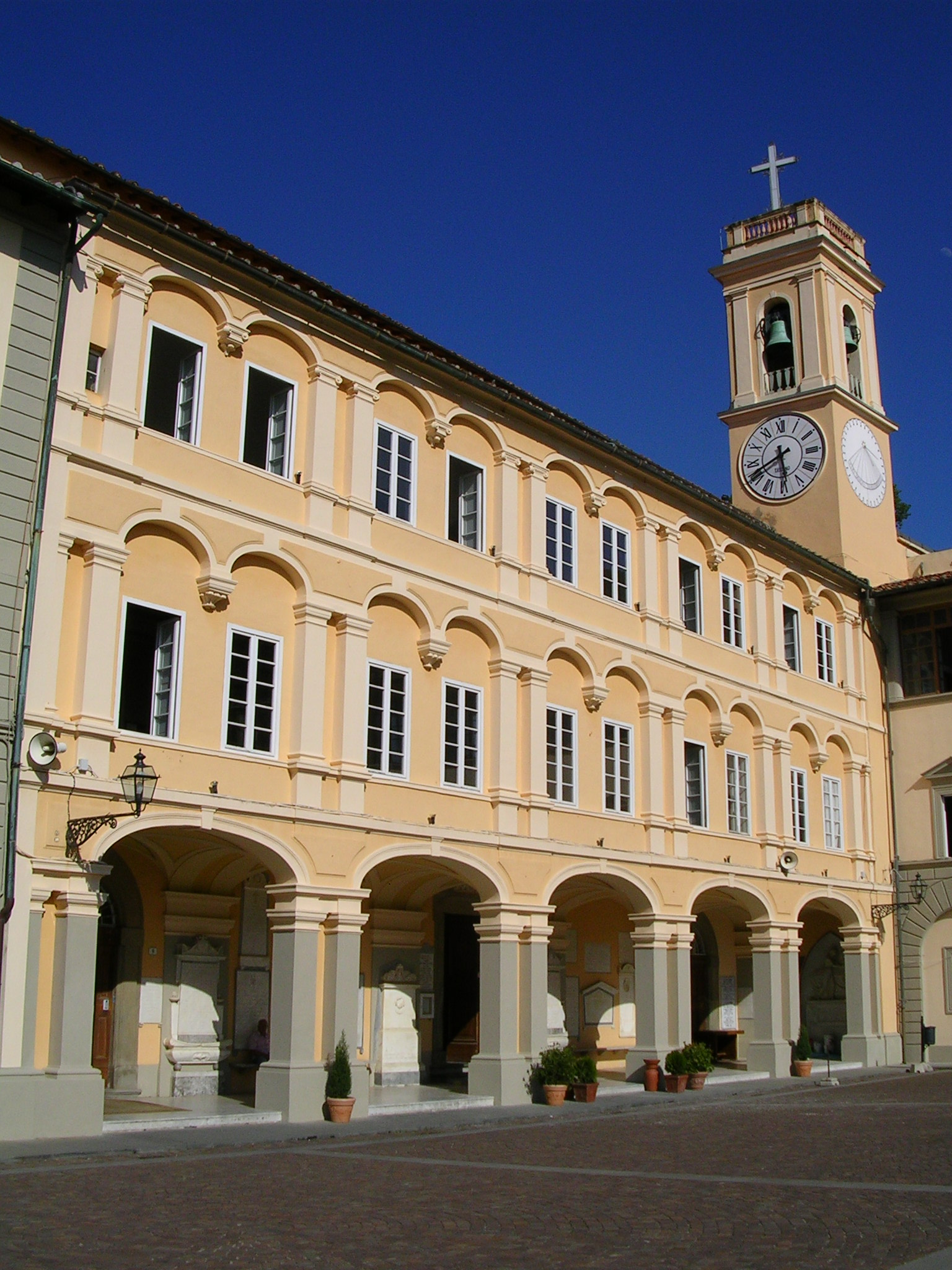
Santuario di Montenero

The Vallombrosians are part of the Benedictine Confederation. In 2015 the order had nine houses with 73 monks (48 priests). The motherhouse is Vallombrosa Abbey.

The abbot-general is currently Giuseppe Casetta. Pierdamiano Spotorno is the Archivist and Librarian of Congregation.

The Vallombrosian monks maintain the Sanctuary of Montenero in Livorno, dedicated to Our Lady of Grace of Montenero, patron of Tuscany. They have also had the management of the Basilica of Santa Prassede in Rome since 1198.

The Vallombrosians in Bangalore support themselves by producing Italian cheeses for sale to upscale restaurants.

== Nuns ==
Saint Humility is usually regarded as the foundress of the Vallumbrosan nuns. She was born at Faenza about 1226, was married, but with the consent of her husband, who became a monk, entered a monastery of canonesses and afterwards became an anchoress in a cell attached to the Vallumbrosan church of Faenza, where she lived for twelve years.

Lay sisters who, under the charge of an aged lay brother, lived in a separate house and performed various household duties were attached to the monastery of Vallombrosa.

At the request of the abbot-general Humility then founded a monastery outside Faenza and became its abbess. In 1282, she founded a second convent at Florence, where she died in 1310. She left a number of mystical writings.

When they ceased to be attached to the monasteries of monks, these sisters probably continued to lead a conventual life. Blessed Bertha d'Alberti (d. 1163) entered the Vallumbrosan order at Florence and reformed the convent of Cavriglia in 1153.

In 1524, the nuns obtained the Abbey of San Salvi, Florence. There are Vallumbrosan nunneries at Faenza and San Gimignano, besides two at Florence. The relics of St. Umiltà and her disciple Bl. Margherita are venerated at the convent of Spirito Santo at Varlungo. The habit is similar to that of other Benedictine Nuns.

== Saints and Blesseds of the Order ==
Saints

- Giovanni Gualberto (c. 985 – 12 July 1073), founder of the Order, canonized on 24 October 1193.
- Bernardo degli Uberti (c. 1060 – 4 December 1133), Bishop of Parma and Cardinal, canonized on 3 December 1139.
- Atto da Pistoia (c. 1070 – 22 May 1153), Bishop of Pistoia, canonized on 24 January 1605.

Blesseds

- Pietro "Igneo" Aldobrandini (died 11 November 1089), Cardinal-Bishop of Albano, beatified on 4 March 1673.
- Benedetto Ricasoli da Coltibuono (c. 1040 - 20 January 1107), monk, beatified on 14 May 1907.
- Verdiana degli Attavanti di Castelfiorentino (c. 1182 – 1 February 1242), anchorite, beatified on 20 September 1533.
- Umilita Negusanti di Caccianemici (c. 1226 – 22 May 1310), founder of the Vallumbrosan Nuns, beatified on 27 January 1720.

Declared Blessed by popular acclaim

- Erizzo da Vallombrosa (c. 1000 – 9 February 1084), fourth Abbot General of the Vallumbrosan Order and the first disciple of Saint Giovanni Gualberto
- Rustico Angeleri da Vallombrosa (died 6 or 12 November 1092), Abbot General of the Vallombrosan Congregation (in 1076) and one of the first companions of Saint Giovanni Gualberto
- Orlando da Vallombrosa (died sometime in the 13th century?), hermit
- Tesauro Beccaria (died 12 September 1258), Abbot General of the Order martyred for having secretly negotiated with Manfred of Sicily in favor to return the Ghibellines to Florence
- Giovanni dalle Celle da Catignano (c. 1310 - c. 1396), abbot
