= Reggello =

- Comune
- Comune di Reggello
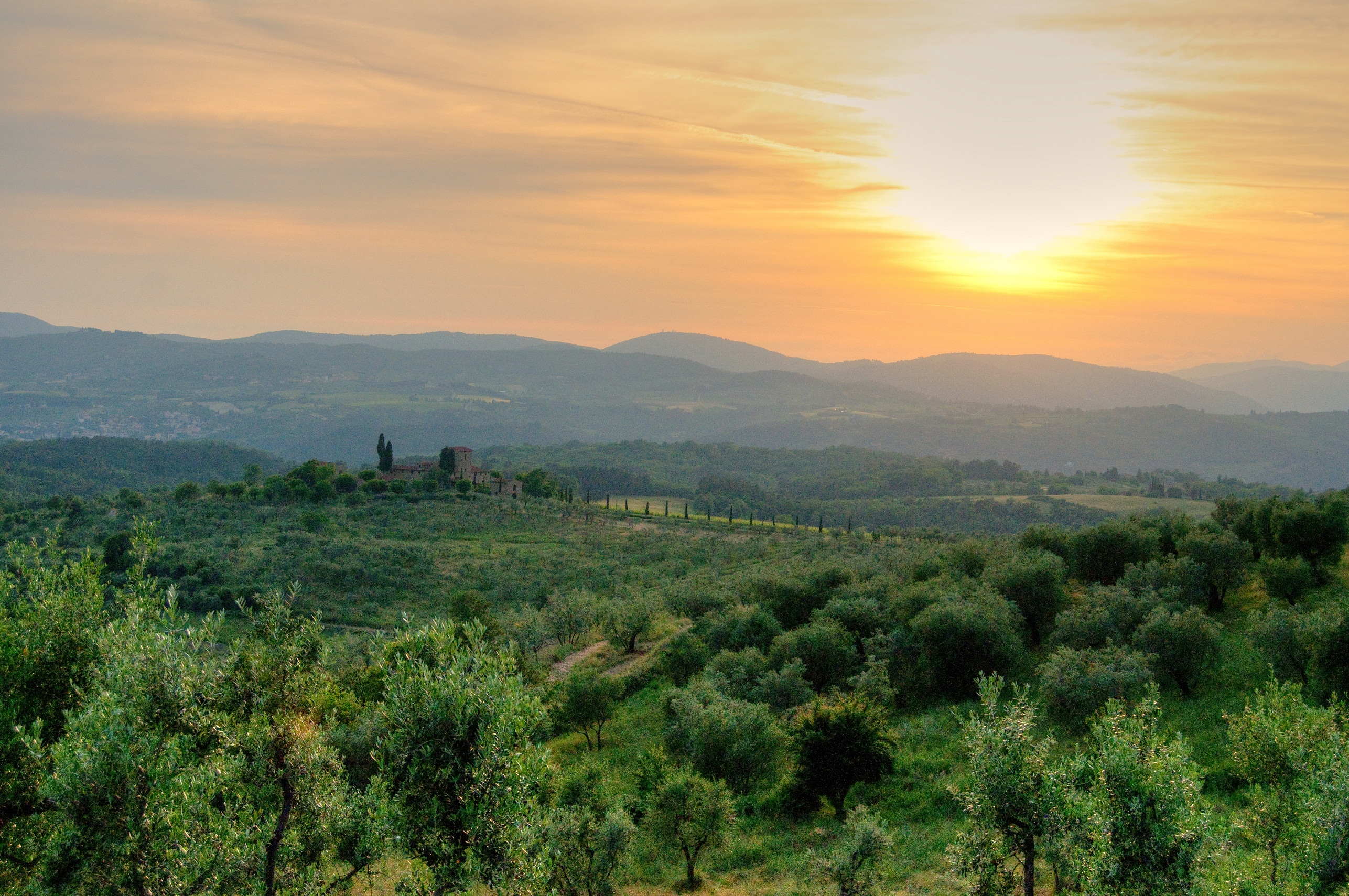
- Countryside in Reggello

- Coat of arms

- Reggello within the Metropolitan City of Florence

- Location within Italy Location within Tuscany
- Coordinates: 43°41′N 11°32′E
- Country: Italy
- Region: Tuscany
- Metropolitan city: Florence (FI)
- Frazioni: Cancelli, Canova, Cascia, Caselli, Ciliegi, Donnini, Leccio, Matassino, Montanino, Pietrapiana, Pontifogno, Prulli, Saltino, San Clemente, San Donato in Fronzano, Sant'Ellero, Tosi, Vaggio, Vallombrosa

Government
  - Mayor: Cristiano Benucci (Partito Democratico)

Area
  - Total: 121.68 km^{2} (46.98 sq mi)
- Elevation: 390 m (1,280 ft)

Population (31 December 2016)
  - Total: 16,340
  - Density: 134.3/km^{2} (347.8/sq mi)
- Demonym: Reggellesi
- Time zone: UTC+1 (CET)
  - Summer (DST): UTC+2 (CEST)
- Postal code: 50066
- Dialing code: 055
- Patron saint: St. James
- Website: Official website http://www.visitreggello-tuscany.com/en/

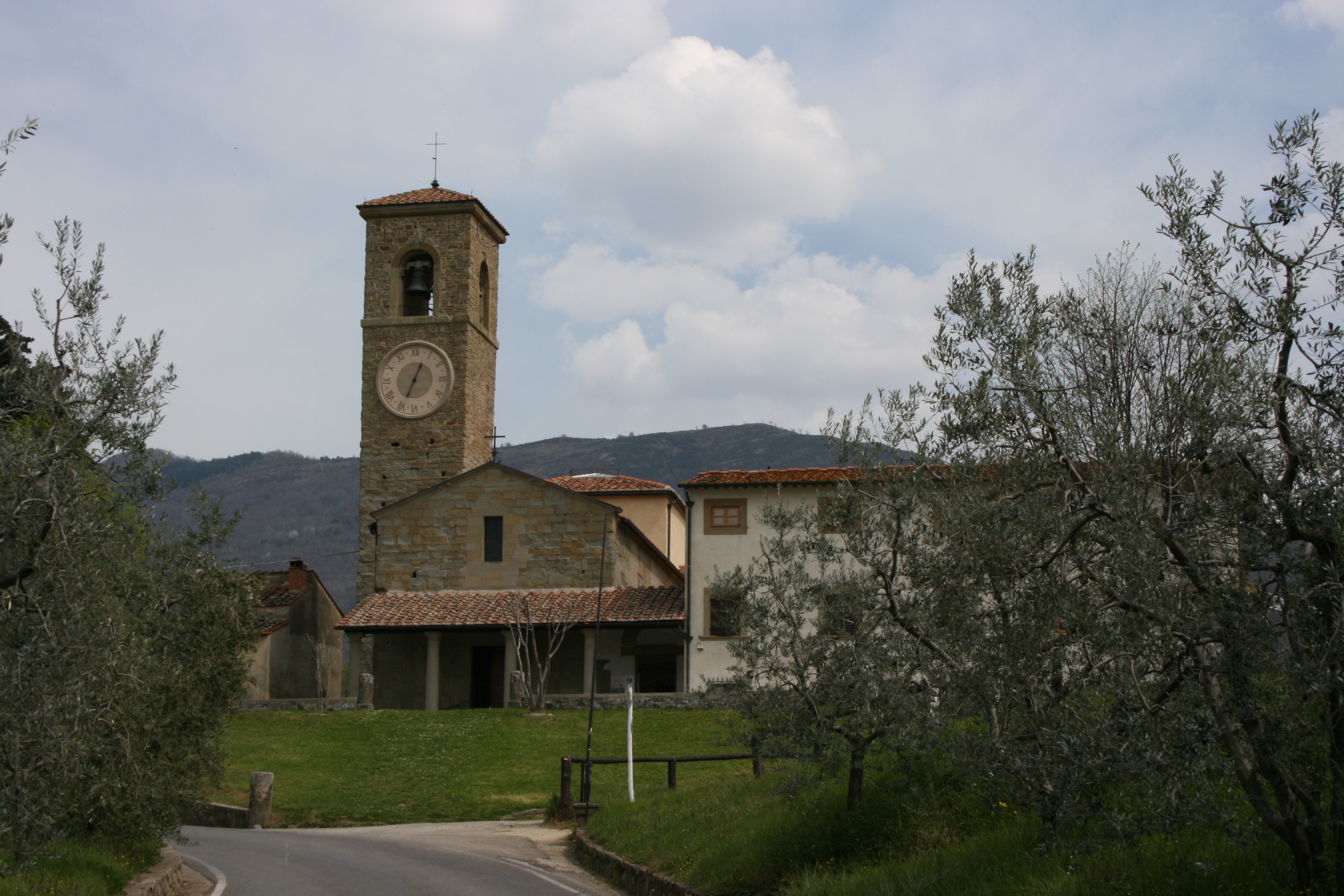
Church of St. Agata at Arfoli.

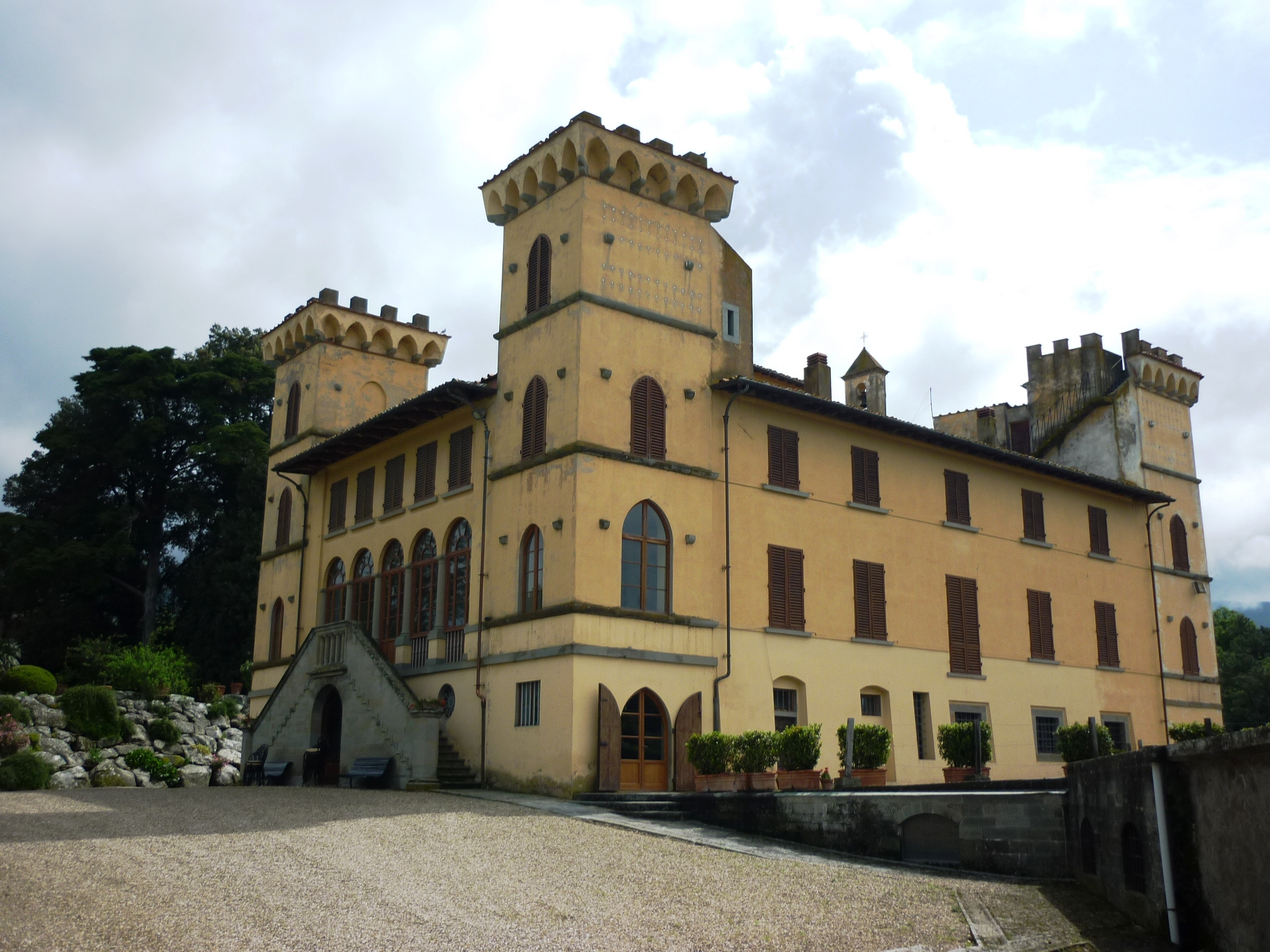
Bonsi Castle in Pietrapiana.

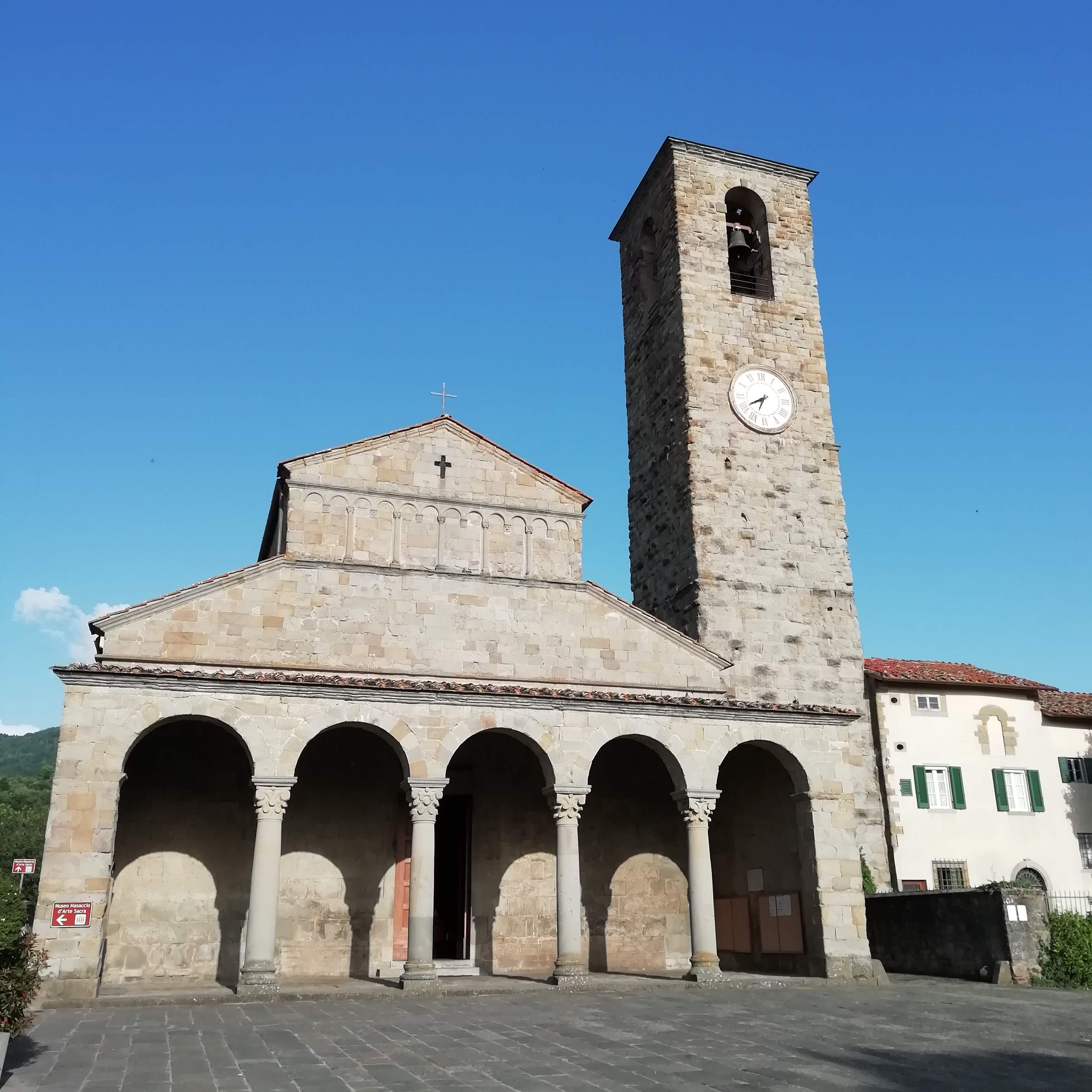
The Parish Church of San Pietro a Cascia

Reggello is a comune (municipality) in the Metropolitan City of Florence in the Italian region of Tuscany, located about 35 kilometres (22 miles) southeast of Florence, between the north-western side of Pratomagno and the Upper Valdarno.

The municipality borders with Castel San Niccolò, Castelfranco Piandiscò, Figline e Incisa Valdarno, Montemignaio, Pelago, and Rignano sull'Arno.

== History ==
The territory has been inhabited since ancient times and many place names indicate the presence of Etruscan, Roman and Longobards. Initially called "Castelvecchio di Cascia", Reggello born as a marketplace near the Resco torrent where three streets meet: two trails from Casentino Valley and the Cassia Vetus (now called Setteponti road).

The Reggello community was officially founded in 1773. Its current territorial structure dates back to 1840.

The 1966 flood of the Arno triggered a landslide that destroyed a neighborhood in Reggello, killing seven people.

== Sights ==
- The Parish Church of San Pietro in Cascia, built in a strategic position along the Roman Cassia Vetus road (Setteponti road). The church is one of the most important examples of Romanesque architecture in the area.
- Masaccio Museum of Sacred Art in Cascia, only a couple of steps away from the church, is home to Masaccio’s first masterpiece: the Triptych of San Giovenale, dated 1422.
- The Abbey of Vallombrosa. Peaceful and secluded, the abbey is home to Benedictine monks. It also houses a Museum of Sacred Art. All around the abbey there are chapels and tabernacles (The Circuit of Chapels).
- The Castle of Sammezzano in Leccio is the most important example of orientalist architecture in Italy (the castle and the park are private property and at the moment visitors are not allowed access).
- Many other churches dot the countryside around Reggello, such as the one dedicated to Sant’Agata ad Arfoli and that of Pitiana, as well as castles and historic villas (Torre del Castellano, Bonsi, Mandri, Graffi, Pitiana).
- The Mall Luxury Outlet, in Leccio
- The Excelsior Theater

== Natural areas ==
- The Biogenetic Nature Reserve in Vallombrosa, on the western slope of the Pratomagno mountain chain. The Reserve is home to the ancient Abbey, the Experimental Arboretums, the tallest tree in Italy, and many paths, some of which along the itineraries dedicated to St Francis and Dante Alighieri.
- The Forest of Sant'Antonio, Protected Nature Area of Local Interest. At the foot of the Forest there is the Visitors Centre for the Protected Areas of Ponte a Enna (open in Summer). This is the starting point of many paths for walks and hikes.
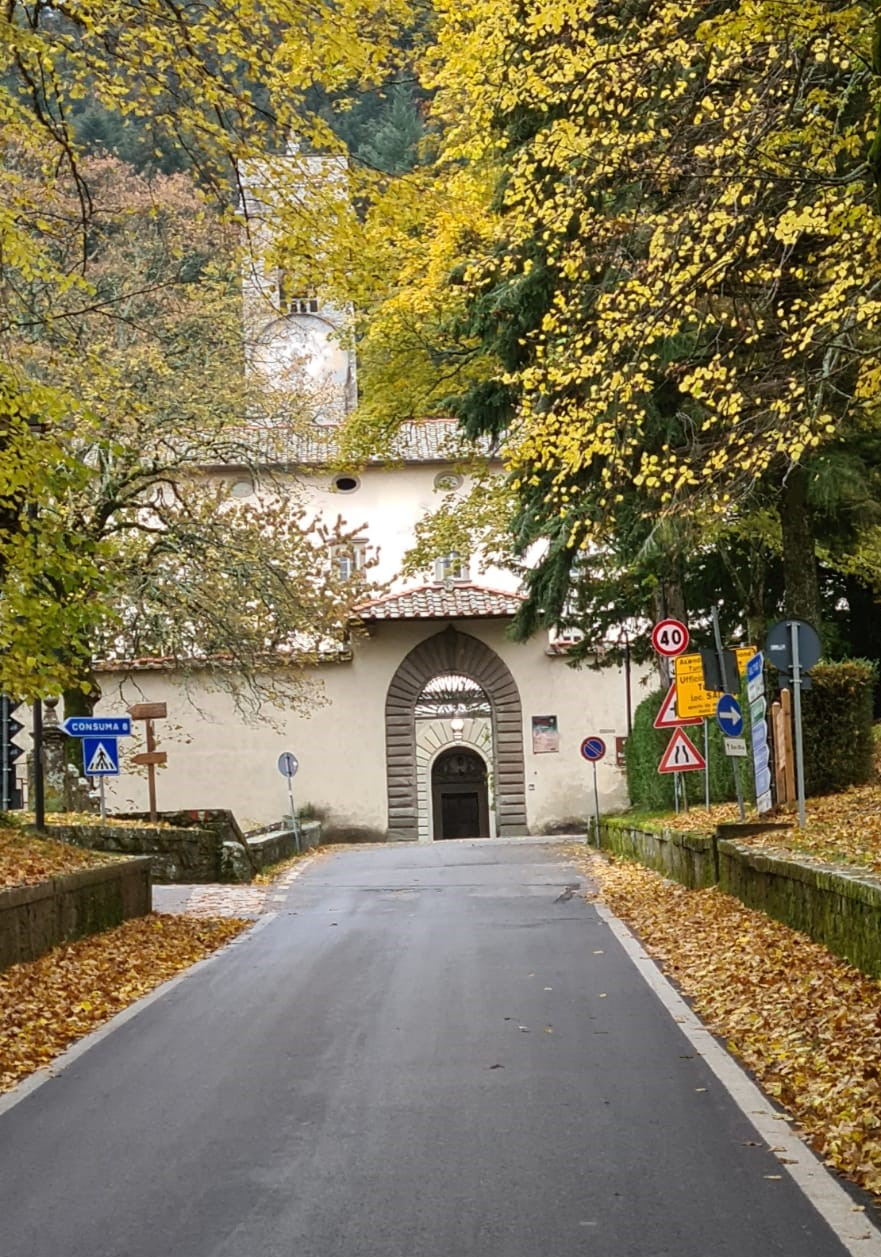
- Vallombrosa - The Abbey and the Reserve
  The Balze, Protected Nature Area of Local Interest located in the Upper Valdarno. Balze are a geological structures formed by stratified sand, clay, and gravel. These impressive canyons originate from the lake that covered the Valdarno during the Pleistocene.

== Local products ==
- Extra Virgin Olive Oil - The EVO Reggello oil has particular organoleptic characteristics and low acidity thanks to the altitude, the temperate climate and a soil almost unique in Tuscany, with a very low content of limestone and a high content of quartz. Every November the green gold is celebrated at the Rassegna dell'Olio Extravergine di Oliva (Olive Oil Festival). Reggello is a member of the National Association of Olive Oil Cities.
- Cecino Rosa di Reggello - a type of chickpea highly digestible and with a delicate taste.
- Fagiolo Zolfino - A typical bean from the Valdarno and Pratomagno.

== Sport ==
The local football team is called S.S. Resco Reggello, now playing in Promozione division.

== Notable people ==
- Francesco Pagliazzi (1910–1988), painter
