= Bernard degli Uberti =

Italian Roman Catholic prelate

Saint Bernardo degli Uberti O.S.B. Vall.
- Bishop of Parma
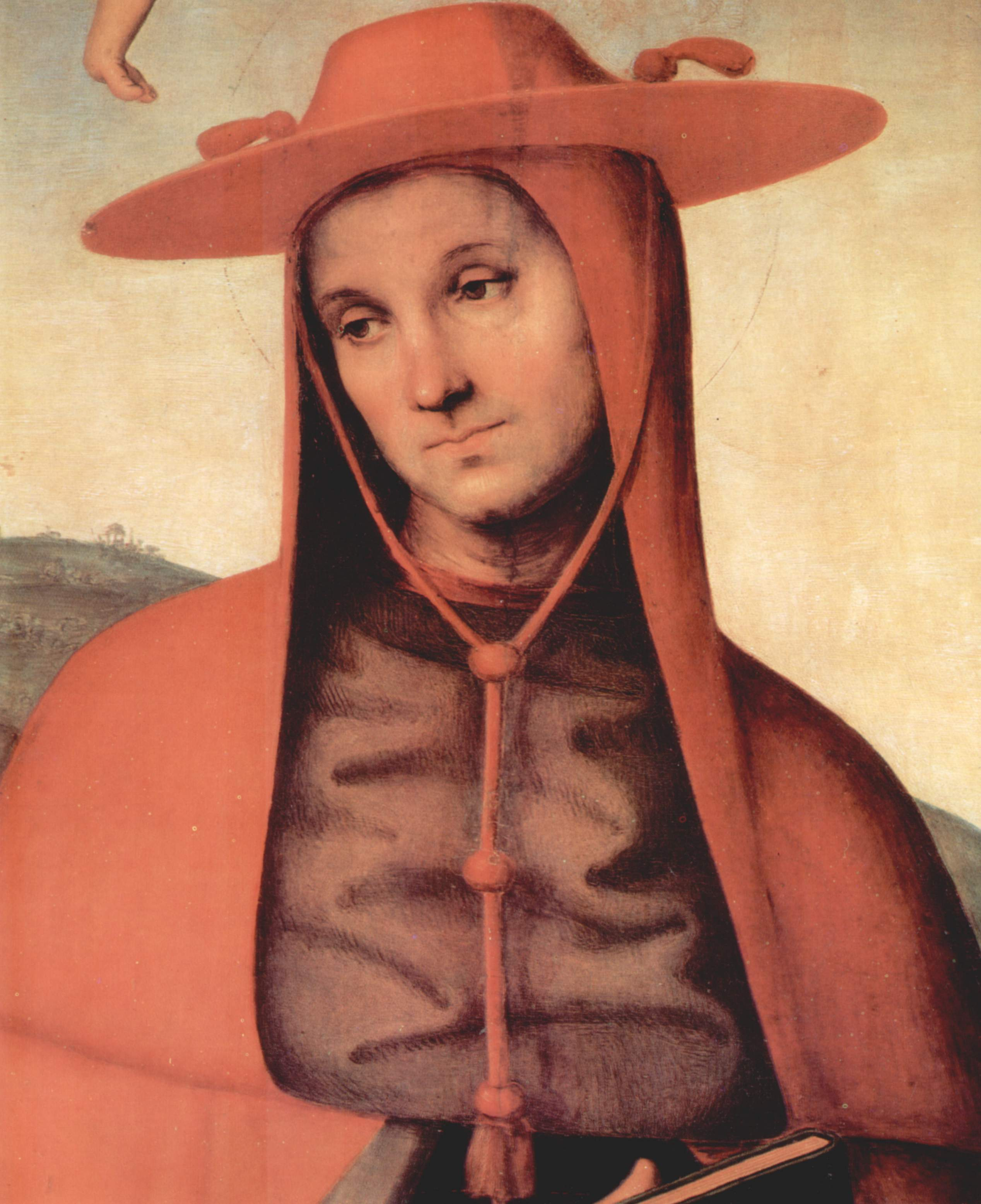
- Bernardo degli Uberti - Pietro Perugino.
- Church: Roman Catholic Church
- Diocese: Parma
- See: Parma
- Appointed: October 1106
- Term ended: 4 December 1133
- Predecessor: Guido
- Successor: Alberto
- Other post: Cardinal-Priest of San Crisogono

Orders
- Consecration: November 1106 by Pope Paschal II
- Created cardinal: c. 1097 by Pope Urban II
- Rank: Cardinal-Priest

Personal details
- Born: Bernardo degli Uberti c. 1060 Florence, Tuscan Margrave
- Died: 4 December 1133 (aged 73) Parma, Republic of Florence
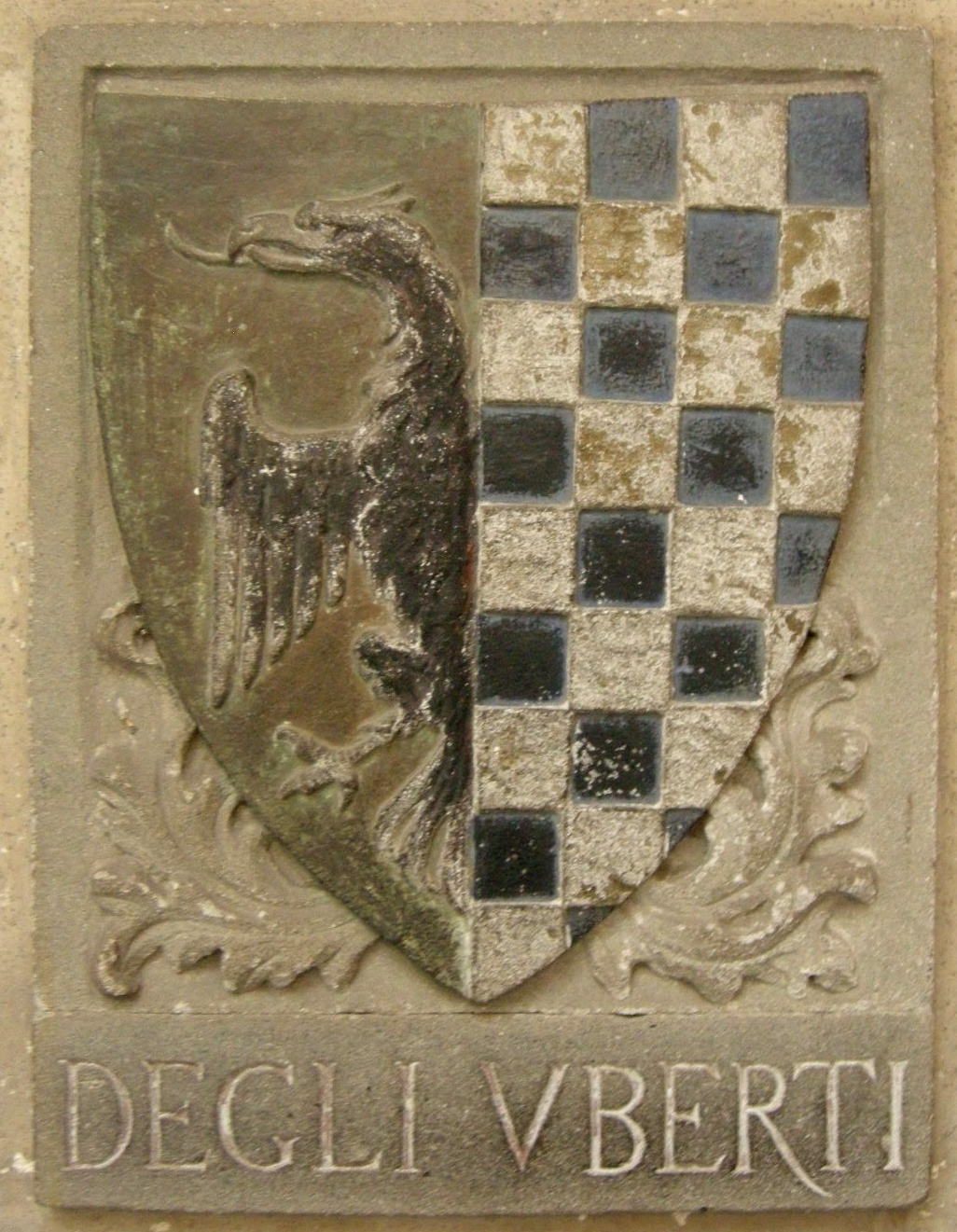
- Coat of arms

Sainthood
- Feast day: 4 December
- Venerated in: Roman Catholic Church
- Canonized: 3 December 1139; Old Saint Peter's Basilica, Rome, Papal States by Pope Innocent II
- Attributes: Benedictine habit; Cardinal's attire
- Patronage: Diocese of Parma; Vallumbrosans

Bernardo degli Uberti (c. 1060 – 4 December 1133) was an Italian Roman Catholic prelate who was a professed member and served as an abbot of the Vallumbrosan Order. Uberti served as the Bishop of Parma from 1106 until his death and was appointed as a cardinal. He came from the noble Uberti house from Florence. Uberti served as a papal legate for successive popes in several Italian regions in their disputes with secular rulers and was a close confidant and advisor to the Countess Matilda. He is often considered the third founding father of the order alongside Benedict of Nursia (the order was a branch of the Benedictines) and Giovanni Gualberto.

Uberti's fame for holiness became so great that miracles were reported on a frequent basis at his tomb. This led to Pope Innocent II naming Uberti a saint only six years after his death, on 3 December 1139.

== Life ==
Bernardo degli Uberti was born circa 1060 in Florence to the nobles Bruno degli Uberti and Ligarda. His paternal grandfather was Corbizo. He was the nephew of Pietro Igneo.

Bernardo's father died sometime in 1085, and it was on 1 July 1085 that he made a donation to the San Salvi convent for his father's repose. But he also became a monk in the Vallumbrosans and he later made another donation for the repose of his father and grandfather on 26 April 1089. He became the abbot for San Salvi (1092-1099) and was later elected as the Superior-General for the congregation in 1098, after the death of the abbot Almarius of Vallambrosa. On 7 March 1100, he presided over a meeting of all the order's abbots to discuss important resolutions on both organization and discipline.

In 1097, Pope Urban II named Uberti Cardinal-Priest of San Crisogono. He worked at the Lateran until 1101, when he was appointed papal legate to Lombardy and began to serve as an advisor to Countess Matilda. On 7 April 1101, he was sent as a legate to Grosseto and on 4 May 1101 was with Matilda in Governolo where she restituted some lands to the pope upon his advice. He was also a legate to Milan in 1102 to oversee the election of Grosulano as its archbishop while he was later a legate to Pavia on 18 August 1102. He was also with the countess in Panzano on 18 October 1102 and travelled with her to Castro Panciano in March 1103. On 15 August 1104, he was in Parma in an attempt to keep the people faithful to the pope in his struggle against Emperor Heinrich V and the Antipope Maginulf. The people, however, drove him into exile. Some sources state that he was in fact dragged from the altar of the Cathedral in a violent scene. He was exiled again in 1127, after opposing the proclamation of Conrad II.

In September 1104, he served as an advisor to the countess in both Cosogno and Modena while on 20 March 1105, he was in the Lateran Palace to sign a papal bull for the pope. Uberti tried to return to Parma in August 1105 to recruit troopers for the pope in his struggle against the German king but this venture proved unsuccessful.

He was later appointed as the Bishop of Parma in October 1106 at the Council of Guastalla where the pope made the announcement. He received his episcopal consecration from Paschal II himself in Parma in November. In February 1111, he and Roman Curia were removed from Rome and imprisoned at the behest of the emperor. The pope too had been taken prisoner but it was the countess who managed to obtain their release. But Paschal II decided to crown the emperor and Uberti attended this event in Rome on 13 April 1113. It was almost two decades later that he stood alongside Pope Innocent II when a schism loomed and the antipope Anacletus II attempted to gain control.

He died in his sleep on 4 December 1133 and was interred in the Parma cathedral. He was the subject of paintings that Bernardino Gatti and Pietro Perugino made.

== Canonization ==
Uberti's canonization was solemnized on 3 December 1139, after Pope Innocent II proclaimed him to be a saint. Pope Alexander VII and Pope Clement IX made extensions on his liturgical feast for the Parma diocese.

== Other sources ==
- Affò, Ireneo (1788). Vita di San Bernardo degli Uberti abate gen. di Vallombrosa cardinale di s. chiesa e vescovo di Parma (in Italian). Parma: Presso Filippo Carmignani.
- Chronicon Parmense. Monumenta historica ad provincias Parmensem et et Placentinam pertinenti, Volume 5a (in Latin). Parma: ex officina P. Fiaccadori. 1855. pp. 491–515.
- Donizo, "Vita Mathildis Comitissae", in: Georgius Henricus Pertz, ed. (1856). Monumenta Germaniae historica inde ab anno Christi quingentesimo usque ad annum millesimum et quingentesimum (in Latin). Vol. Scriptorum Tomus XII. Hannover: Impensis Bibliopolii Aulici Hahniani. pp. 348–409, esp. p. 398.
