= Lamberto Cristiano Gori =

Italian painter (1730–1801)

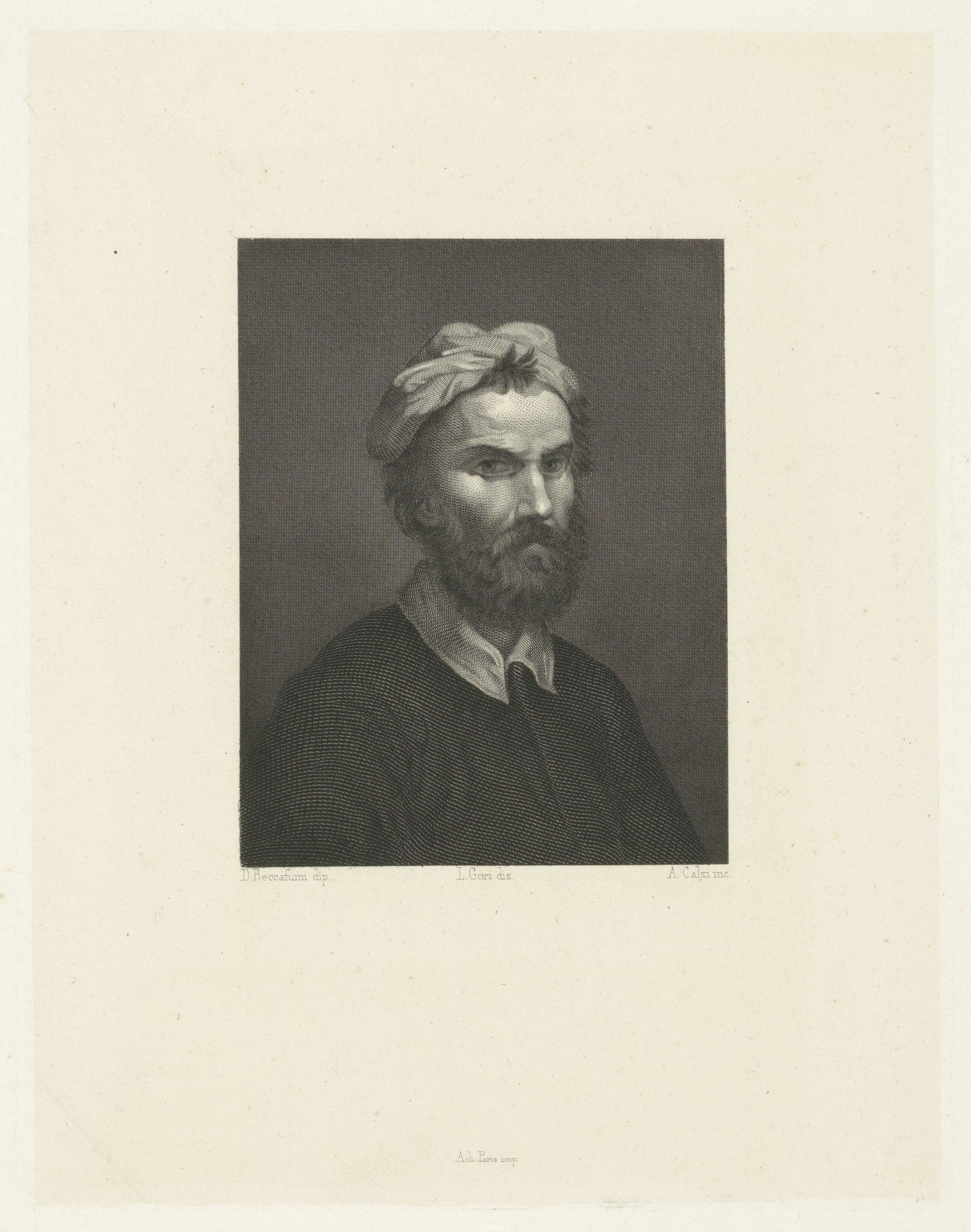

Lamberto Cristiano Gori (1730–1801) was an Italian painter and artist active mostly in Tuscany. He worked in an early Neoclassic style.

== Life and work ==
Lamberto Gori was born in Livorno. He became the pupil of Ignazio Hugford, the painter and monk of the Benedictine Abbey of Vallombrosa. Gori is known for painting, mostly reproductions of earlier masters, and designs produced in scagliola.
