= Arboreti di Vallombrosa =

Arboreta in Tuscany, Italy

Coordinates: 43°43′55″N 11°33′18″E

The Arboreti di Vallombrosa (about 12 hectares) are seven arboreta located within the Forest Demaniale Vallombrosa near the historic Vallombrosa Abbey founded in 1036 by St. John Gualbert of Visdomini, heavenly patron of the Italian Forestry Corps. They are located in Vallombrosa, Reggello, Province of Florence, Tuscany, Italy, operated by the Carabinieri Department for Biodiversity of Vallombrosa. During the summer months there are free guided tours every day, in all other periods upon prior request.

The arboreta dates back to 1869 at another location, or to 1884 in the current location, when 230 plants were transferred in a move of the Regio Istituto Superiore Forestale's headquarters within the Vallombrosa forest. New sections were added in 1885–1886, and in 1891 a botanical garden was created; it was abandoned in 1914 and nothing remains today but a tub. In 1894, another section was added to the Masso del Diavolo to provide a suitable environment for Mediterranean species. Severe bombing during World War II badly damaged the arboreta, but they have since recovered.

Today the arboreta currently contain more than 5,000 specimens belonging to more than 1200 species of trees and shrubs, representing 137 genera, and claim to be Italy's most important collection of plants cultivated for scientific and experimental purposes. They encompass seven distinct arboreta organized into 50 sections. The arboreta are as follows:

- Arboreto "di Bérenger" (1869, area 1.32 hectares)
- Arboreto "Siemoni" (1880, area 0.34 hectares)
- Arboreto "Tozzi" (1886, area 3.00 hectares)
- Arboreto "Gellini" (1894, 3 hectares), on the Masso del Diablo
- Arboreto "Perona" (1914, area 0.97 hectares)
- Arboreto "Pavari" (1923–1958, area 2.10 hectares)
- Arboreto "Allegri" (1976, 1 hectare)

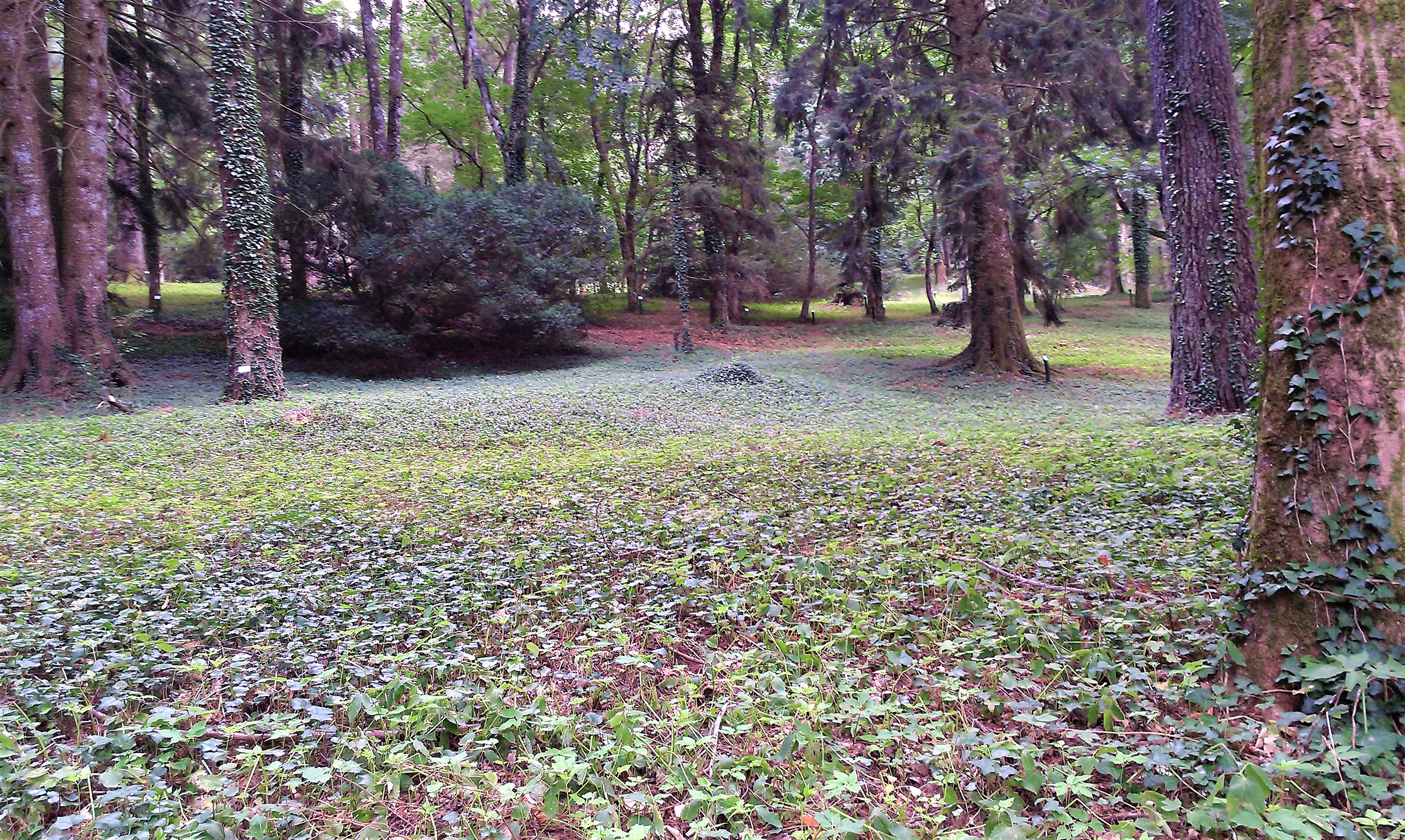
The Experimental Arboretums of Vallombrosa

== See also ==
- List of botanical gardens in Italy
- Vallombrosa
