= Uberti =

Uberti is a surname. Notable people with the surname include:

- Bernard degli Uberti (1060–1133), Italian Roman Catholic prelate
- Claudio Uberti (born 1957), Argentine government official
- Daniel Uberti (born 1963), Uruguayan footballer
- Farinata degli Uberti (1212–1264), Italian aristocrat
- Francesco Uberti (born 1962), Italian sprint canoer
- John Uberti, American military officer
- Pietro Uberti (1671–1762), Italian painter

== See also ==
- A. Uberti, Srl., firearm manufacturer
