= The Merciful Knight =

Painting by Edward Burne-Jones

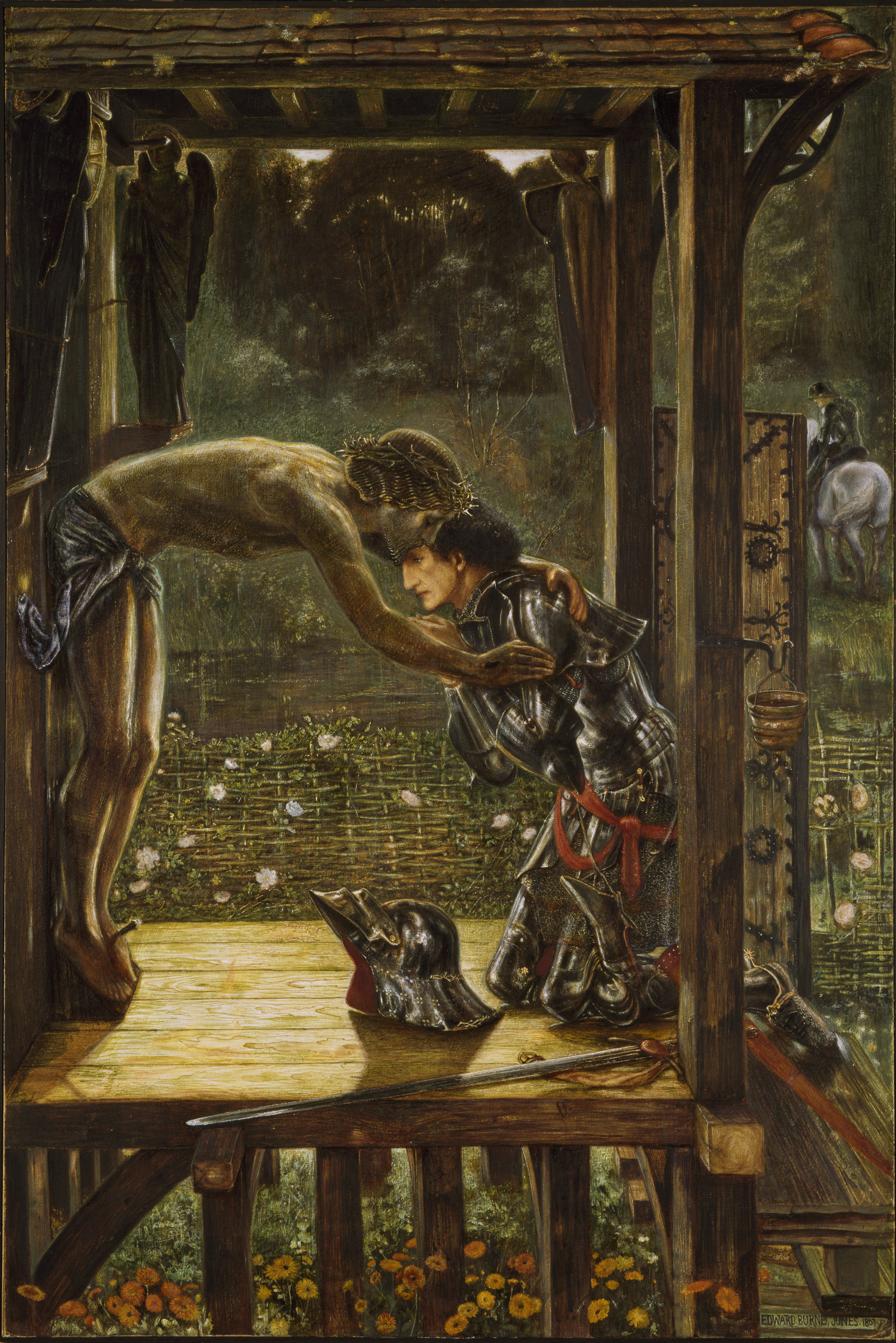
- Artist: Edward Burne-Jones
- Year: 1863
- Type: watercolour with bodycolour on paper
- Dimensions: 101.4 cm × 58.6 cm (39.9 in × 23.1 in)
- Location: Birmingham Museum & Art Gallery, Birmingham

The Merciful Knight is a watercolour by the pre-Raphaelite artist Edward Burne-Jones which was completed in 1863 and is currently housed at the Birmingham Museum & Art Gallery.

== History ==
This picture is based on an 11th-century legend retold by Sir Kenelm Digby in Broadstone of Honour, its hero is a Florentine knight named John Gualbert (an anglicisation of Giovanni Gualberto). The explanatory inscription provided by Burne-Jones tells the viewer of a knight who forgave his enemy when he might have destroyed him and how the image of Christ kissed him in token that his acts had pleased God.

John Gualbert was an Italian Roman Catholic saint, the founder of the Vallumbrosan Order. He was a member of the Visdomini family of Florentine nobility. One Good Friday he was entering Florence accompanied by armed followers, when in a narrow lane he came upon a man who had killed his brother. He was about to kill the man in revenge, when the other fell upon his knees with arms outstretched in the form of a cross and begged for mercy in the name of Christ, who had been crucified on that day. John forgave him. He entered the Benedictine Church at San Miniato to pray, and the figure on the crucifix bowed its head to him in recognition of his generosity. John Gualbert was later canonised.

This arguably being Burne-Jones's most important early work, it demonstrates a new and more personal style, evident in its design, technique and expression. It remained Burne-Jones's own favourite among his early works: this interest in knights and chivalry was aroused when painting the Arthurian Oxford Union murals in 1863 and was to remain with him throughout his life. In 1894 he tried to borrow The Merciful Knight to make a large oil version, and he was actually working on The Last Sleep of Arthur in Avalon when he died in 1898.

In Burne-Jones preliminary sketches for The Merciful Knight, the kiss given by Christ is far more passionate, with strong homoerotic overtones. In this finished version, painted in gouache, the kiss became protective and deeply caring, without any sexual implications. The beard of Christ provides a shield over the knight's forehead and inexpressibly sad face; the wounds in Christ's hands draw attention to the vulnerability of the knight's exposed hands – whose armoured gauntlets hang from his waist. Incidentally, the marigolds in the foreground came from the 'town garden' in Russell Square, close to Burne-Jones' house opposite the British Museum.

== See also ==
- List of paintings by Edward Burne-Jones
- John Gualbert
- Arthurian legend

== Notes ==
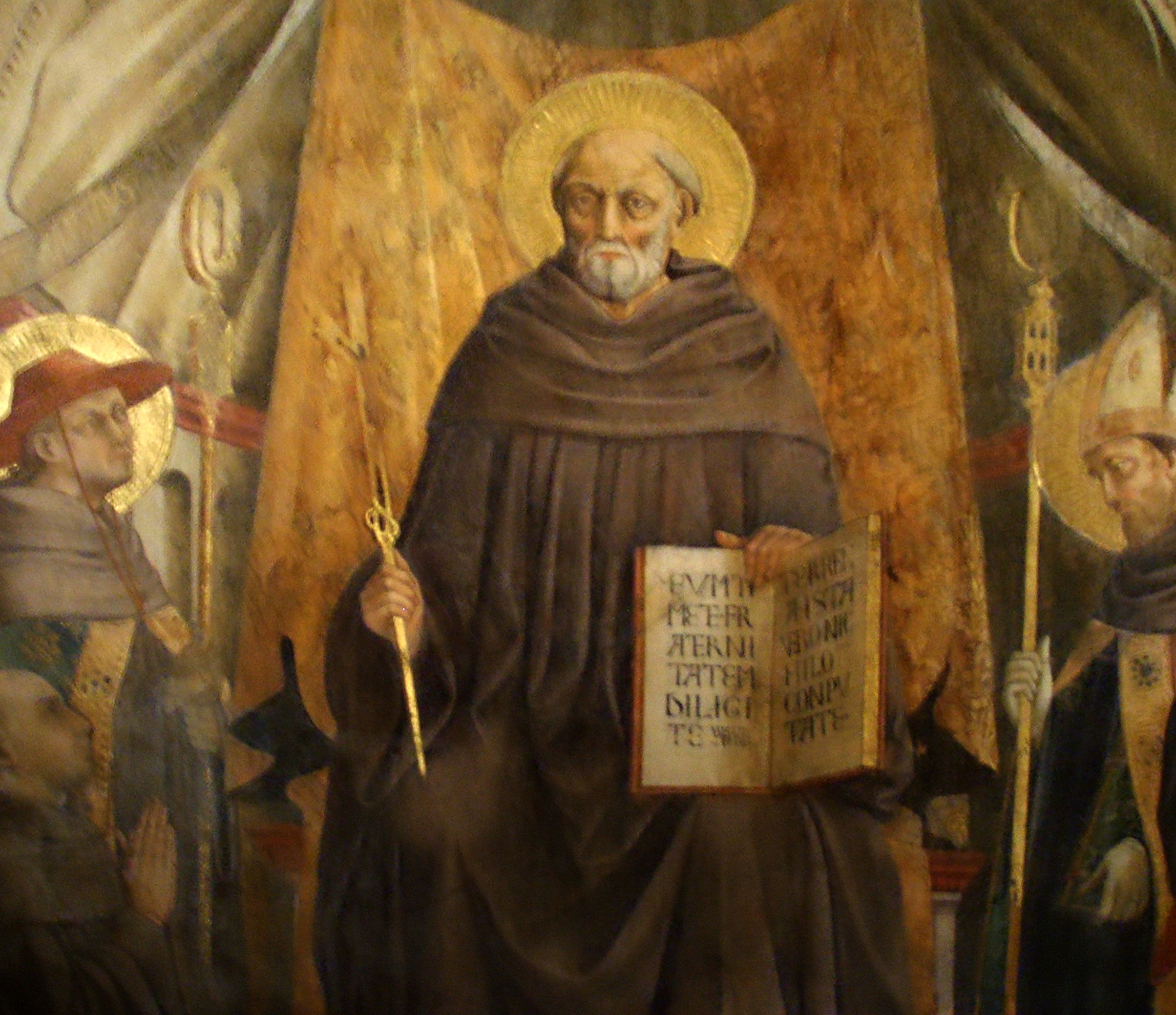
St John Gualbert. -Fresco by Neri di Bicci, Santa Trinita in Florence
