= Francesco Pagliazzi =

Italian painter (1910–1988)

Francesco Pagliazzi (1910–1988) was an Italian painter born in Reggello, a small comune in the Province of Florence. His subjects ranged from landscape to still-life and portraiture. His works were exhibited in Florence and Milan.
