= Sante Pacini =

Italian painter

Sante Pacini (1735 – c. 1790) was an Italian painter and engraver active mostly in Tuscany in an early Neoclassic style.

== Life and work ==
Sante was born in Florence, and was a pupil of Ignazio Hugford.

He was the son of Michele Pacini, an engraver working for Anton Domenico Gabbiani. Sante made engravings for Cento Pensieri Diversi by Gabbiani.
