= Bertha de Bardi =

Blessed Bertha de Bardi

Abbess
- Born: unknown Florence
- Died: 24 March 1163; Valdarno
- Venerated in: Roman Catholic Church
- Feast: March 24

Blessed Bertha de Bardi (died 24 March 1163) was born in Florence. She was the daughter of Lothario di Ugo, Count of Vernio; while she is commonly known as de Bardi, some sources speculate that she is more likely to have belonged to the Alberti family.

Bertha joined the Vallumbrosan Order, a branch of the Benedictines, at Santa Felicita, Florence in 1143. The general of the order, Gualdo Galli, soon sent her to govern and reform a convent Cavriglia in Valdarno. Bertha remained there until her death, becoming famous for miracles.

== Sources ==
- Fedele Soldani, Vita di S. Berta, Florence, 1731.
