= Saint Humility =

Italian saint

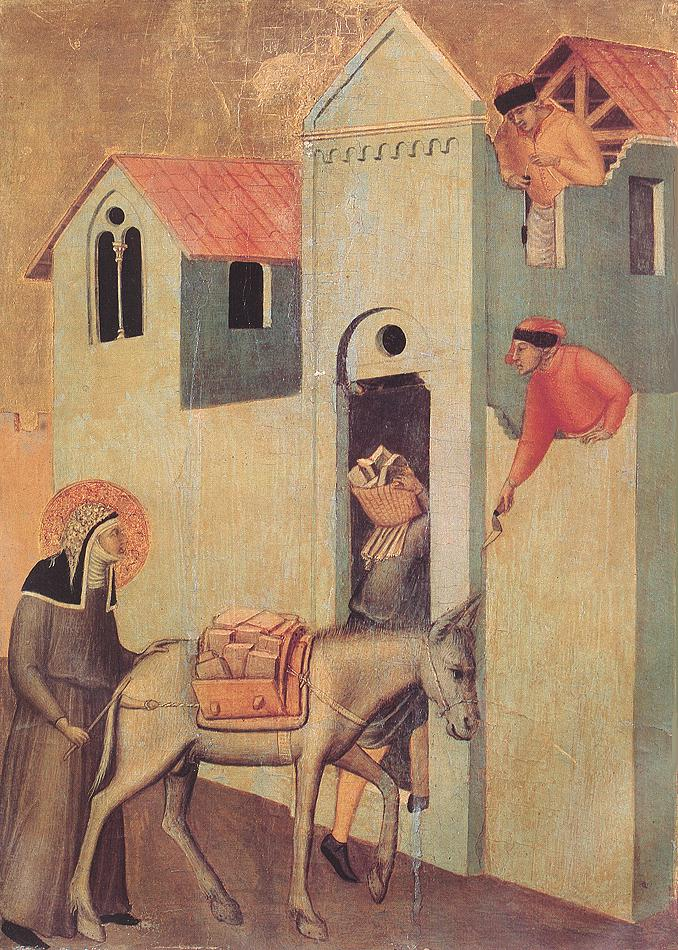
- Saint Humility transports bricks to build the monastery.
- Born: Rosanna Negusanti c. 1226; Faenza, Italy
- Died: 22 May 1310; Florence, Italy
- Venerated in: Roman Catholic Church
- Canonized: 27 January 1720, Saint Peter's Basilica, Rome, Papal States by Pope Clement XI
- Major shrine: Monastery of the Holy Spirit in Bagno a Ripoli on the outskirts of Florence
- Feast: 22 May
- Attributes: depicted as a nun
- Patronage: Faenza

Saint Humility (Latin: Humilitas; Italian: Umiltà) (c. 1226 – 22 May 1310), known as Saint Roxanne (Italian: Santa Rosanna) was the founder of the Vallumbrosan Nuns.

== Biography ==
Born Rosanna Negusanti to a noble family from Faenza, she was married at the age of fifteen to a nobleman named Ugoletto (Ugonotto) dei Caccianemici (d. 1256). She bore two children, both of whom died in infancy. In 1250, together they decided to enter the double monastery Saint Perpetua, near Faenza. Rosanna became a canoness, taking the name Humilitas.

In 1254 she became an anchoress in a cell attached to the Vallumbrosan church of Saint Apollinaris in Faenza, where she lived as a hermit or recluse for twelve years. Her example attracted some young women from Faenza who asked to build other cells near hers and to live under her guidance.

In 1266, however, at the request of the abbot-general she founded a Vallumbrosan monastery (which became called Santa Maria Novella alla Malta) outside Faenza and became its abbess.

In 1282, she founded a second convent at Florence, dedicated to Saint John the Evangelist, where she died in 1310. The convent was decorated by the artist Buonamico Buffalmacco, and consecrated in 1297 by the bishop Francesco Monaldeschi.

She left a number of writings. She is most known for composing and preaching nine Latin sermons, and for writing Lauds to the Virgin Mary in verse.

On 27 January 1720 by Pope Clement XI confirmed the ancient cult. In 1942 she was declared co-patron of Faenza; altars were dedicated to her in the two monasteries she founded of the Vallombrosan Congregation. Her feast day is celebrated on 22 May.

In 1972, the relics of Humility were translated to the Monastery of the Holy Spirit in Bagno a Ripoli, on the outskirts of Florence.

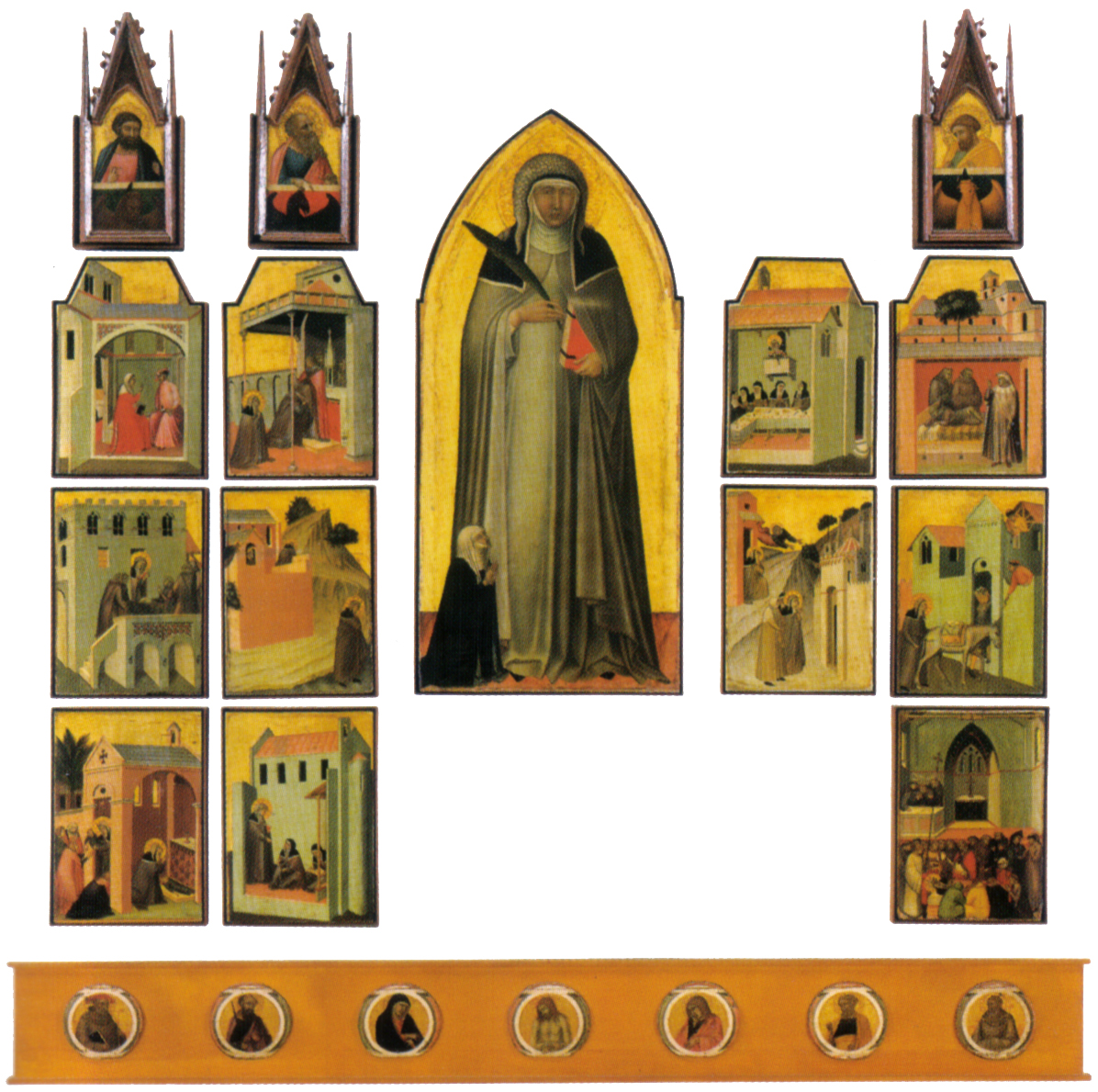
Altarpiece of beata umiltà, Pietro lorenzetti (Uffizi)

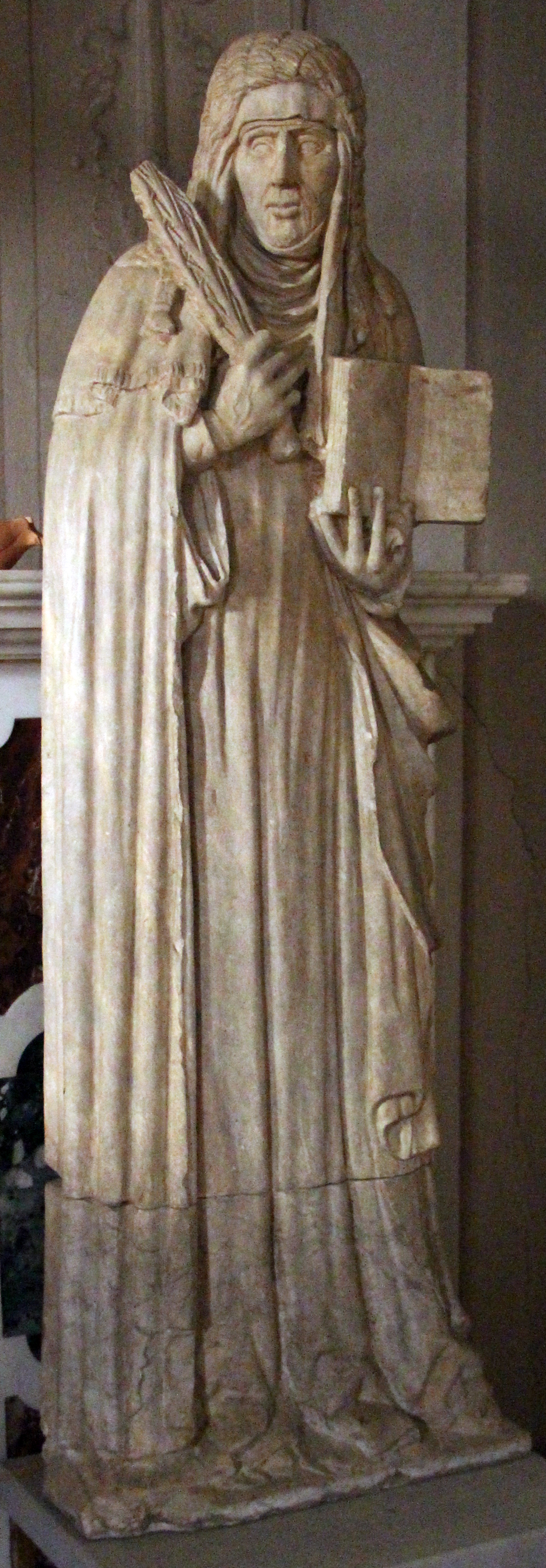
Beata Umiltà, San Michele a San Salvi:Andrea orcagna (attr.), ca. 1350]
