= Verdiana =

Italian Christian anchorite (1182–1242)

Saint Veridiana
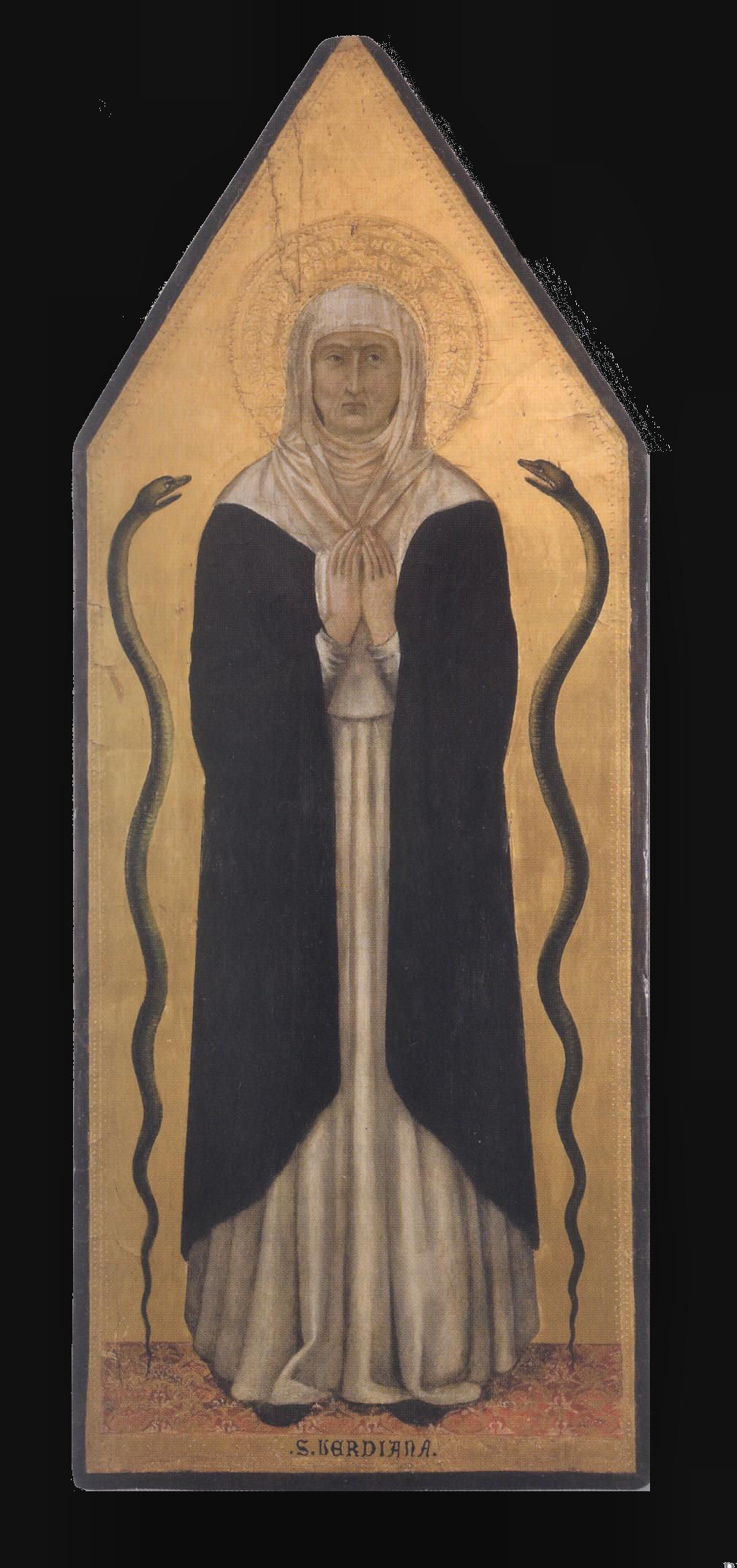
- S.Verdiana, Museo di Santa Verdiana, Castelfiorentino
- Born: 1182; Castelfiorentino, Italy
- Died: 1 February 1242; Castelfiorentino, Italy
- Venerated in: Roman Catholic Church
- Canonized: 1533 by Pope Clement VII
- Feast: 1 February
- Attributes: snakes; depicted as a nun preaching to snakes

Veridiana (Virginia Margaret del Mazziere) (1182 – 1 February 1242) is an Italian saint. Having made pilgrimages to Santiago de Compostela and Rome, she then became an anchoress.

== Life ==
Born at Castelfiorentino, Tuscany, of a noble family, the impoverished but still prestigious Attavanti, Verdiana was noted from an early age for her generosity and sense of charity. It is said that one day her uncle had accumulated and resold a certain amount of foodstuffs, the price of which had skyrocketed due to a severe famine. But when the buyer showed up to collect the purchased material, the warehouse turned out to be empty, because in the meantime Verdiana had donated everything to the poor. The only response to her uncle's irritated reaction was the invitation to wait twenty-four hours: effectively the next day God rewarded the girl's charity and confidence by finding the harvest so generously donated intact.

She made a pilgrimage to Santiago de Compostela. Upon returning to Castelfiorentino and feeling a desire for solitude and penance, the villagers built her a small cell contiguous to the oratory of San Antonio. From a small window she attended Mass and spoke with the visitors and received donations of food. She remained secluded there for 34 years under the obedience of a Vallumbrosan abbey.

Like many recluses of her era, it is not certain whether Verdiana belonged to any particular monastic order. The Dominican order appropriated her after her death through the redaction of her vita, but she probably belonged to none of the mendicant orders during her lifetime. One late account suggests that in 1221 she was visited by Francis of Assisi, who admitted her into his Third Order. It is more likely that she was associated with the local monastery in Castelfiorentino, which belonged to the Vallombrosan order. Even this affiliation, however, most likely occurred after her death, as various monastic orders vied for “possession” of yet another popular saint.

Another local tradition holds that upon her death, the bells of Castelfiorentino began to ring unaided by any human hand, unexpectedly and simultaneously.

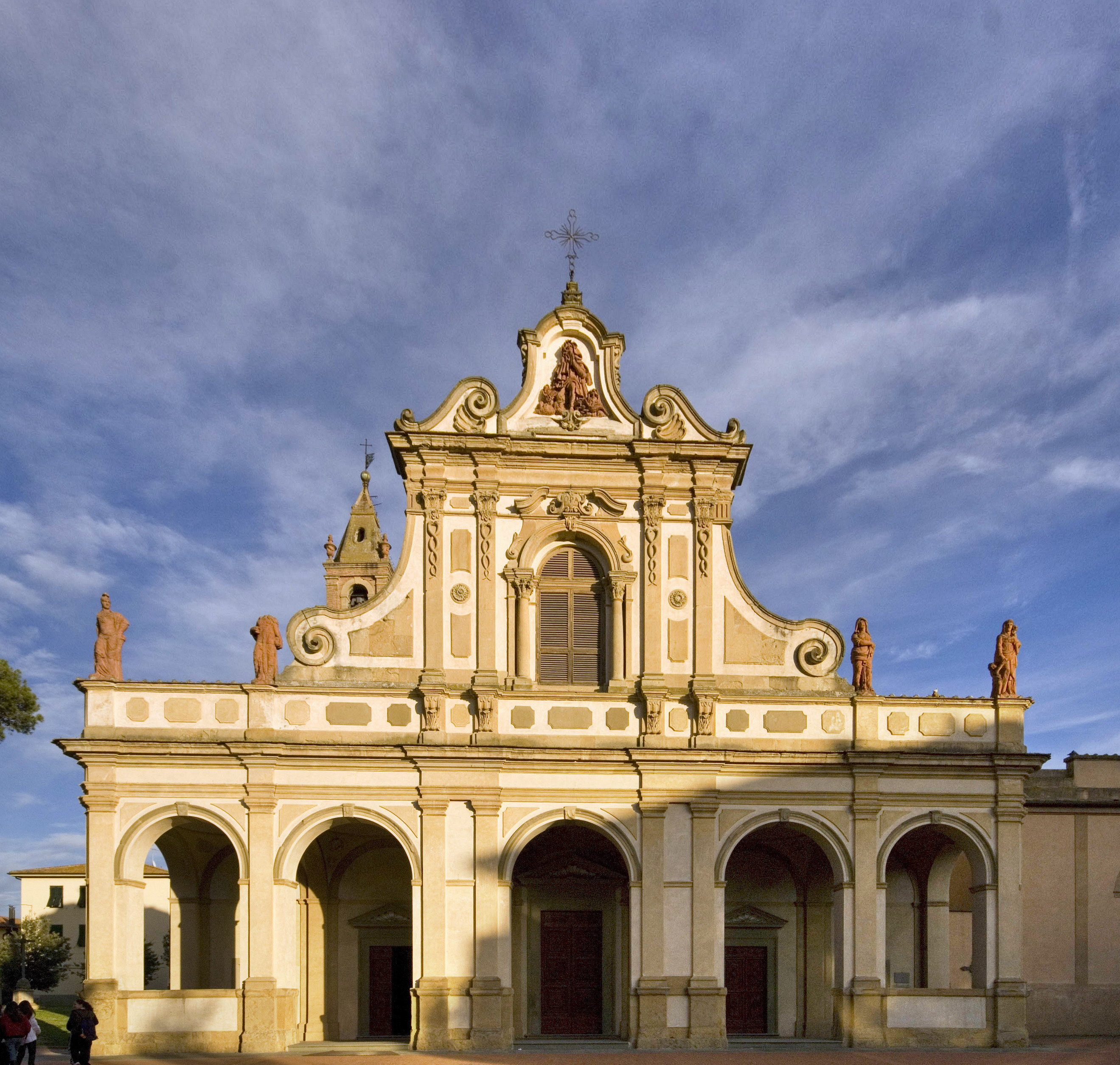
Santuario di Santa Verdiana, Castelfiorentino

== Veneration ==
She was canonized by Pope Clement VII in 1533. Her feast day is 1 February. Verdiana is the patron saint of Castelfiorentino.

The structure of the Santuario di Santa Verdiana in Castelfiorentino incorporates the pre-existing Oratory of Sant'Antonio and the cell that welcomed the saint in the last thirty-four years of her life.

The Museum of Sacred Art of Saint Verdiana is housed in an ancient rustic structure, called the Casalone - adjacent to the Sanctuary of Saint Verdiana.

== Vitae ==
Knowledge of Verdiana and her life comes from two hagiographies, one from the fourteenth century and the other from the fifteenth. The first was redacted around 1340 and attributed to Biagio, a monk and perhaps abbot of the Vallombrosan convent of Santa Trinita in Florence during the first half of the fourteenth century. Very little else is known about him other than the fact that around 1340 he collected and assembled from preexisting materials a compendium of the lives of saints venerated in Florence and Tuscany, now contained in the Biblioteca Medicea Laurenziana.

Verdiana’s second hagiographer, Lorenzo Giacomini, was a native of Castelfiorentino born circa 1369. He entered into the Dominican order in Florence in 1383, and after acting as a lettore for many years in various convents, including those of the Roman and Lombard provinces, he was made bishop of Acaia in 1413 by Pope John XXII. It is thought to be shortly after this time, around 1420, that he wrote a new vita in deference to his native city and to his particular devotion to Verdiana. His account borrowed faithfully from Biagio, though Giacomini sought to enrich it with miracles and information on the cult and translations of Verdiana known from contemporary traditions and his own experience. It is this version, erroneously attributed to Bishop Attone of Pistoia, that appears in the Acta Sanctorum. Because of the two vitae, it is possible for scholars to compare Verdiana’s hagiographically “typical” life in Biagio’s earlier vita and the greater emphasis on Verdiana’s connection to the community of Castelfiorentino in Lorenzo Giacomini’s.
