= Vallombrosa Abbey =

Benedictine abbey in Reggello, Tuscany, Italy

Coordinates: 43°43′55″N 11°33′28″E

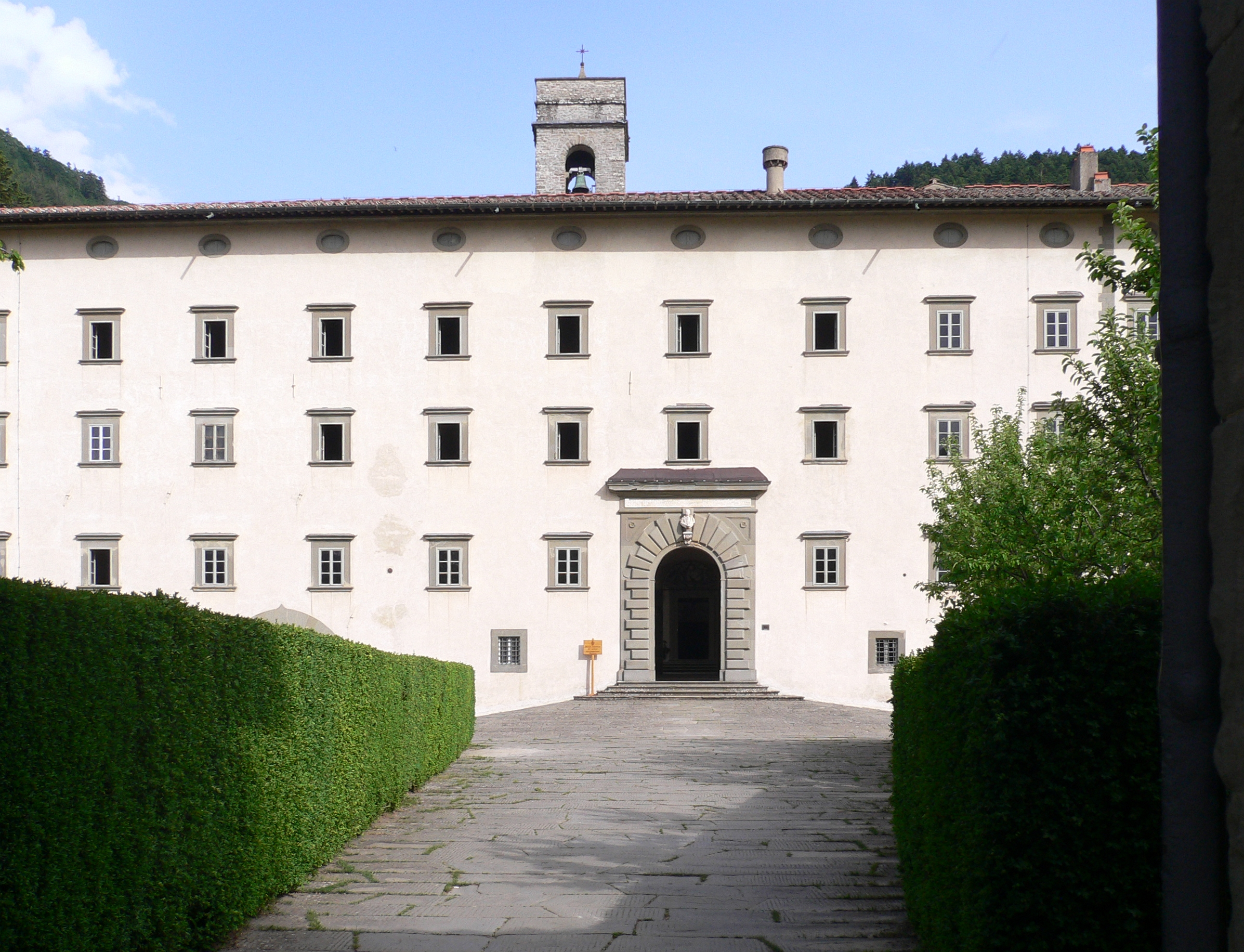
Abbey of Vallombrosa

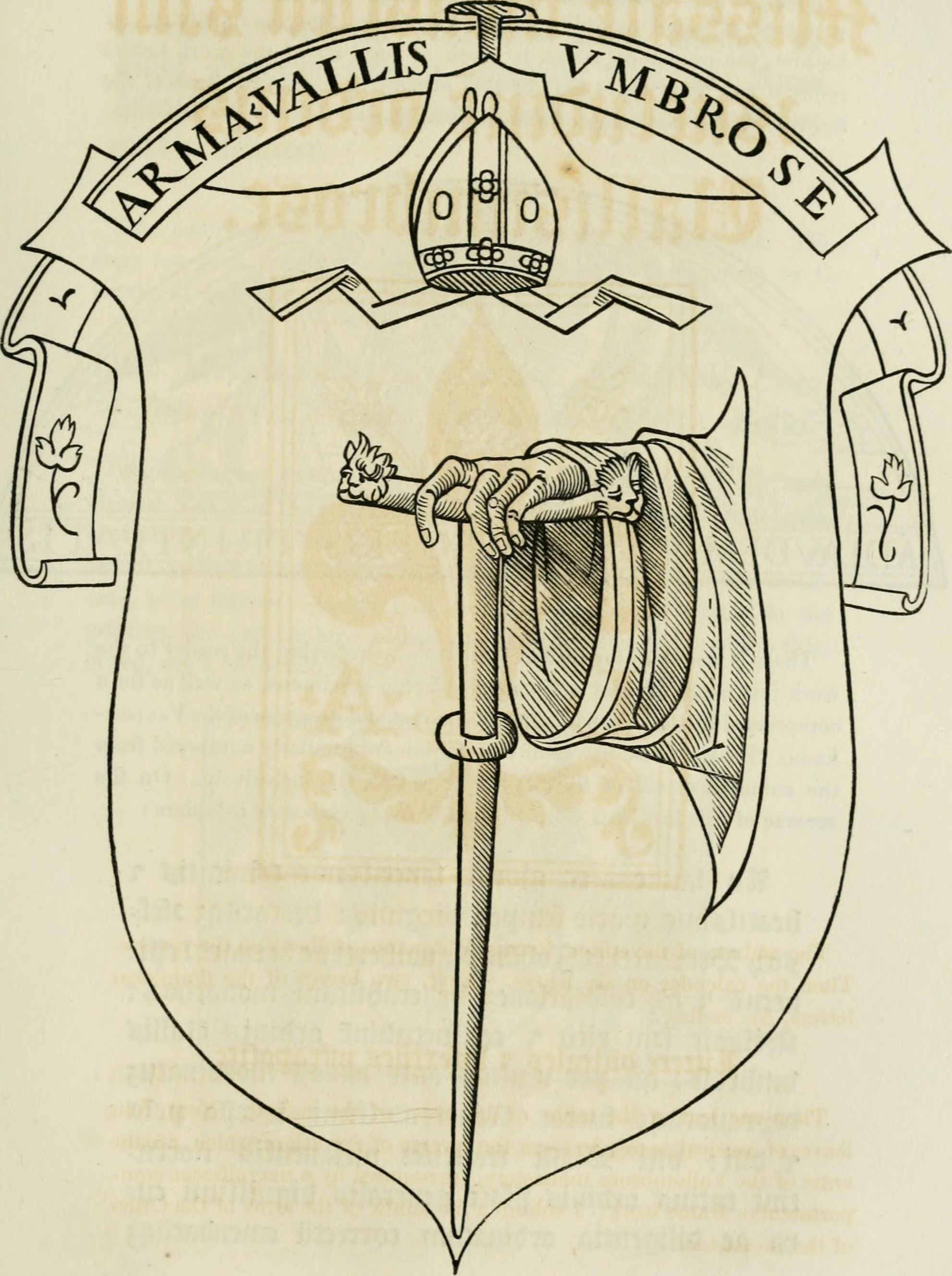
The arms of the abbey, reproduced from a missal in 1822

Vallombrosa is a Benedictine abbey in the comune of Reggello (Tuscany, Italy), about 30 km south-east of Florence, in the Apennines, surrounded by forests of beech and firs. It was founded by Florentine nobleman Giovanni Gualberto in 1038 and became the mother house of the Vallumbrosan Order.

== History ==
What began as a hermit's small wooden hut was followed by a built stone church in 1058. This was enlarged around 1450 and took on its current appearance at the end of the 15th century. In 1529, after the looting by Charles V, the east tower was built. Between 1575 and 1578, Galileo Galilei was educated there and then withdrawn by his father, before taking orders, and moved to Pisa to study medicine. In the 17th century the walls were erected, and in the 18th century the fishing ponds dug. Today the monastery is open to tourists and its "Antica Farmacia" sells local produce such as herbal teas and liqueurs made following antique recipes. Among these is the rare and legendary Dry Gin of Vallombrosa.

On 7 October 1096, Pope Urban II addressed the congregation of Vallombrosa, imploring the religious amongst them to support the cause for a crusade to the Holy Land. In particular in this sermon, he cited the need for knights, who could "restore the Christians to their former freedom".^{1}

Largely because of his poetic reference to the "autumnal leaves that strow the brooks, in Vallombrosa" in Paradise Lost, John Milton is supposed to have visited the monastery and, according to a plaque erected during the Fascist era, actually stayed there. Though this is unlikely, the notion that he did so encouraged many later travelers to visit the place, including William Beckford, J. R. Cozens, William Wordsworth, Crabb Robinson, Frances Trollope, Mary Shelley, Elizabeth Barrett Browning, and Friedrich Nietzsche. The Anglo-Italian monk, Enrico Hugford, became Abbot of Vallombrosa in 1743 and fellow Catholic, John Talman, seems to have visited even earlier.

Derek Walcott also mentions Vallombrosa in chapter 33 section 2 of his Omeros. Derek Walcott has allusions to several historical moments and other literary works throughout the Omeros, and Shmoop suggests that this reference was inspired by John Milton.

Partly thanks to the influence of the pioneering American ecologist and author of the 1864 Man and Nature, George Perkins Marsh, the Istituto Superiore Forestale Nazionale was founded in the secularized monastery in 1867.

== The exterior ==
The exterior retains the 12th century belltower and a 15th-century tower. It maintains a sobriety appropriate for a monastery. It is a walled precinct, accessed through an 18th-century gate. The facade was designed (1637) by Gherardo Silvani who completed designs by Alfonso Parigi; Silvani also completed the facade of the church (1644).

== The church interior ==
The interior of the church was frescoed (1779–1781) by Giuseppe Antonio Fabrini. The main altar has an Assumption by the Volterrano, The altar of the left transept has a Trinity by Lorenzo Lippi; other altarpieces are by Agostino Veracini, Antonio Puglieschi, Niccolò Lapi. In the Baptistery (once chapel of the Converted) is a Conversion of Saul by Cesare Dandini and in the chapel of San Giovanni Gualberto, a fresco by Alessandro Gherardini, the scagliola altar was Ignazio Hugford, a canvas by Antonio Franchi. Offertories before this altar were made by members of the Forest Service who have San Giovanni Gualberto as their patron saint.

The wooden choir to the right of the main altar was fashioned by Francesco da Poggibonsi (1444–1446); the reliquary has the arm of the saint who founded the Vallombrosan order by Paolo Sogliano (1500). The sacristy has an altarpiece by Raffaellino del Garbo depicting San Giovanni Gualberto and other saints (1508), and a great terracotta altarpiece from the studio of Andrea della Robbia; the refectory has a series of canvases by Ignazio Hugford (1745); the antirefectory has a large painting by Santi Buglioni and a cycle of paintings (three triptychs) by Mario Francesconi.

== The Museum of Sacred Art ==
Inaugurated in 2006, the museum is located on the right side of the abbey complex. It houses works of art such as the 15th-16th century Altoviti Set with embroidered fabric, the great altarpiece by Domenico Ghirlandaio and workshop (Madonna with Child and Four Saints), a selection of paintings, and the scagliolas by the 18th-century abbot Enrico Hugford (brother of the painter Ignazio).

== Other activities ==
The spruces of the closest forest of Vallombrosa were used in the 15th century to build up the first Italian Masonic Lodge in via Maggio, Florence.

In 2017, the Vallombrosa Abbey hosted the Italian Red Cross national meeting on its history.

== See also ==
- Arboreti di Vallombrosa
