= Ignazio Hugford =

Italian painter (1703–1778)

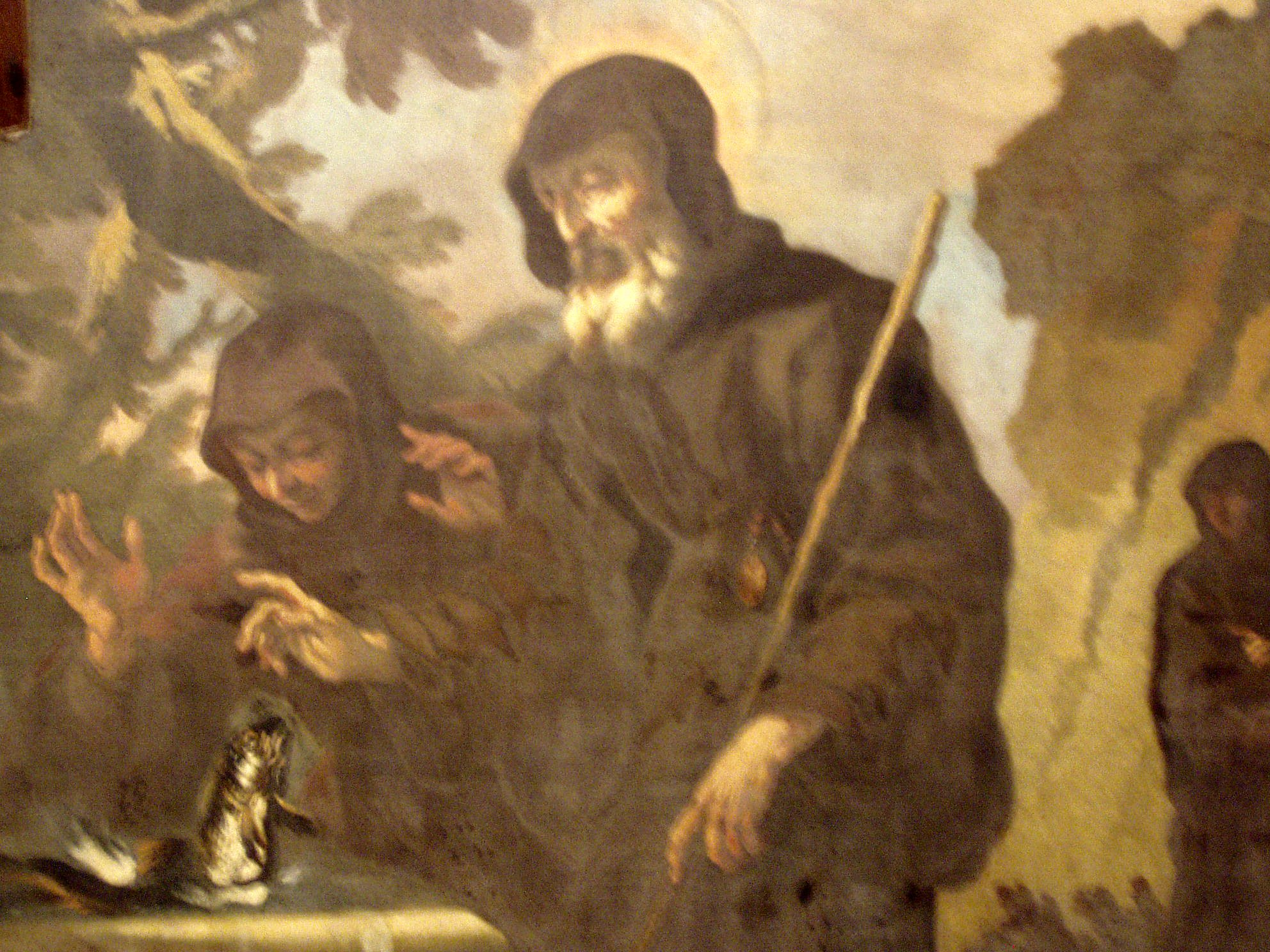
A miracle of St. Francis of Paola by Hugford.

Ignazio Hugford, or Ignatius Heckford (1703–1778), was an Italian painter active mostly in Tuscany in an early Neoclassic style.

== Biography ==
=== Life and artistic career ===
Ignazio Hugford was born in Pisa, the son of a resident English watchmaker who worked for the House of Medici. He studied painting with Anton Domenico Gabbiani (whose life he later wrote). Like his master, he specialized as a religious painter and copyist, but such works as The Annunciation (Florence, San Jacopo sopr'Arno) are no more than competent reworkings of Gabbiani, and Hugford enjoyed only local fame. In 1729 he became a member of the Accademia delle Arti del Disegno (and in 1762 was elected its provveditore). In 1745, he painted over a dozen canvases for the refectory of the Benedictine Abbey of Vallombrosa, where his brother, Ferdinando Enrico, became abbot. Hugford was also instrumental in the development of techniques for scagliola. Hugford also taught at the Accademia di San Luca, where Francesco Bartolozzi, Lamberto Cristiano Gori, Giovanni Battista Cipriani and Sante Pacini were among his pupils. Among his masterpieces in painting is the Countess Matilde Donates her Riches to the Church in the church of San Bartolommeo in Pantano in Pistoia. In the same Pistoiese church are canvasses of St. Peter crosses the fire and Sant'Atto receives the relics of San Jacopo. The Pieve di S. Andrea a Doccia houses an altarpiece of Saints Charles Borromeo, Philip Neri and Antonio Abate before a Crucifix (1776). His Tobias Returns Sight to his Father (c. 1741) can be found in the Church of Santa Felicita, Florence.

=== Art collector ===
Nowadays Hugford is more known as a critic, art scholar, and for his efforts as an agent for collectors. In the late 1720s he began to form a collection of paintings, engravings and drawings and to act as an intermediary and dealer in art. In 1729 and 1737 he exhibited a collection of drawings that he attributed to Hans Holbein the Younger the younger. These have since been identified as French drawings of the school of François Clouet, which had been sorted and annotated by Catherine de' Medici, and which Hugford must have acquired through Gian Gastone de' Medici, Grand Duke of Tuscany; there is a large collection of these drawings in the Musée Condé, Château de Chantilly. Hugford sold many of the ‘Holbein’ drawings to English collectors, such as Horace Mann who in 1740 bought some of them on behalf of Horace Walpole. Subsequently Hugford became celebrated as a dealer in and collector of Italian paintings of the Quattrocento. Although his activities in this field are not yet fully documented, he certainly owned in 1767 a Self-portrait by Masaccio (now thought to be by Filippino Lippi), and a St. Augustine by Lippi (now thought to be by Botticelli; both paintings Florence, Uffizi). Some 3000 of Hugford’s large collection of drawings were bought in 1779 from his executor by the Uffizi.

Hugford’s elder brother, Ferdinando Enrico (Don Enrico) Hugford (1695–1771) a Benedictine monk, was also an artist, working in Scagliola.
