= John Gualbert =

Italian Roman Catholic saint

Saint Giovanni Gualberto
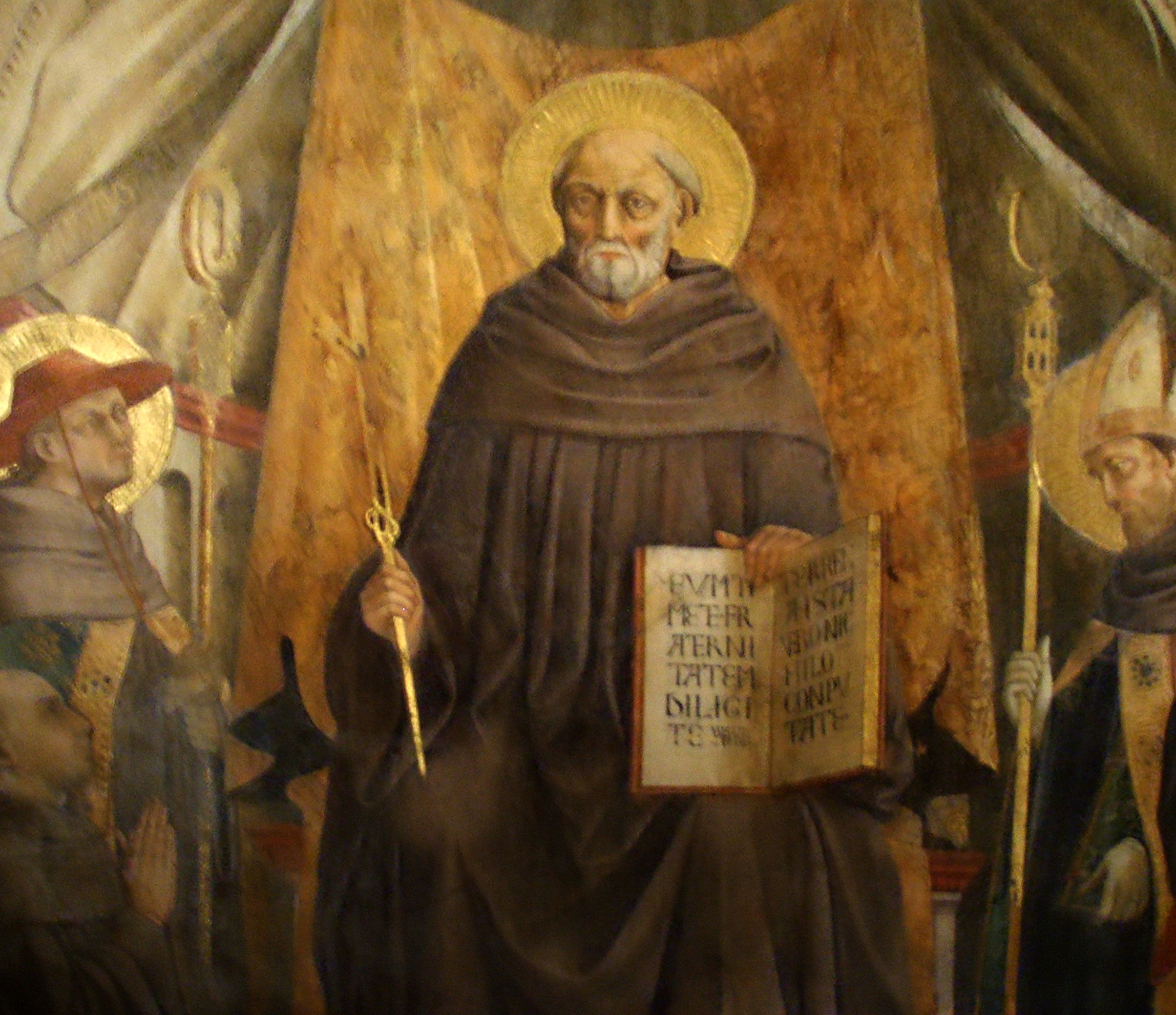
- St. John Gualbert – Neri di Bicci (in Santa Trinita in Florence)

Abbot Confessor
- Born: c. 985; Florence, Tuscan Margrave
- Died: 12 July 1073 (aged 88); Badia di Passignano, Tavarnelle Val di Pesa, Florence, Tuscan Margrave
- Venerated in: Roman Catholic Church
- Canonized: 24 October 1193, Old Saint Peter's Basilica, Papal States by Pope Celestine III
- Feast: 12 July
- Attributes: Benedictine habit
- Patronage: Forest workers; Foresters; Park rangers; Parks; Badia di Passignano; Vallumbrosan Order; Italian Forest Corps; Brazilian forests

Giovanni Gualberto (c. 985 – 12 July 1073) was an Italian Roman Catholic abbot and the founder of the Vallumbrosan Order. Born into a noble family, Gualberto was a predictably vain individual who sought pleasure in vanities and romantic intrigues. When his older brother Ugo was murdered, Gualberto set out for revenge. He found the murderer in Florence, but as it was Good Friday, granted the killer's plea for mercy. Soon after Gualberto became a member of the Order of Saint Benedict though he left in order to found his own congregation. He condemned nepotism and all simoniacal actions and was known for the pureness and meekness of his faith. Even popes held him in high esteem.

Miracles were reported at his tomb after his death. Pope Celestine III canonized Gualberto on 24 October 1193.

== Life ==
Giovanni Gualberto was born circa 985 to nobles who hailed from the Visdomini house; he was born in the castle known as Poggio Petroio. His sole sibling was his older brother Ugo. He was also related to Pietro Igneo.

He was educated and raised Catholic but in his adolescence cared little for religion. He was instead focused on frivolous things and was concerned with vain amusements and romantic intrigues. When his brother Ugo was murdered, Gualbert set out to avenge his death.

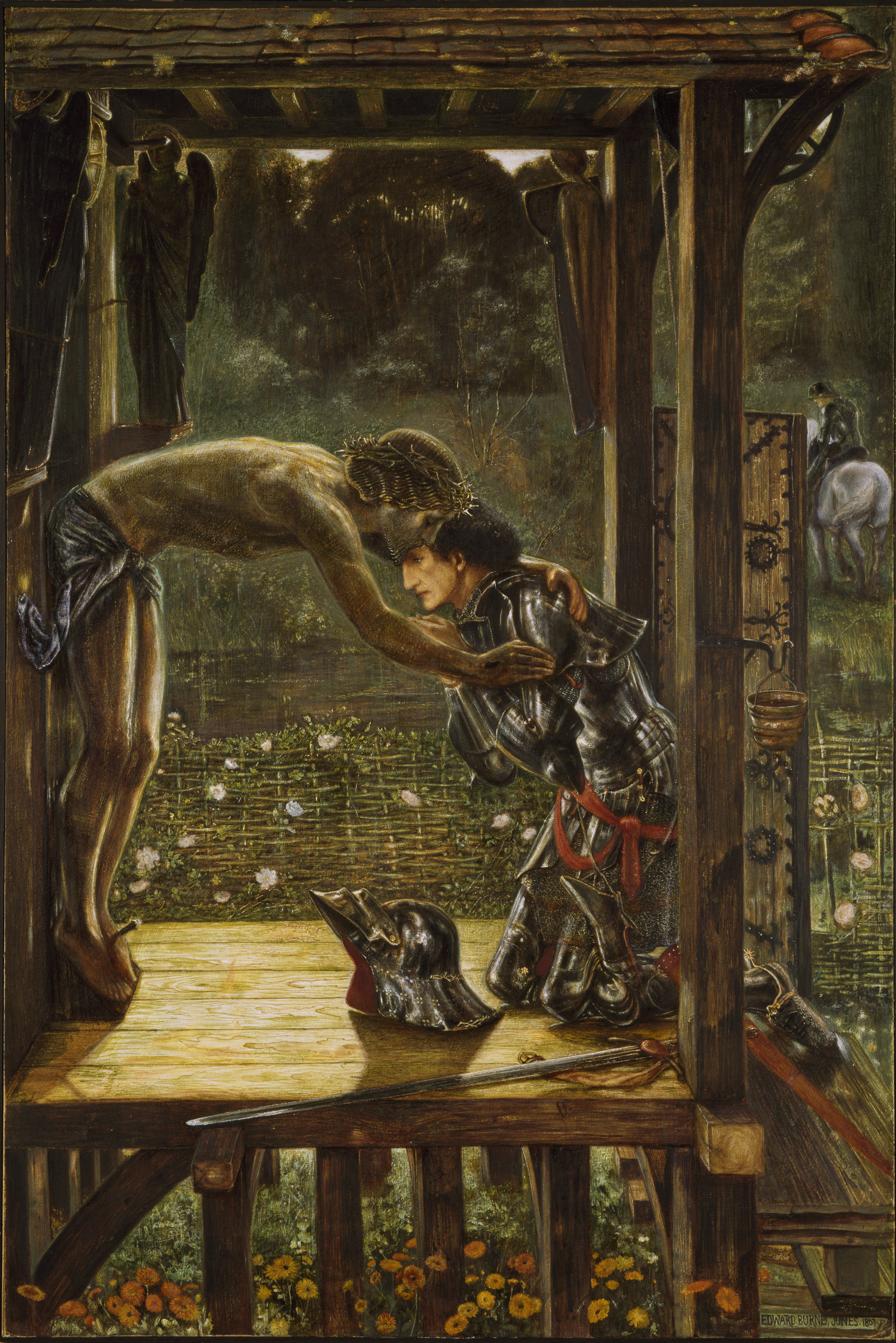
Edward Burne-Jones – The Merciful Knight

One Good Friday as he was entering Florence with his armed followers, he happened, in a narrow lane, to come upon the man who had killed his brother. The killer fell upon his knees with arms outstretched in the form of a cross and begged for mercy in the name of Jesus, reminding Gualbert that Christ had died on that day. Gualberto granted him mercy and renounced his revenge.

John Gualbert.pine.tree.sculpture, Supraśl Knyszyn Forest, Poland, 2019

Gualbert entered the Benedictine church at San Miniato al Monte to pray and the figure on the crucifix is said to have bowed its head to him in recognition of his generous and merciful act. Gualbert begged pardon of his sins and that week cut off his hair and began to wear an old habit that he had borrowed. This tale forms the subject of Burne-Jones's picture "The Merciful Knight" and Shorthouse adapted this in "John Inglesant".

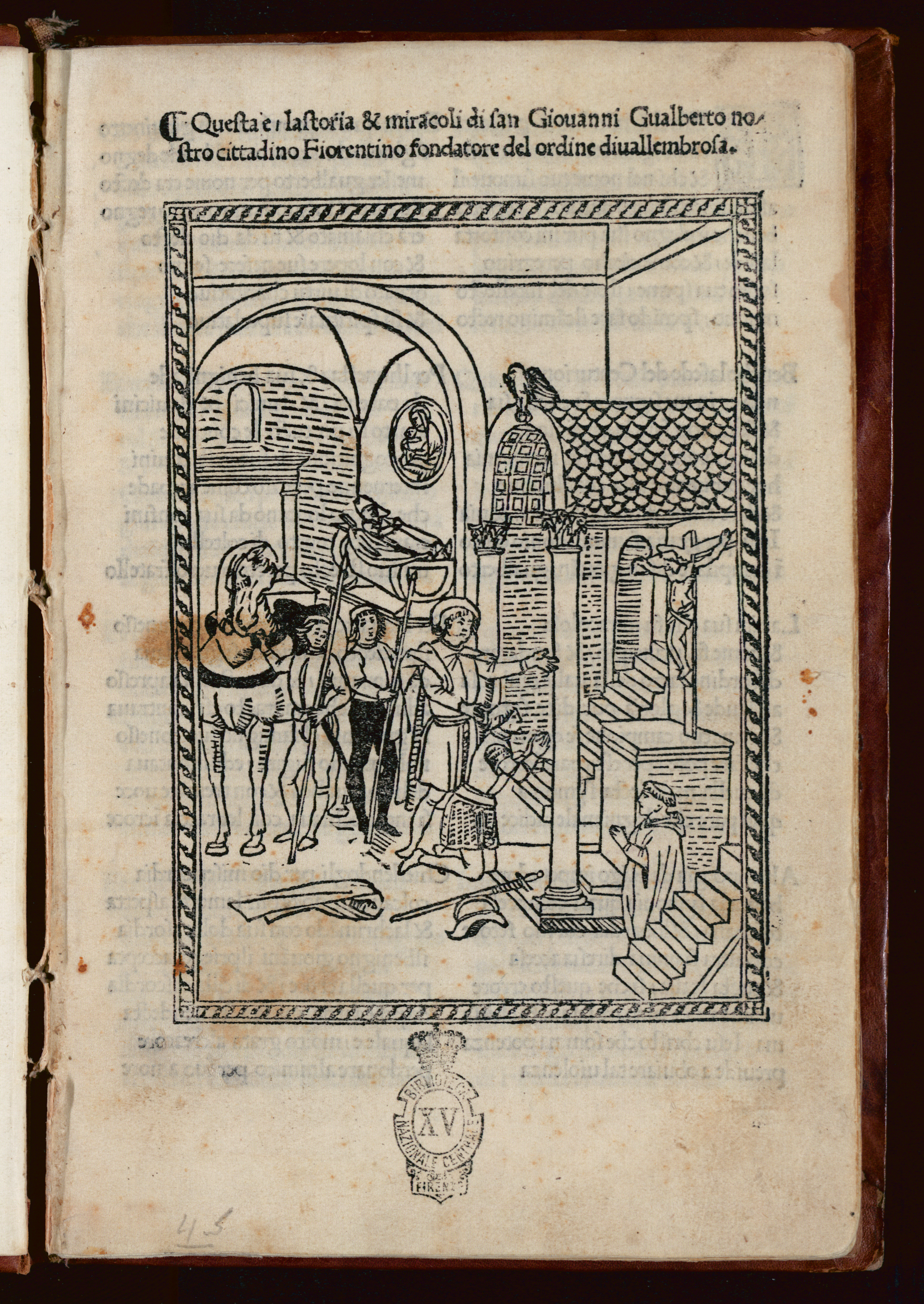
Bernardo Giambullari, Storia e miracoli di San Giovanni Gualberto, ca. 1500

Gualberto became a Benedictine monk at San Miniato despite his father's opposition. His father hastened to find his son but gave him his blessing when he heard his son's arguments and saw that he was resolute in his decision. But he counselled his son to do good. He fought against simoniacal actions of which both his abbot Oberto and the Bishop of Florence Pietro Mezzabarba were accused and their guilt discovered. Unwilling to compromise, he left to find a more solitary and strict life. He often fasted and imposed other strict penances on himself. His attraction was for the cenobitic and not eremitic life so after he spent some time with the monks at Camaldoli, but later settled at Vallombrosa where he founded his own convent in 1036. Instead of a traditional garden he opted to have his monks plant trees (firs and pines for the most part). He founded additional convents for his order in locations such as Rozzuolo and San Salvi.

He became a noted figure for his compassion to the poor and the ill. Pope Leo IX travelled to Vallombrosa to see the monk. Pope Stephen IX and Pope Alexander II held him in the greatest esteem as did Pope Gregory VII who praised Gualberto for the pureness and meekness of his faith as a staunch example of compassion and goodness. Gualberto also admired the teachings of the Church Fathers as well as Basil of Caesarea and Benedict of Nursia in particular. He never wished to be ordained to the priesthood and nor did he even wish to receive the minor orders.

Gualbert died at the age of 88, in 1073.

== Vallombrosians ==
The holy lives of the first monks at Vallombrosa attracted considerable attention and brought many requests for new foundations, but there were few postulants, since few could endure the extraordinary austerity of the life. Thus only one other monastery, that of San Salvi at Florence, was founded during this period. But when the founder had mitigated his rule somewhat, three more monasteries were founded and three others reformed and united to the order during his lifetime. In the struggle of the popes against simony the early Vallumbrosans took a considerable part, of which the most famous incident is the ordeal by fire undertaken successfully by St. Peter Igneus in 1068. Shortly before this the monastery of S. Salvi had been burned and the monks ill-treated by the anti-reform party. These events still further increased the repute of Vallombrosa. A Bull of Pope Urban II in 1090, which takes Vallombrosa under the protection of the Holy See, enumerates fifteen monasteries besides the motherhouse.

== Veneration ==
Gualbert was canonized by Pope Celestine III on 24 October 1193.

His liturgical feast was not included in the Tridentine calendar but was later added to the General Roman Calendar in 1595. Owing to its limited worldwide importance his feast was removed from that calendar in 1969. The date assigned for his feast still remains as indicated in the Roman calendar and according to the new rules given in the Roman Missal in 1969 could still be celebrated across the globe with his own Mass unless in some places an important celebration is assigned and thus coincides.

The Benedictines observe his day as an Optional Memorial.

Gualberto is the patron saint for foresters and also is the patron for park rangers and parks. Pope Pius XII named him – in 1951 – as the patron saint for the Italian Forest Corps while he was named as the patron for Brazilian forests in 1957.

== See also ==
- Astino Abbey

== Sources ==
- F. Salvestrini, Disciplina Caritatis, Il monachesimo vallombrosano tra medioevo e prima età moderna, Rome, Viella, 2008.
- F. Salvestrini, Santa Maria di Vallombrosa. Patrimonio e vita economica di un grande monastero medievale, Florence, Olschki, 1998.
- Salvestrini, F. (2010). Santa Vallombrosani in Liguria. Storia di una presenza monastica fra Dodicesimo e Diciassettesimo secolo. Rome: Viella.
- F. Salvestrini, ed. (2011). I Vallombrosani in Lombardia (XI-XVIII secolo). Milan-Lecco: ERSAF.
