= Pratomagno =

Mountain in Italy

Coordinates: 43°39′N 11°39′E

The Pratomagno is a mountain range, which has the Arno River on both sides: to the west is the upper Valdarno and to the east is the Casentino. It lies north-west of the city of Arezzo, in Tuscany, Italy.

Its highest peak has an elevation of 1,592 m.

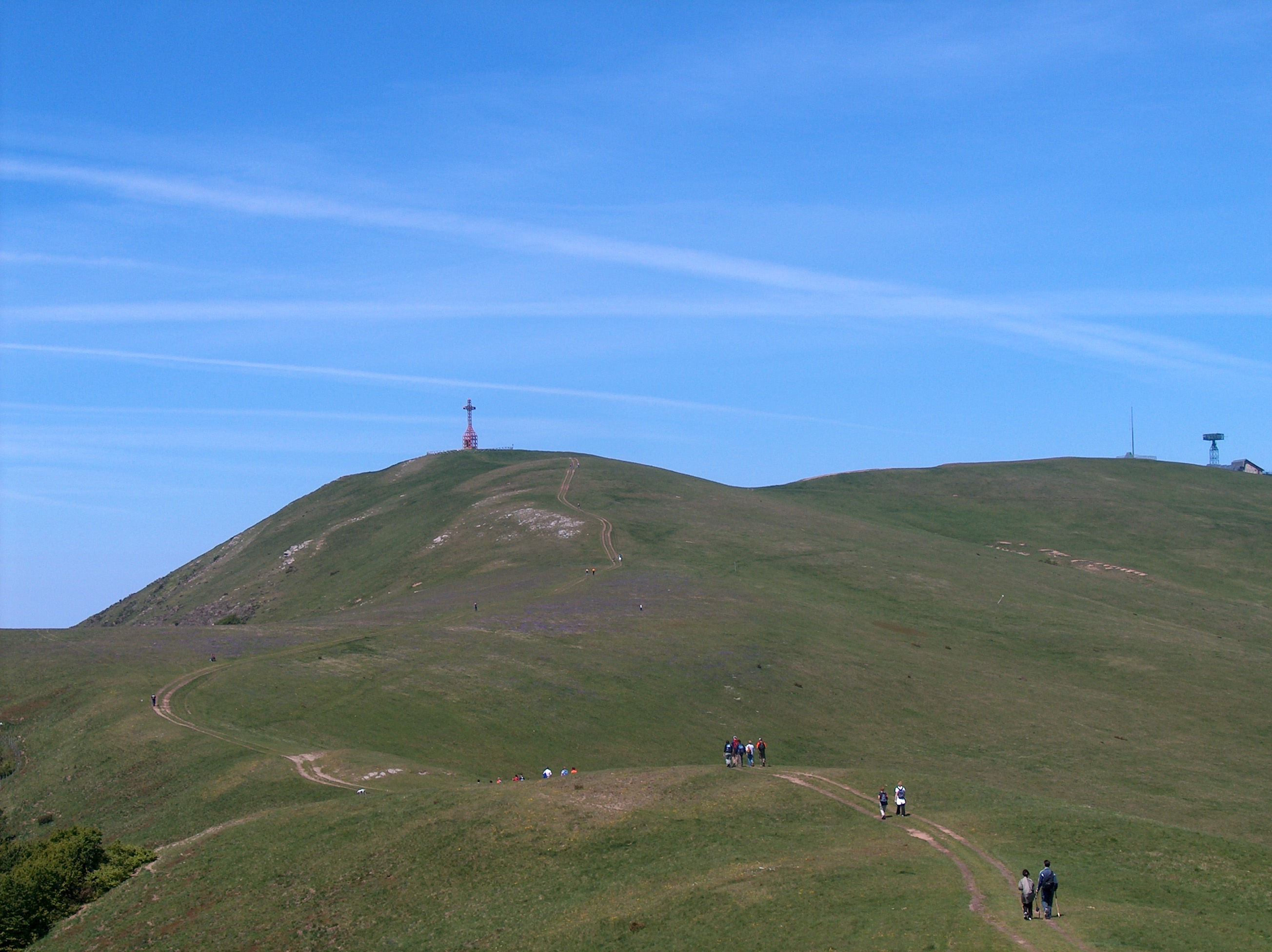
Croce Pratomagno

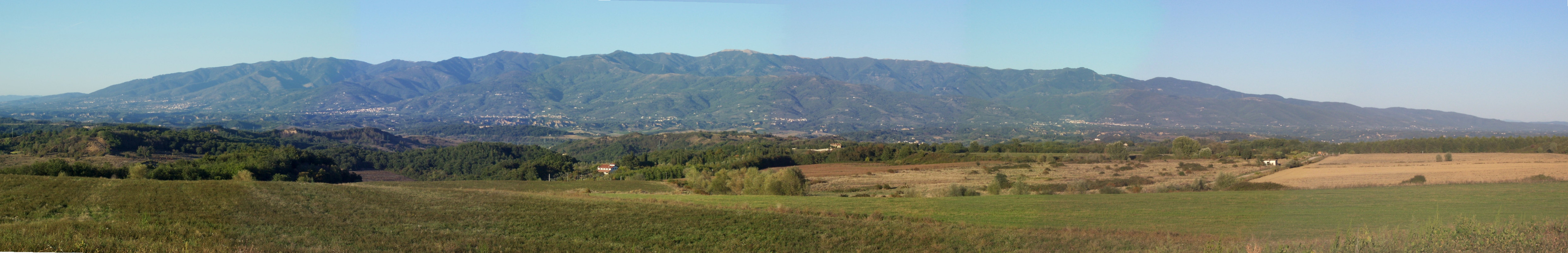
