= San Salvi =

Church in Florence

Coordinates: 43.772104°N 11.286113°E

Church of San Michele a San Salvi (Chiesa di San Michele in San Salvi)
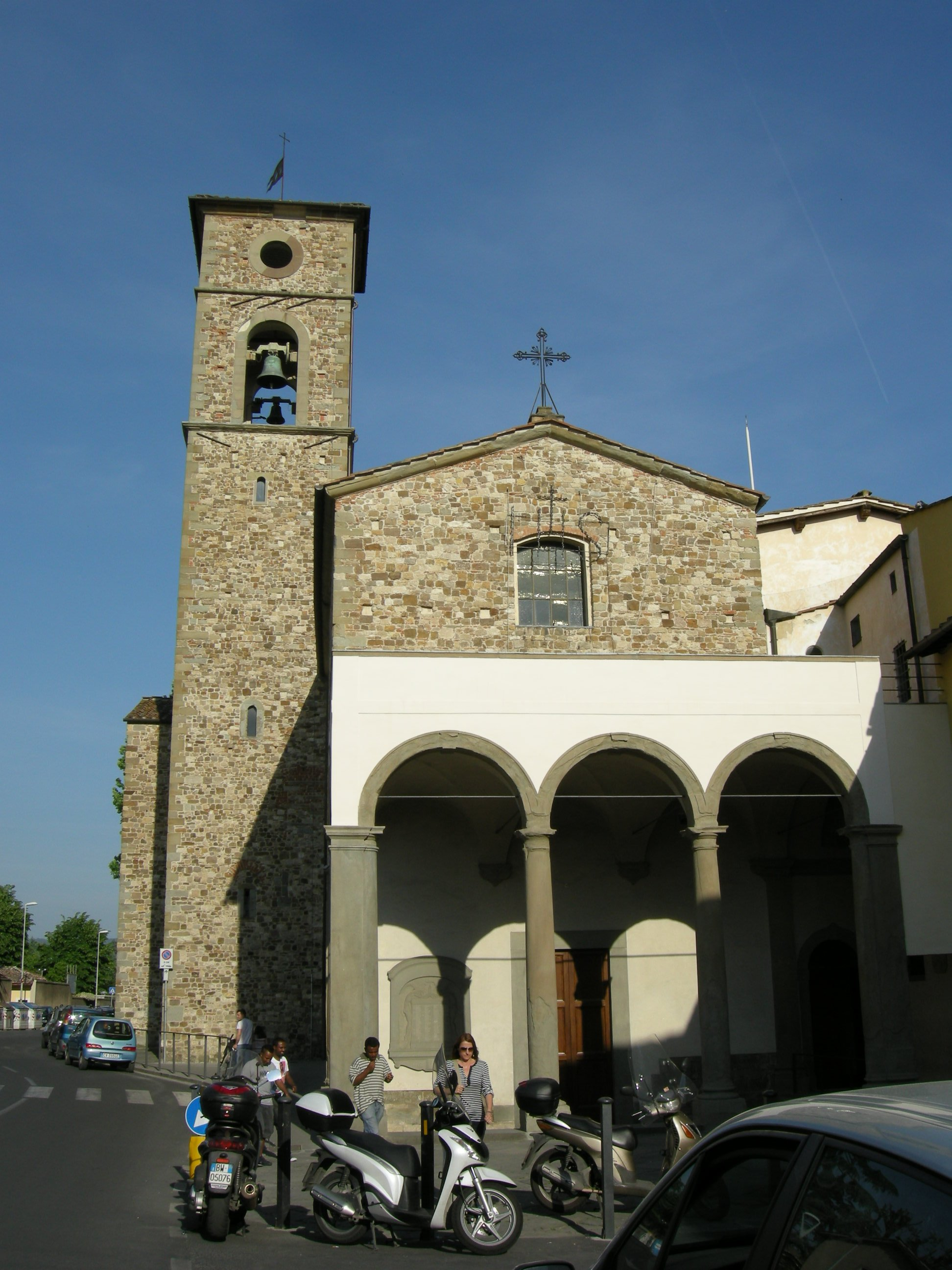
- San Salvi in Florence

Religion
- Affiliation: Roman Catholic
- Province: Florence

Location
- Location: Florence, Italy
- Interactive map of Church of San Michele a San Salvi (Chiesa di San Michele in San Salvi)

Architecture
- Type: Church

San Salvi, also known as San Michele a San Salvi, is a church in Florence, Italy.

The church was built in the 11th century by the Vallombrosans as part of an abbey complex. During the 1529 Siege of Florence, the church was partially destroyed. It was reconstructed in accordance with its original style with the exception of the portico which was built with a 16th-century style. The interior of the church is of a single aisle, Latin-cross design with a rectangular apse. The refectory contains a masterwork fresco of the Last Supper (1519–1527) by Andrea del Sarto.
