= Vallombrosa =

Hamlet in Reggello, Tuscany, Italy

Coordinates: 43°44′N 11°32′E

Vallombrosa is a toponym which indicates both a forest and a frazione, located within this forest, in the territory of the Commune of Reggello, in the Metropolitan City of Florence, in the Italian region of Tuscany.

The village of Vallombrosa ('shaded valley') lies among forests, and was originally the location of a hermitage dedicated to Santa Maria d'Acquabella. Later, the large Vallombrosa Abbey of the Benedictines was built and remains a major landmark of the region.

The Reggello Vallombrosa meteorological station is located there.

In the Vallombrosa area lies a nature reserve of the same name, as well as the renowned Vallombrosa Arboretum and a vast lawn, very popular in the summer period, especially by the inhabitants of Florence looking for rustic relaxation.

== As a tourist destination ==
The fame of the Vallombrosa-Saltino complex as a health resort was born in the second half of 19th century, and reached its peak at the beginning of the 20th century, thanks in part to the Sant'Ellero-Saltino railway, long since abandoned.

Italy's annexation of Trentino following World War I led to a decided loss of interest for Vallombrosa and Saltino, as Italian vacationers preferred the new Alpine destinations, relegating those two vacation spots to a local interest.

Despite this constant decline, the town seemed to find, starting in 1960, a tourist revitalization with the construction of a ski resort on the peak of the neighboring Monte Secchieta. The natural ski area that was created allowed Vallombrosa, thanks to its proximity to Florence, to offer an elitist tourist image compared to other mountain tourist resorts in Tuscany. The closure of the ski facilities, which took place in 1988, was not followed up, partially due to lively controversy over the environmental damage that might result from invasive plant species. The closure left the site without the possibility of offering alternatives to tourists in the winter period.

== The forest ==
After the creation of the Kingdom of Italy, the Vallombrosa forest was transferred to the State and in 1977 it was declared a Biogenetic Nature Reserve. Until 2016, it was managed by the State Forestry Corps and subsequently by the Biodiversity Department of the Vallombrosa Carabinieri.

Today it is a Protected Natural Area of 1,279 hectares where there are numerous hiking trails, many of which are also suitable for horseback riding or mountain biking. The trail network is connected with the paths of the Forest of Sant'Antonio, with the lower valley of the Upper Valdarno and with the Park of the Casentino Forests.

The Reserve hosts the Experimental Arboretums and the tallest tree in Italy, a 62.45-meter-tall Douglas fir called The Italian Tree King.

== In art ==
- Pala di Vallombrosa, Pietro Perugino (1500)
- Wall mural in Grossi Florentino, executed by students of Napier Waller under supervision
- Vallambrosa Apartment-House, "The Third Ingredient", O. Henry

== See also ==
- List of national parks of Italy
