= 1088 papal election =

Election of Catholic Pope Urban II

Papal election 1088

Dates and location
- 12 March 1088; Santi Pietro e Cesareo, Terracina

Elected pope
- Odon de Lagery; Name taken: Urban II
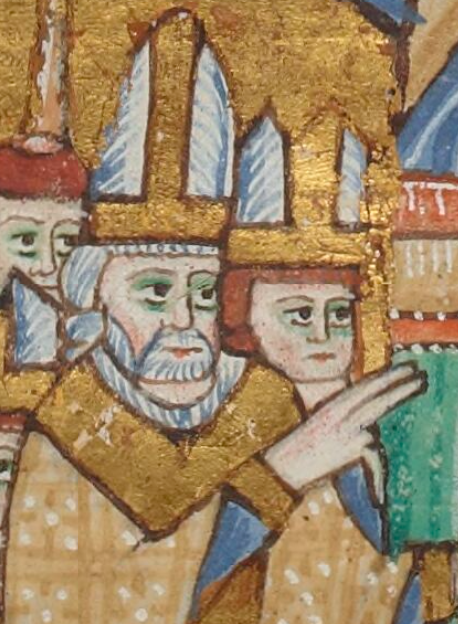

The 1088 papal election subsequent to the death of Pope Victor III in 1087 was held on 12 March 1088. Six cardinal-bishops, assisted by two lower-ranking cardinals, elected Cardinal-Bishop of Ostia Odon de Lagery as the new Pope. He assumed the name Urban II.

== Background ==
Pope Victor III died on 16 September 1087 at Montecassino. Shortly before his death he recommended the election of Cardinal Odon de Lagery as his successor. For six months, the Obedience of Victor III was without a pope. Rome at that time was under control of Antipope Clement III, who was supported by the Emperor Henry IV of Germany, and there was no hope for its quick recovery. In this situation the adherents of Victor III assembled on 9 March 1088 at Terracina, under the protection of the Norman army of Roger I of Sicily, to elect the new pope. Besides the cardinal-bishops, who nominated the candidate for election, there were present also at the electoral assembly in the cathedral of SS. Pietro e Cesareo the representatives of the two other orders of cardinals, more than 40 bishops and abbots, as well as Benedetto, prefect of Rome and Countess Matilda of Tuscany. Bishop Joannes of Tusculum arose in the midst of the crowded church, and addressed those assembled about the actions of Pope Gregory VII and Pope Victor III de ordinanda ecclesiae, and likewise about the reasons why they were gathered at that place at that time. Then Bishop Joannes of Porto and Benedict the Prefect of the City of Rome arose, and announced that they held powers from the clergy and from the laity of the city in this matter.

== Election ==
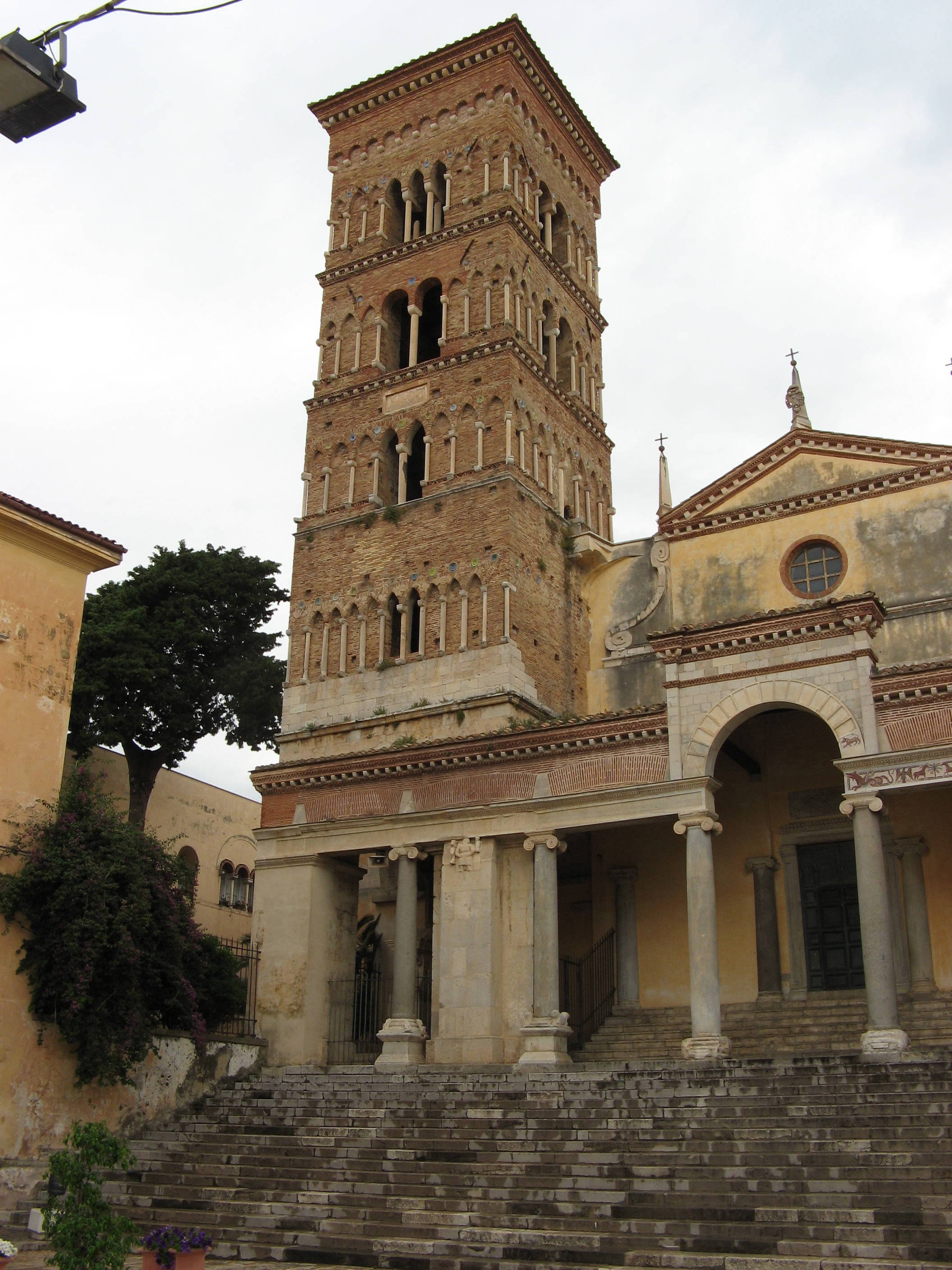
The tower of Terracina Cathedral

The usual three days of fasting and prayer were proclaimed, and the meeting adjourned until Sunday 12 March. On that day the cardinals and the rest of the present churchmen and laymen reassembled in the same church. The bishops of Albano, Tusculum and Porto together proposed the election of Odon de Lagery (Odo de Châtillon), Bishop of Ostia, who had been designated by Victor III. Cardinal Rainerius assented on behalf of the other cardinal-priests. Oderisius of Montecassino spoke for the deacons. Benedict, the Prefect of Rome, spoke for the people of Rome.

Odo accepted his election and took the name Urban II. The name chosen by the new pope after his election was publicly announced by Peter Igneus, Bishop of Albano. On the same day, the new Pope was enthroned and celebrated the inauguration mass. However, it was not until November 1088 that Urban II was able to travel to Rome.

== Cardinal-electors ==
According to the decree of Pope Nicholas II In Nomine Domini (1059), Cardinal-Bishops of the suburbicarian sees were those who deliberated over the candidate to be nominated. In March 1088 there were four or five Cardinal Bishops. The presence of five bishops, including Bruno of Segni, is guaranteed by the letter of the newly elected pope, Urban II, to the archbishop of Salzburg, (Note: Watterich I, p. 575: "Nosse volumus beatitudinem vestram, quae circa nos gesta sunt noviter: reverentissimi siquidem fratres nostri episcopi et cardinales, Saviensis videlicet, Tusculanensis, Albanensis, Signensis praeterea & Portuensis legationem & consensum, & petitionem ferens omnium fidelium laicorum nostrae parti faventium clericorum Romae eligentium, & religiosissimus abbas Cassinensis omnium diaconorum, & R. cardinalis tituli S. Clementis omnium cardinalium, necnon & B. praefectus omnium fidelium laicorum, una cum XX.& I. episcopis & quatuor abbatibus apud Terracinam coadunati, & triduano jejunio cum multis precibuys communiter celebrato, dominico tandem die IV. idus Martii mihi omnium indignissimo contra omne votum et desiderium, Deus scit, & plurimum renitenti regimen sedis apostolicae commisere, & omnium tam praesentium quam & absentium praedictorum fidelium consensu me eligentes, & auctoritatem atque imperium sanctae memoriae praedecessorum meorum Gregorii & Victoris habere se super hoc asserentes, longe impar viribus meis imposuerunt.") where he mentions all of the participants in the events at Terracina. A similar, but not identical, letter (Note: J.P. Migne, Patrologiae Latinae Cursus Completus Tomus 151, columns 284-285: "Quoniam sanctitatem vestram satis avidam exaltationis Romanae Ecclesiae novimus, ea quae circa nos acta sunt compendio vobis notificare curamus. Notum itaque facimus dilectioni vestrae quod apud Terracinam Campaniae civitatem sanctae Romanae Ecclesiae Episcopi et Cardinales, Portuensis videlicet, Sabinensis, Tusculanus, Albanensis, et Signensis cum aliis Episcopis numero XVI. et Abbatibus quatuor aliisque quam plurimis viris religiosis convenientes, cum Portuensis Episcopus omnium Romanorum clericorum catholicae parti faventium se legatum diceret, Abbas vero Cassinensis Cardinalis Diaconus caeterorum Diaconorum, P. quoque Cardinalis tituli Sancti Clementis omnium Cardinalium, Praefectus autem urbis laicorum omnium se ferre assereret legationem, cumque post triduanum jejunium supplicationibus multis magnisque ad Deum precibus vehementer insisterent, quod ego quidem omnino dignus non fui, tandem me sibi quarto Idus Martii [March 12, 1088] in Pontificem elegerunt." This version appears to make Bruno one of the seventeen other bishops, rather than one of the cardinal-bishops. R. Grégoire, p. 33.) was sent to the abbot of Cluny.

Elector	Title	Elevated	Elevator	Notes
Hubaldus (Ubaldo)	Bishop of Sabina	1063	Alexander II	
Giovanni Minuto	Bishop of Tusculum	c. 1073	Alexander II	Created as cardinal-priest of S. Maria in Trastevere, promotion to the suburbicarian see probably in 1073
Peter Igneus, O.S.B.Vallombrose	Bishop of Albano	c. 1072	Alexander II	He announced the election of Urban II
Odon de Lagery, O.S.B.Cluny	Bishop of Ostia	c. 1079–1082	Gregory VII	Elected Pope Urban II
Giovanni	Bishop of Porto	1085 or 1087	Gregory VII or Victor III	
Bruno	Bishop of Segni	1079	Gregory VII	Bibliothecarius Sanctae Romanae Ecclesiae. Bruno did not participate in the papal election of 1099.

== Other electors ==
Two Cardinals of non-episcopal rank, one Cardinal-Priest and one Cardinal Deacon assisted at the election:

Elector	Cardinalatial title	Elevated	Elevator	Notes
Rainiero, O.S.B.	Priest of S. Clemente	1078	Gregory VII	Abbot of the monastery of S. Lorenzo fuori le mura; future Pope Paschal II (1099-1118)
Oderisio de Marsi, O.S.B.Cas.	Deacon of the Sacred Lateran Palace (deaconry unknown)	1059	Nicholas II	Abbot of Montecassino

== Bibliography ==
- Ganzer, Klaus (1963). Die Entwicklung des auswärtigen Kardinalats im hohen Mittelalter. Ein Beitrag zur Geschichte des Kardinalkollegiums vom 11.bis 13. Jahrhundert. Bibliothek des Deutschen Historischen Instituts in Rom (in German). Tübingen: Max Niemeyer Verlag.
- Gregoire, Réginald (1965) Bruno di Segni, exégète médiéval et théologien monastique (in French) Spoleto: Centro Italiano di Studi sull'alto Medio Evo: 1965.
- Gregorovius, Ferdinand (1896). History of Rome in the Middle Ages. Volume IV, Part I. second edition, revised (London: George Bell, 1896). pp. 265–271.
- Huls, Rudolf, Kardinal, Klerus und Kirchen Roms: 1049-1130 (in German). Tübingen 1977.
- H.W. Klewitz, Reformpapsttum und Kardinalskolleg, Darmstadt 1957
- I. S. Robinson, The Papacy, 1073-1198: Continuity and Innovation, Cambridge University Press, 1990.
- Watterich, J. B. M. (1862). Pontificum Romanorum qui fuerunt inde ab exeunte saeculo IX usque ad finem saeculi XIII vitae: ab aequalibus conscriptae (in Latin). Vol. Tomus primus. Leipzig: G. Engelmann.
