= Caesarius of Terracina =

Christian martyr

Saint Caesarius of Terracina
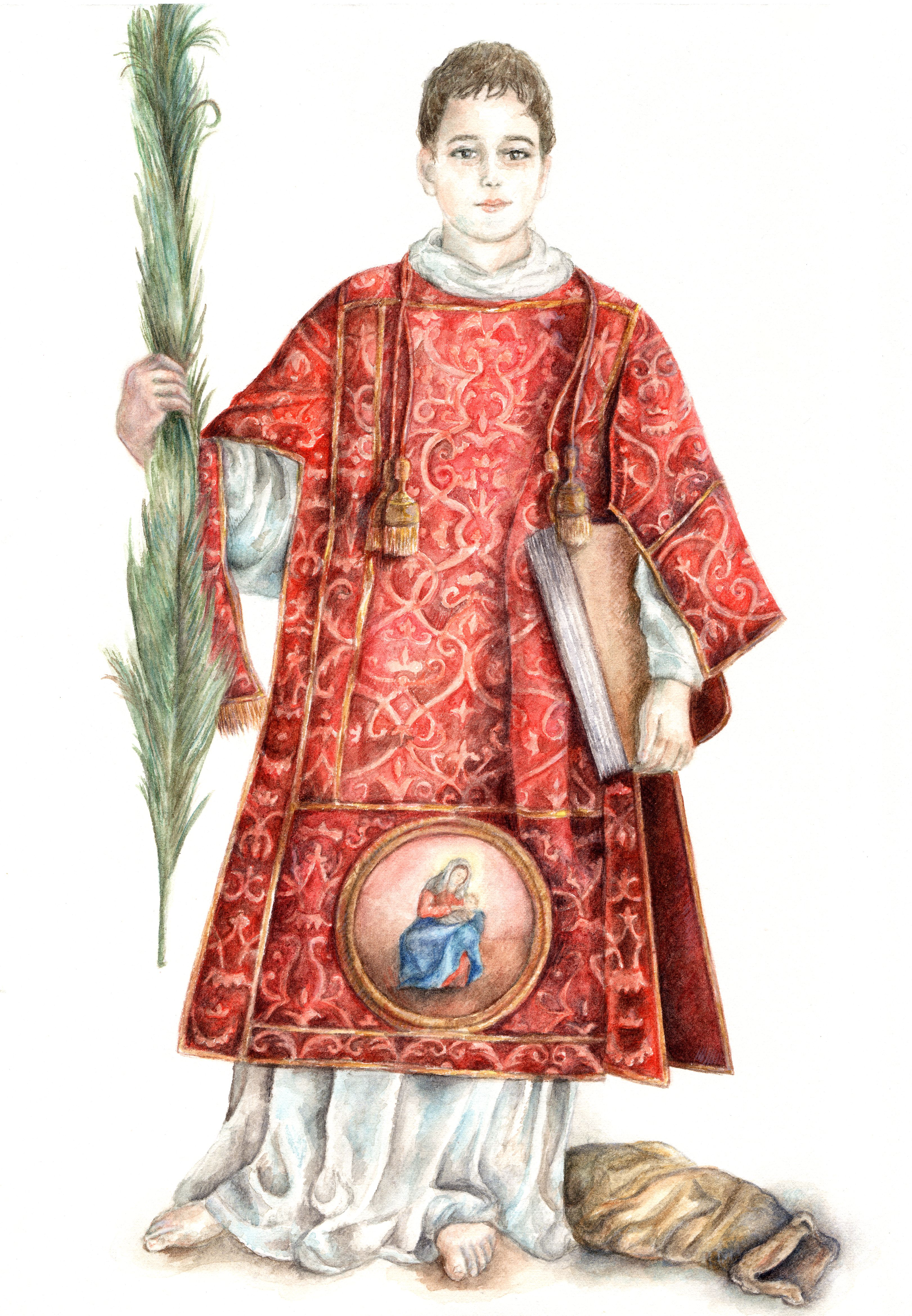

Deacon and Martyr
- Died: c. 3rd century Terracina, Italy
- Venerated in: Eastern Orthodox Church; Roman Catholic Church; Apostolic Catholic Church
- Major shrine: Terracina
- Feast: 1 November
- Attributes: palm, Gospel, sack
- Patronage: patron saint of Roman emperors, has replaced and Christianized the cult of Julius Caesar and Augustus; invoked against drowning, flooding, and for the good success of Caesarean section.

Saint Caesarius of Terracina (Italian: San Cesario Deacono, "Saint Caesarius the Deacon") was a Christian martyr. The church of San Cesareo in Palatio in Rome bears his name. He is venerated as a saint in the Eastern Orthodox Church and Roman Catholic Church, with a feast day on 1 November.

== Life ==
Caesarius was a deacon of Africa, martyred at Terracina in Italy.

The "Passio" (story of martyrdom) of Saint Caesarius is set in Terracina, harbor town near Rome and Naples, under the pagan emperor Trajan (r. 98–117).

Caesarius, belonging to the ancient and illustrious gens Julia, after a shipwreck, arrived in Terracina to preach the Gospel to poor people. In this Roman city, each year on the first day of January, a ceremony of self-immolation took place to assure the health and salvation of the Empire. A young man was pampered with material delights and fulfilled in all his wishes for eight months; then he was obliged to mount on a richly harnessed horse, climb up to the summit of city's cliff and throw himself into the void, with the recalcitrant horse, to crash against the rocks and perish in the waves in honour of the god Apollo, as a propitiatory offering for the prosperity of the state and the emperors. The deacon Caesarius denounced this pagan custom and protested: "Alas for a state and emperors who persuade by tortures and are fattened on the outpouring of blood".

The priest of Apollo named Firminus had him arrested and taken before Leontius, Roman consul of Campania. During the interrogation, he refused to sacrifice to the pagan god of the sun and light, and his prayers "caused" the temple of Apollo to collapse (located in the Forum), killing the pagan Firminus. Caesarius was then locked up in jail and, after twenty-two months, he was taken to the Forum to be judged. He asked permission to pray: a radiant light blazed down on him, and the pagan consul Leontius was thereupon converted and sought baptism; he died shortly after (October 30).

The 1st of November of the year 107 A.D., Luxurius, governor of the city, tied Caesarius and Julian (a local presbyter) up together in a sack and flung them into the sea, from a cliff called "Pisco Montano".

In this way the deacon Caesarius was martyred, although not before prophesying the death of Luxurius, bitten by a poisonous viper.

Caesarius and Julian, on that same day, were thrown back onto the shore and were buried by Eusebius, a servant of God, near the town of Terracina.

== Cult: Caesarius as an imperial saint ==
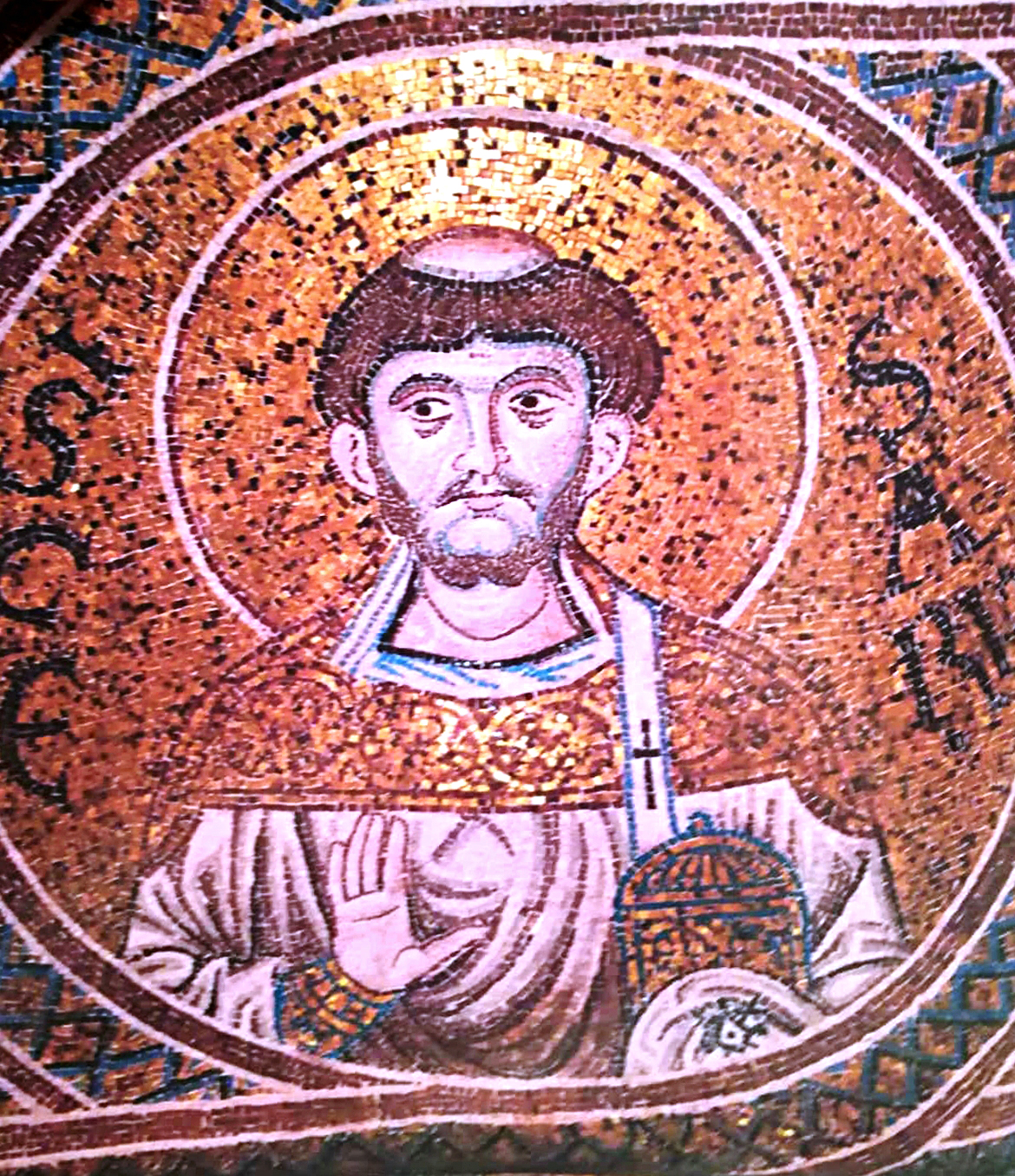
Mosaic from the Monreale Cathedral

Caesarius' feast day is 1 November. From the early Christian age, Caesarius of Terracina was the saint chosen for his name to consecrate the places that already belonged to the pagan Caesars to the faith of Christ. The name Caesarius means "devoted to Caesar" and is therefore linked to the great Roman leader Julius Caesar, and to the Roman emperors as their name was precisely "Caesar". Saint Caesarius, therefore, replaced the cult of the Caesars, very difficult to eradicate because it was founded on the national self-love of the Romans. The analogy between the name of the saint and that of the rooms called Caesareum or Augusteum, reserved in Roman public buildings for the cult of the emperors, has always been connected with the precise will of the Church to supplant devotion to the deceased sovereigns of Rome (rather important in paganism) with the one more tolerable towards a Christian martyr.

The Palatine in the Middle Ages became a ceremonial space, rarely inhabited by the designated occupant: the emperor. In the imperial palaces of the Colle we do not find a multitude of new saints, but a single saint to strengthen the imperial majesty: Saint Caesarius.

In the 4th century, the Emperor Valentinian I's daughter was healed at his shrine in Terracina. The emperor then moved his relics to Rome, first to a church on the Palatine Hill, and then to a new San Cesareo in Palatio near the Appian Way. The imperial chapel was named after Caesarius by Valentinian III. It has been noted that Caesarius's passio revolves around the good health or prosperity (salus) of the Roman Empire, borrowing the overtones of his name to suggest that the well-being of the state rested more solidly on Christian foundations than on its pagan past.

Terracina Cathedral (Cattedrale dei Santi Pietro e Cesareo) is dedicated to him and Saint Peter.

== Patron saint of caesarean sections ==
Caesarius is the protector of Caesarean sections. Saint Caesarius is invoked against river floods and drownings (in memory of his martyrdom), and for defence against lightning, earthquakes and meteorological calamities.

== Art: precious manuscripts ==
The first illustrations of the history of St. Caesarius are found in precious illuminated manuscripts. Most of these manuscripts date back to the Middle Ages.

In the British Library of London in a "Passionale", a Latin manuscript, made in 1110 for the Monastery of Saint Augustine in Canterbury (describes the lives of the Saints from September 21 to November 9), there is the text of the Passion of Saint Caesarius of Terracina with historiated initial which represents "Martyrdom of St Caesarius" (BL Arundel MS 91, f. 188r.).

In the Morgan Library of New York in the “Book of Hours”, made in 1465 in Langres, France, there is the miniature of “Saint Caesarius” (MS G.55 fol. 132v).

In the Bibliothèque nationale de France in Paris, in the Department of Manuscripts, the Speculum Historiale by Vincent of Beauvais (translation by Jean de Vignay) is kept, made in 1463. In this manuscript the "Passio S. Caesarii" is described with different miniatures of the life of the saints Caesarius and Julian.

== Relics ==
The relics of the Saint Caesarius deacon and martyr are preserved in the Basilica Santa Croce in Gerusalemme in Rome (basalt urn of high altar), in the Basilica of San Frediano of Lucca, Tuscany (urn with six bones), and in Terracina Cathedral (urn with two shins and a reliquary arm).

From March 30 to June 30, 2015, the silver reliquary arm of St. Caesarius preserved in Terracina Cathedral was exhibited at the exhibition entitled "Precious sculptures: sacred jewelry in Lazio" set up in the Braccio di Carlo Magno, in St. Peter's Square, in the Vatican, by the will of Antonio Paolucci, Director of the Vatican Museums.

During the Middle Ages, bone fragments of the saint were translated into England: in Glastonbury Abbey (his relics are listed at Glastonbury in the mid-twelfth-century list of Hugh Candidus of Peterborough), in Cathedral of Exeter and in Cathedral of Lincoln.

Saint Cesarius is venerated in St. Michael Church of Netcong, a borough in Morris County, New Jersey, United States. A bone fragment of Saint Cesarius is preserved in this church.

Other relics of Saint Caesarius deacon (with the cartouche in Latin " 1 November S. Caesarii diac. m.") are preserved in Saint Anthony's Chapel in Pittsburgh (Pennsylvania); in St. Martha Church in Morton Grove (Illinois); in St. Joseph Cathedral in Buffalo (New York); in St. Raphael's Cathedral (Dubuque, Iowa); in the Shrine of the Holy Relics in Maria Stein (Ohio); in Basilica of the Sacred Heart (Notre Dame), Indiana; in St Margaret's Chapel, Edinburgh; in a private collection in Gnesen Township, St. Louis County, Minnesota; in Basílica of São Sebastião in Rio de Janeiro; in Paróquia Nossa Senhora das Graças in Caieiras; and in the Manila Cathedral (Philippines).

An Arm Reliquary of Saint Caesarius is preserved in Kunstegewerbemuseum in Berlin.

Bone fragments of St. Caesarius (with the cartouche in Latin "S. Caesarii diac. m.") are preserved in Sancta Sanctorum of Roma, in Cathedral of Monreale (Palermo, Italy); in Treasury of the Collegiate of St. Peter and St. Alexander in the Museum of the Chapter of the Rectory of Aschaffenburg (Germany); in Essen Minster; in the Museum Frederic Marès of Barcelona; in the Museum de la Visitation, Moulins (France); in the Museum São Roque of Lisbon. In the municipality of St. Marys (Kansas, United States of America) on May 3, 2023, Bishop Bernard Fellay consecrated the main altar of the majestic Basilica of the Immaculate Conception with a first class relic of St. Caesarius deacon and martyr of Terracina and of Sant'Emerentiana (sister of Sant'Agnese)

In Italy other bone fragments of the saint are preserved in: Udine Cathedral; Naples Cathedral; Santa Brigida, Naples; Santa Maria in Vallicella; Basilica of Saint Paul Outside the Walls; Santa Maria Corteorlandini, Lucca; San Paolo Maggiore, Bologna; Basilica of Our Lady Help of Christians, Turin; Anagni Cathedral; Verona Cathedral; Foligno Cathedral; San Cesario di Lecce; Cesa; San Cesareo; San Cesario sul Panaro; Asola, Lombardy; Guardea; Cava de' Tirreni; Nave, Lombardy; Fara in Sabina.

== Icon of St. Caesarius around the world ==
On the occasion of the Extraordinary Jubilee of Mercy, a new icon of Saint Caesarius martyr painted by artist Giovanni Guida was exhibited in museums, cathedrals and basilicas alongside reliquaries in which are preserved fragments of the body of the saint. The tour included sites in Italy, Spain, Mexico, Portugal, France, Corsica, Germany, United States, England, Philippines, Croatia and Slovakia. The icon has been exhibited in such museums as the Kunstegewerbemuseum in Berlin; Museum Frederic Marès of Barcelona; Museum São Roque of Lisbon; Museum of the Chapter of the Rectory of Aschaffenburg) and in important basilicas (St. Joseph Cathedral in Buffalo; St. Raphael's Cathedral in Dubuque; Saint Anthony's Chapel in Pittsburgh; St. Martha Church in Morton Grove; St. Michael's Church in Netcong; Manila Cathedral; and Basilica Santa Croce in Gerusalemme in Rome).

== Illustrations life of Caesarius deacon and martyr ==
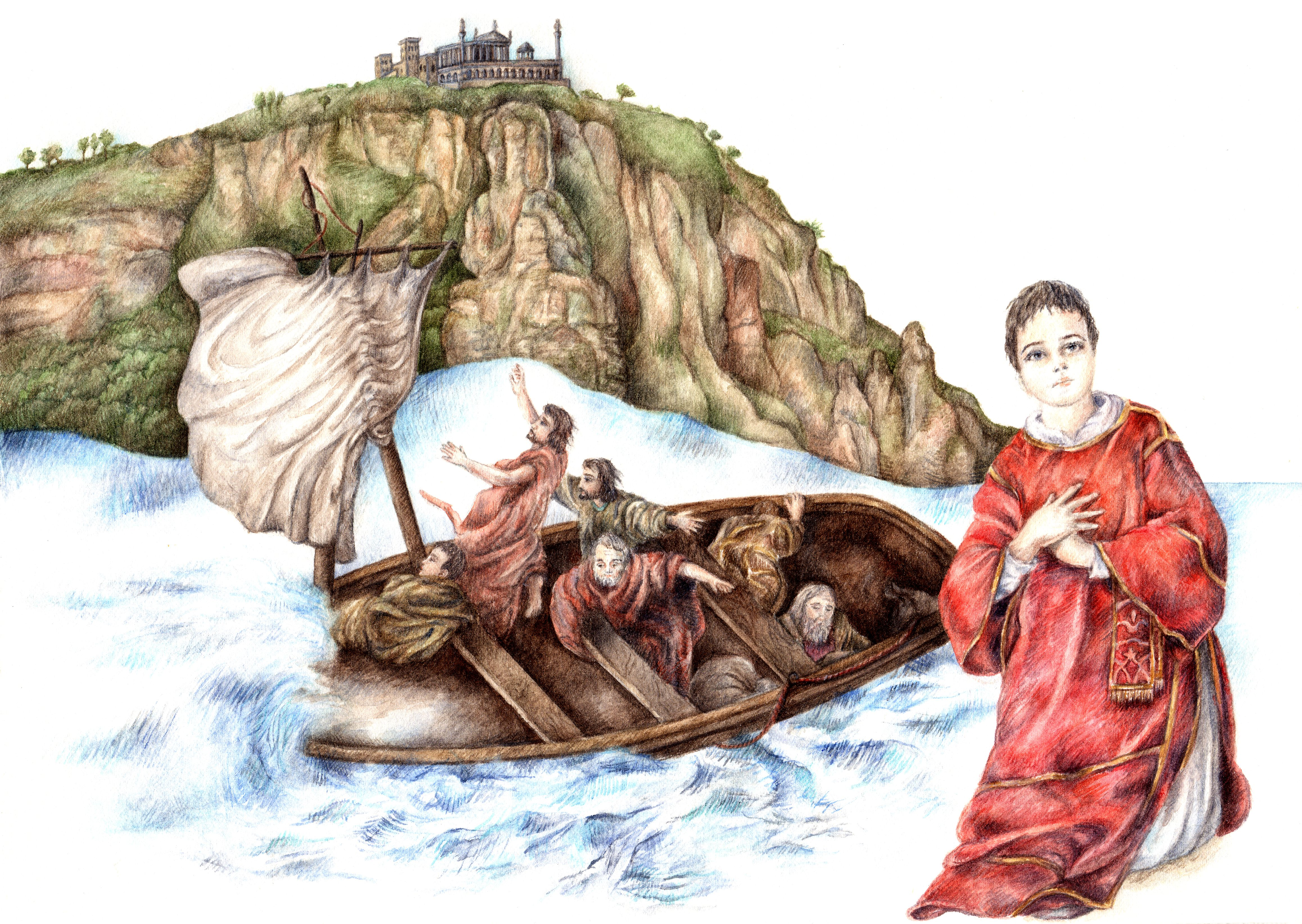
Shipwreck of Saint Caesarius deacon in the city of Terracina.

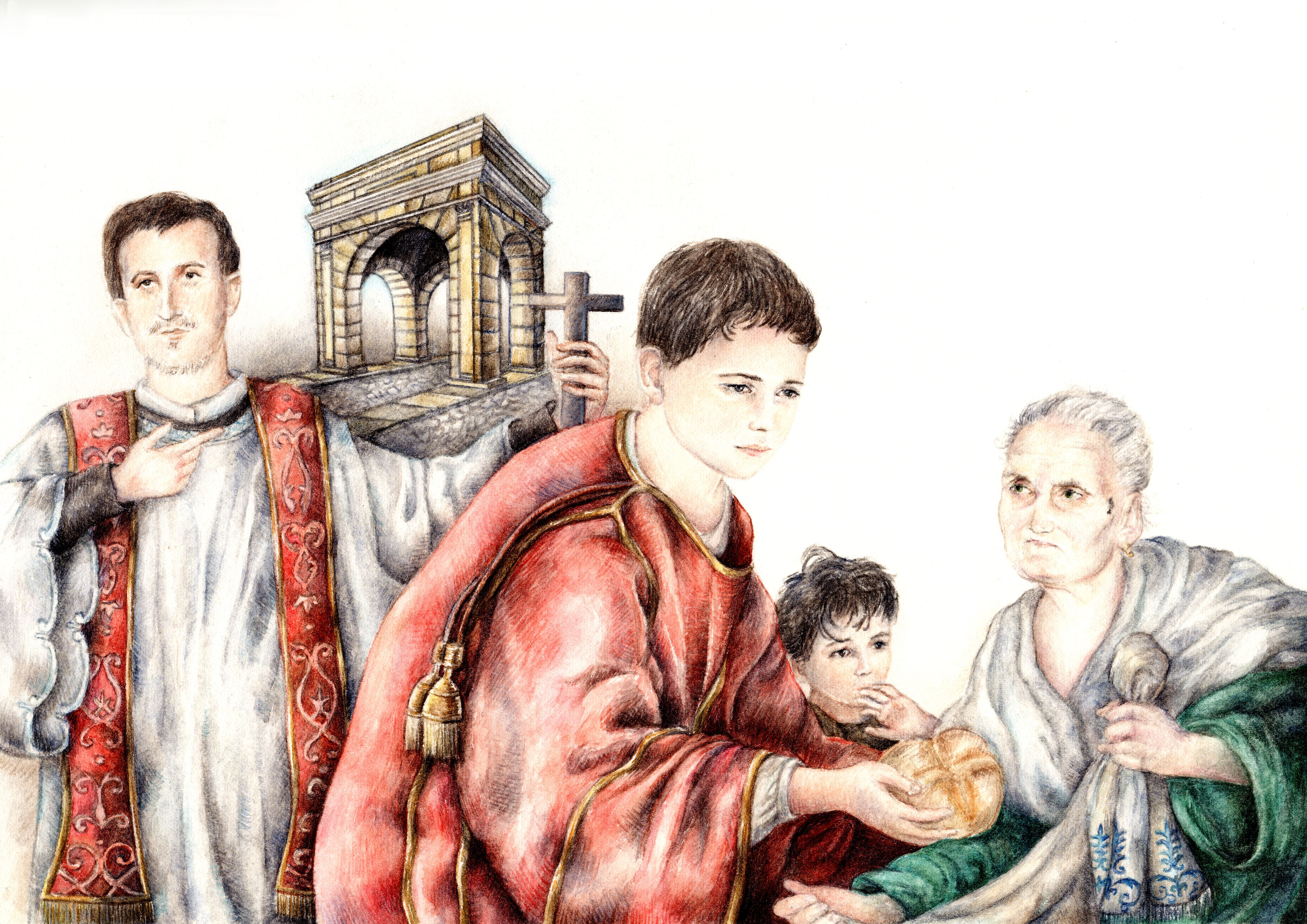
Preaching of Saints Caesarius deacon and Julian presbyter in Terracina.

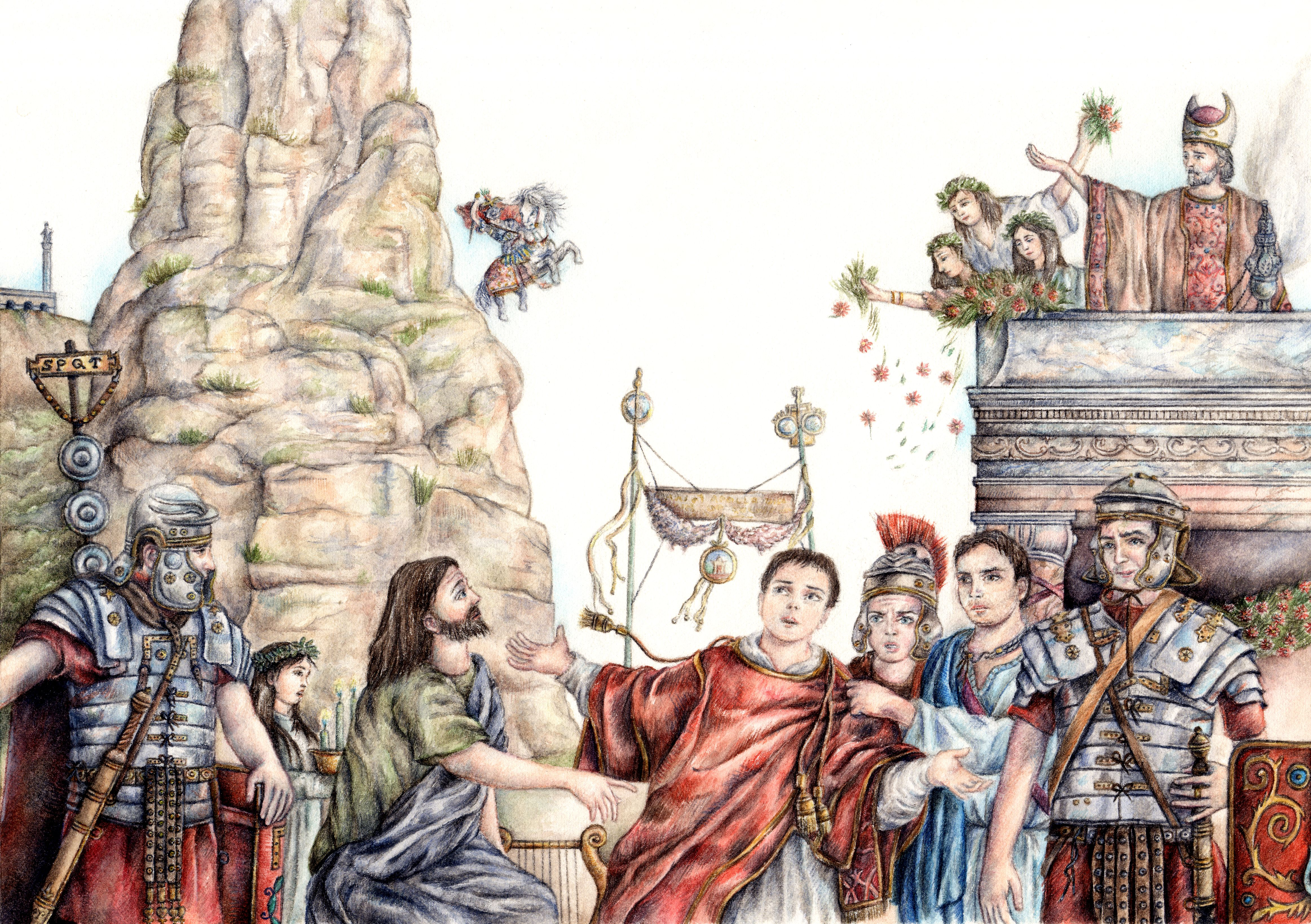
Saint Caesarius deacon denounces human sacrifice in Terracina.

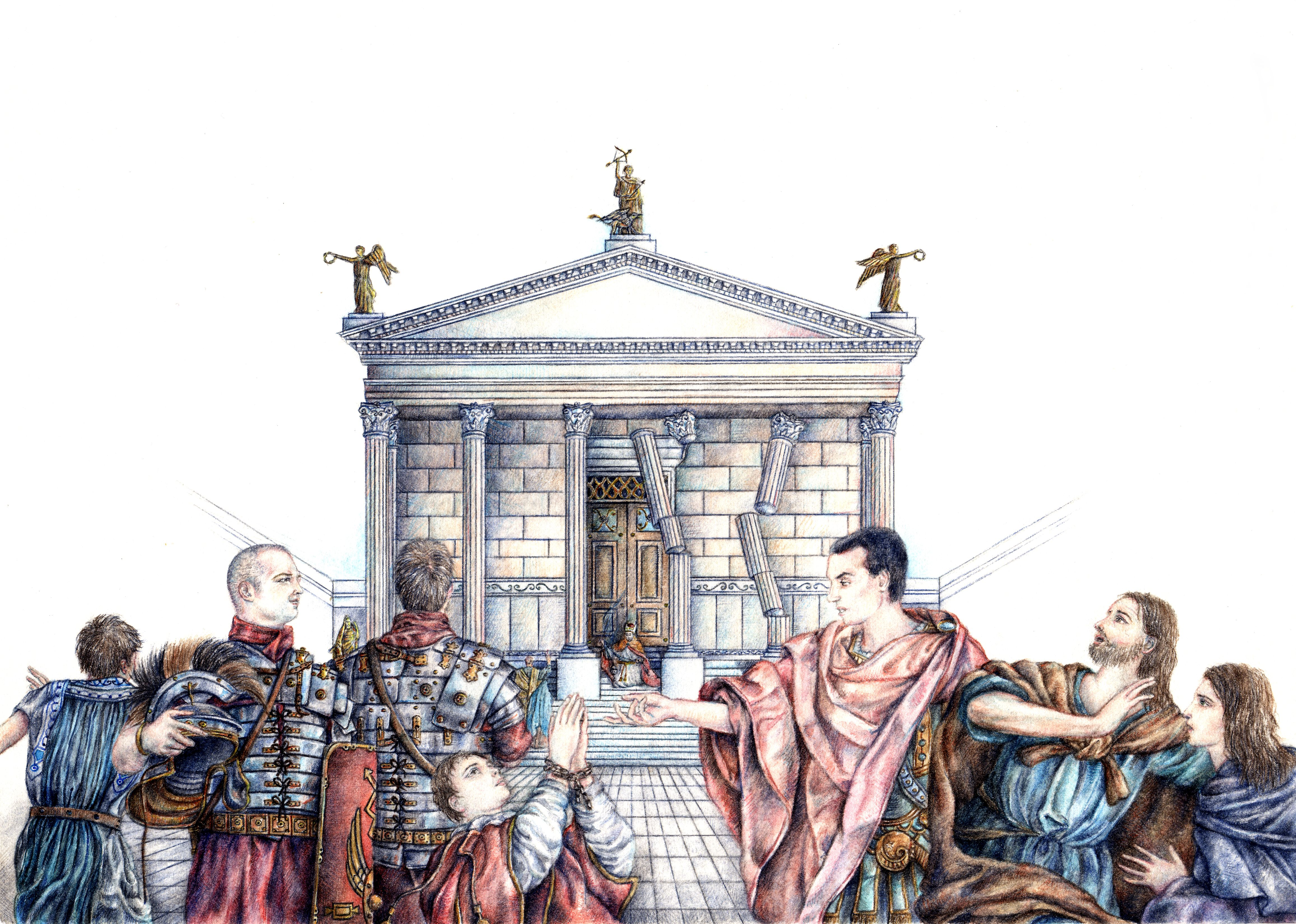
Saint Caesarius deacon destroys the Temple of Apollo in Terracina.

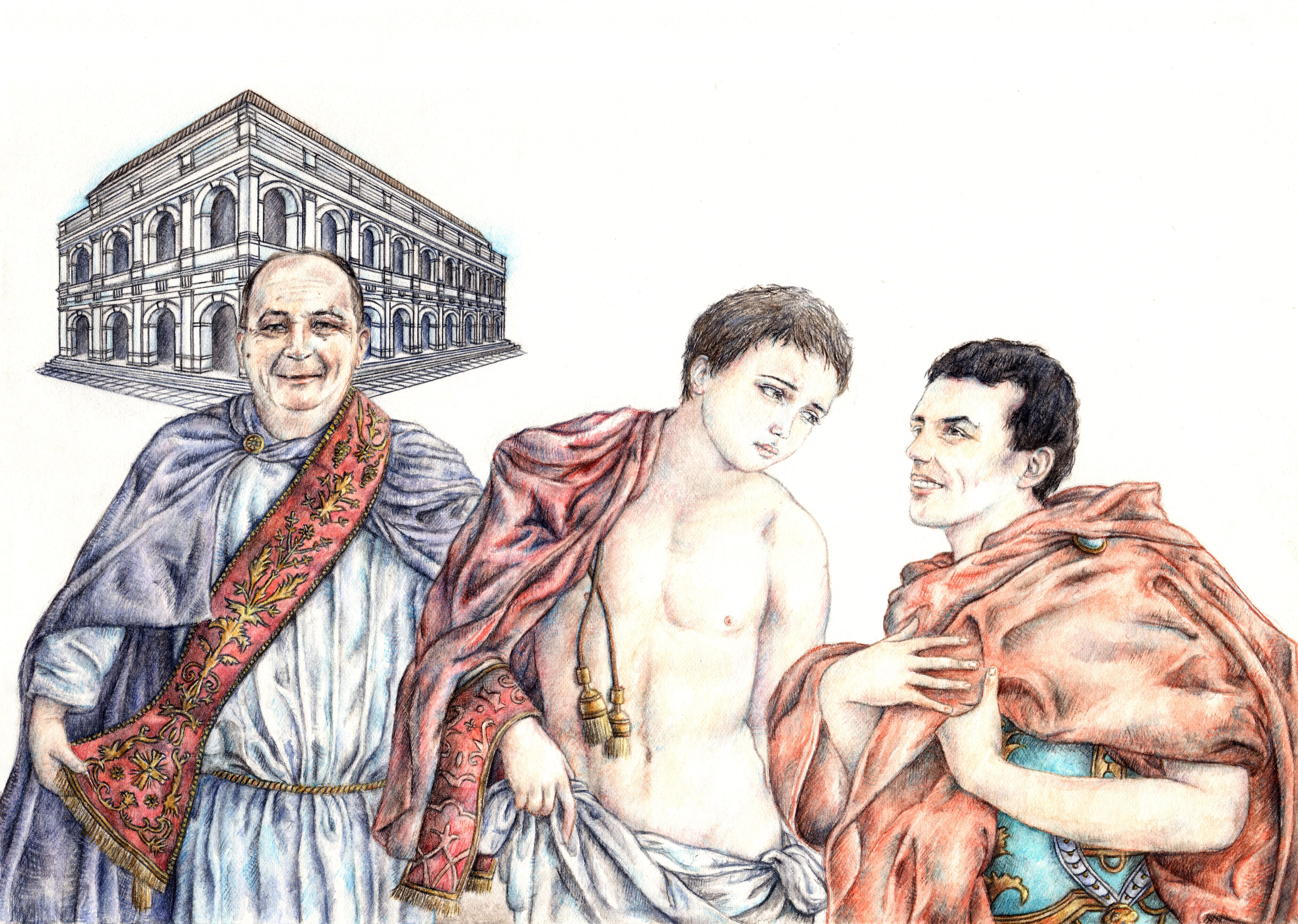
Saint Caesarius deacon converts the Roman consul Leonzio.

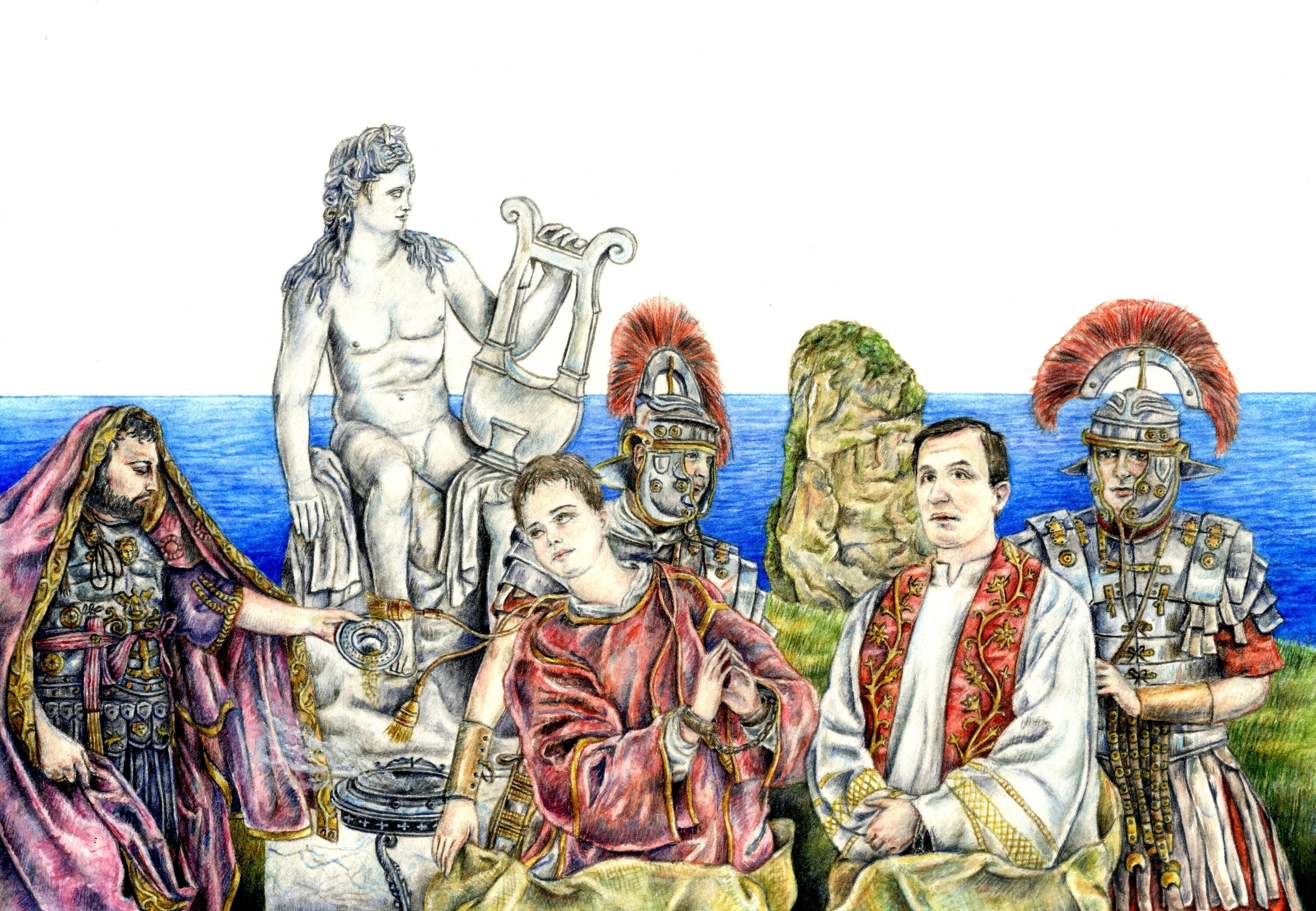
Martyrdom of Saints Caesarius deacon and Julian on "Pisco Montano" of Terracina: closed in a sack and thrown into the sea ("Poena cullei").

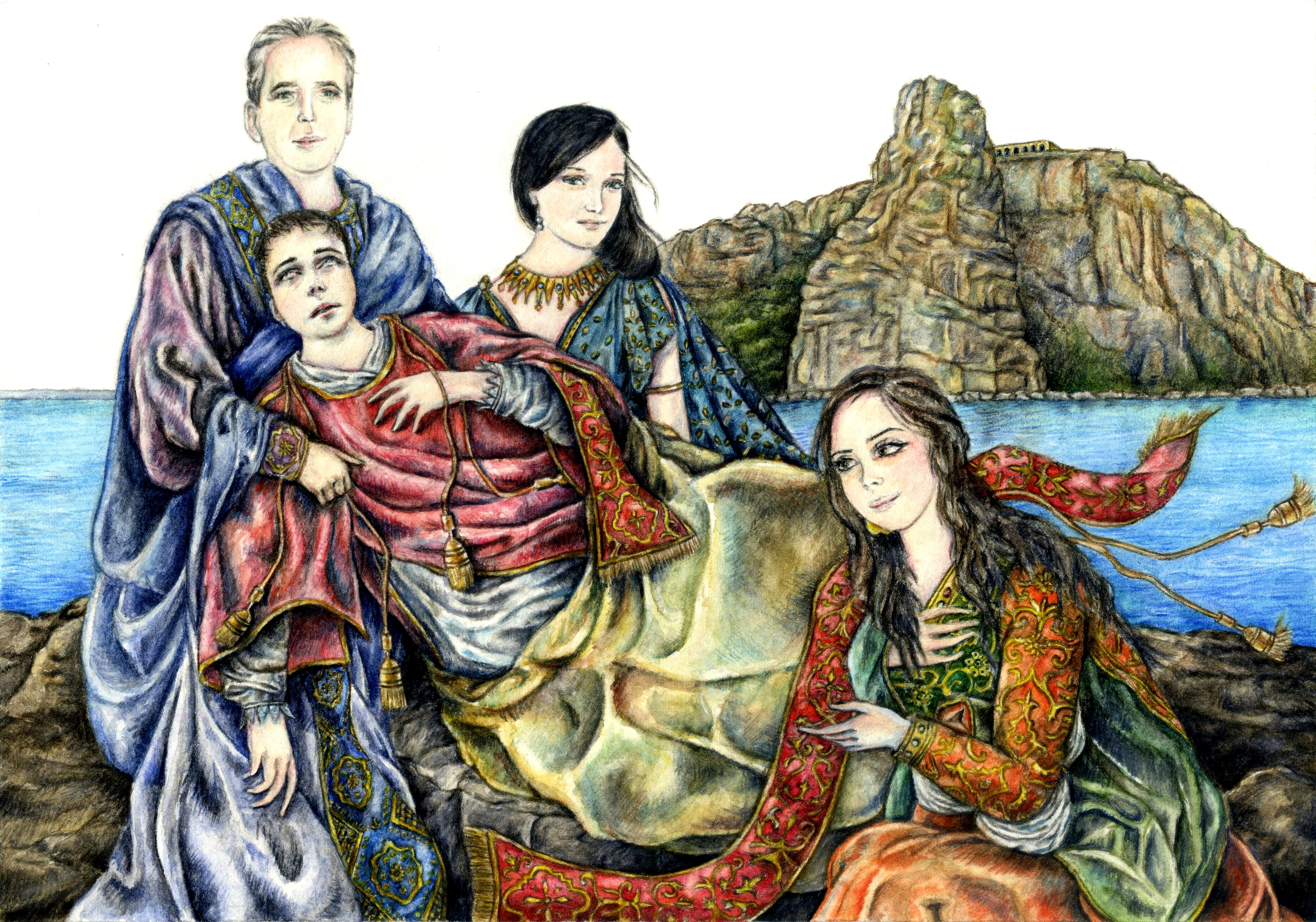
Finding of body of Saint Caesarius deacon in Terracina.

== Gallery ==
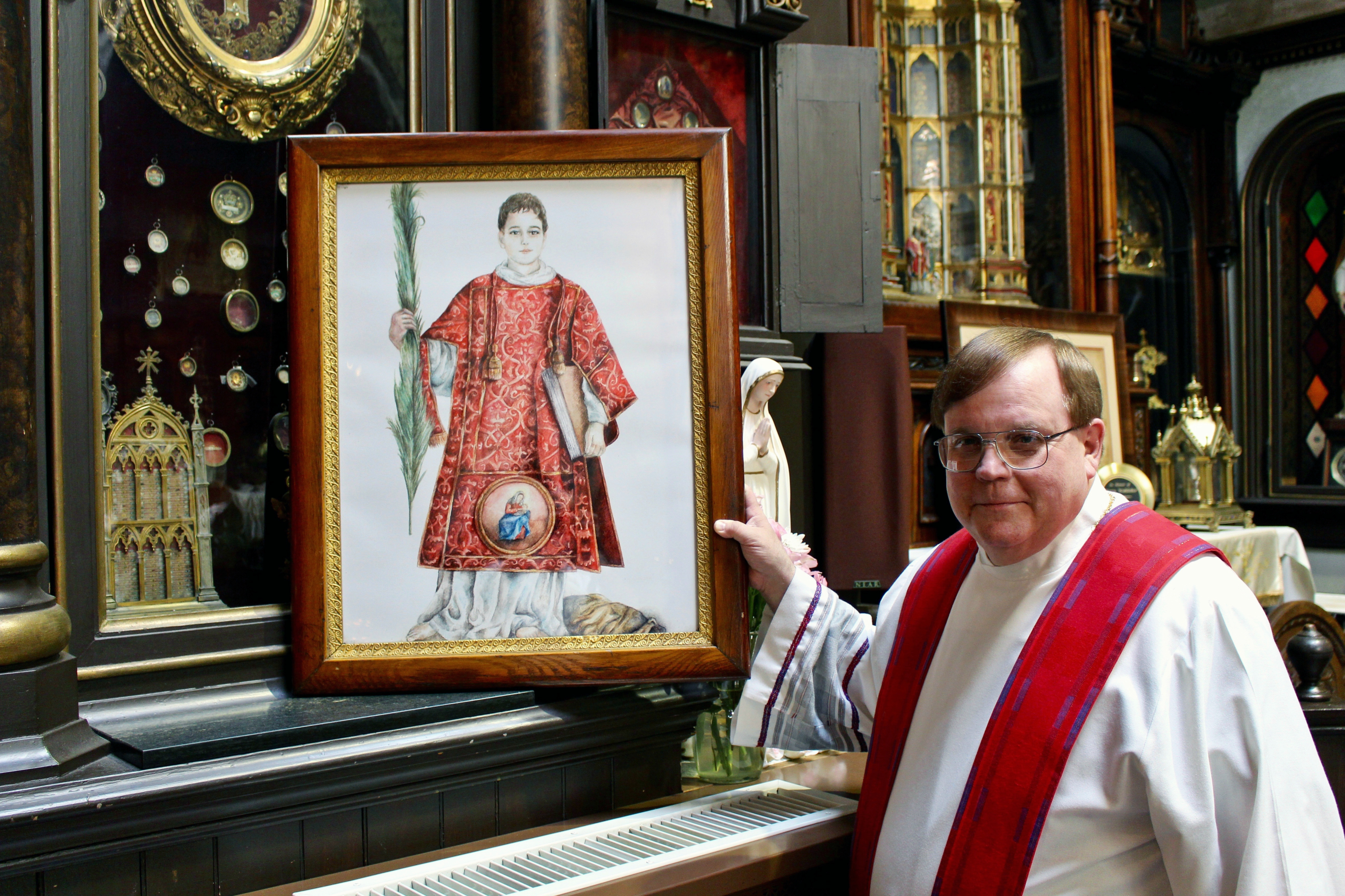
Relic of St. Caesarius deacon and martyr, Saint Anthony's Chapel in Pittsburgh, Pennsylvania. In photo, Fr. James Orr

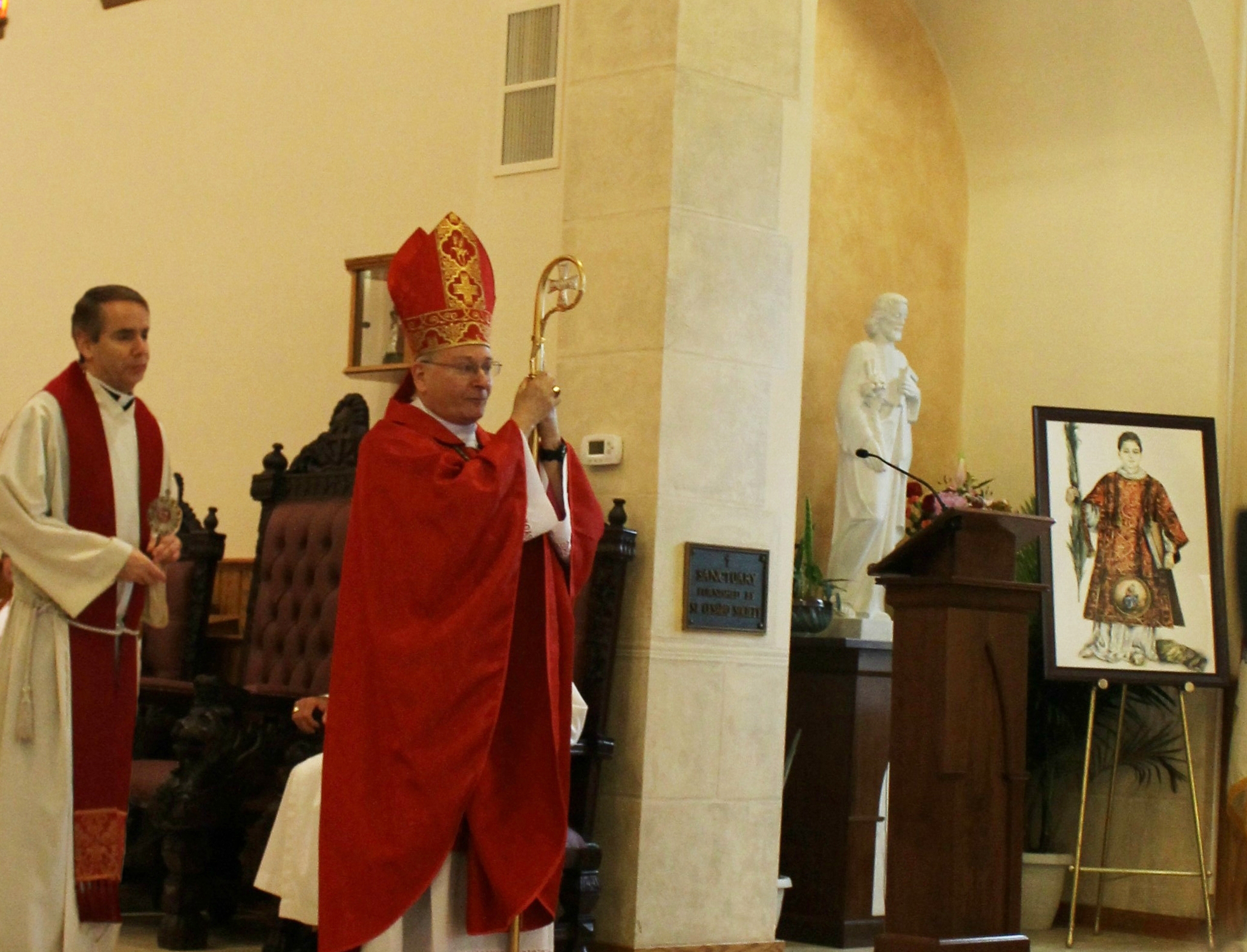
Relic of St. Caesarius deacon and martyr, St. Michael's Church in Netcong, New Jersey. In photo, Bishop Arthur J. Serratelli

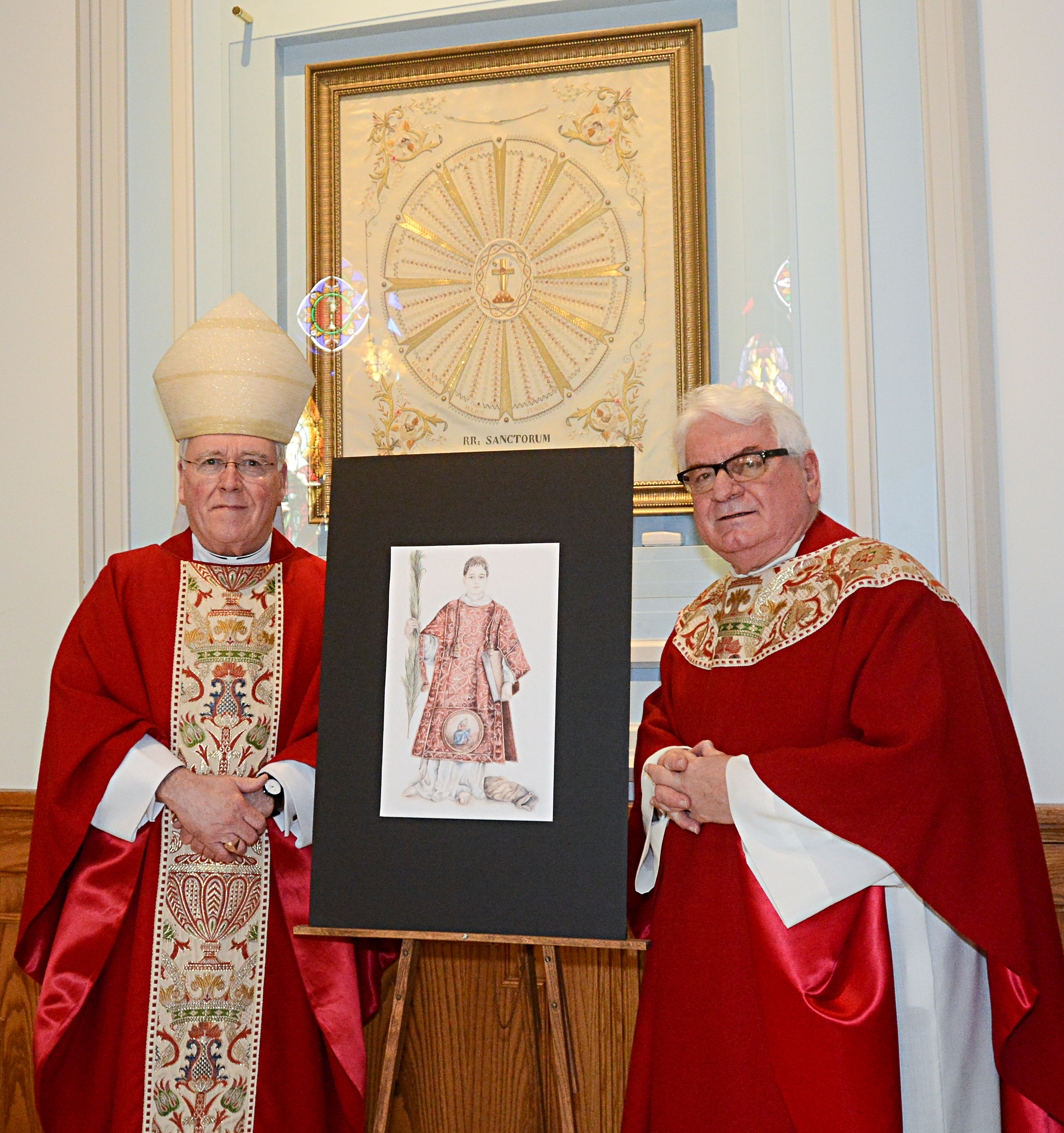
Bishop Richard J. Malone and Vic. Gen. Msgr. David S. Slubecky with the relics and the icon of Caesarius of Terracina, Cathedral of Buffalo (New York)

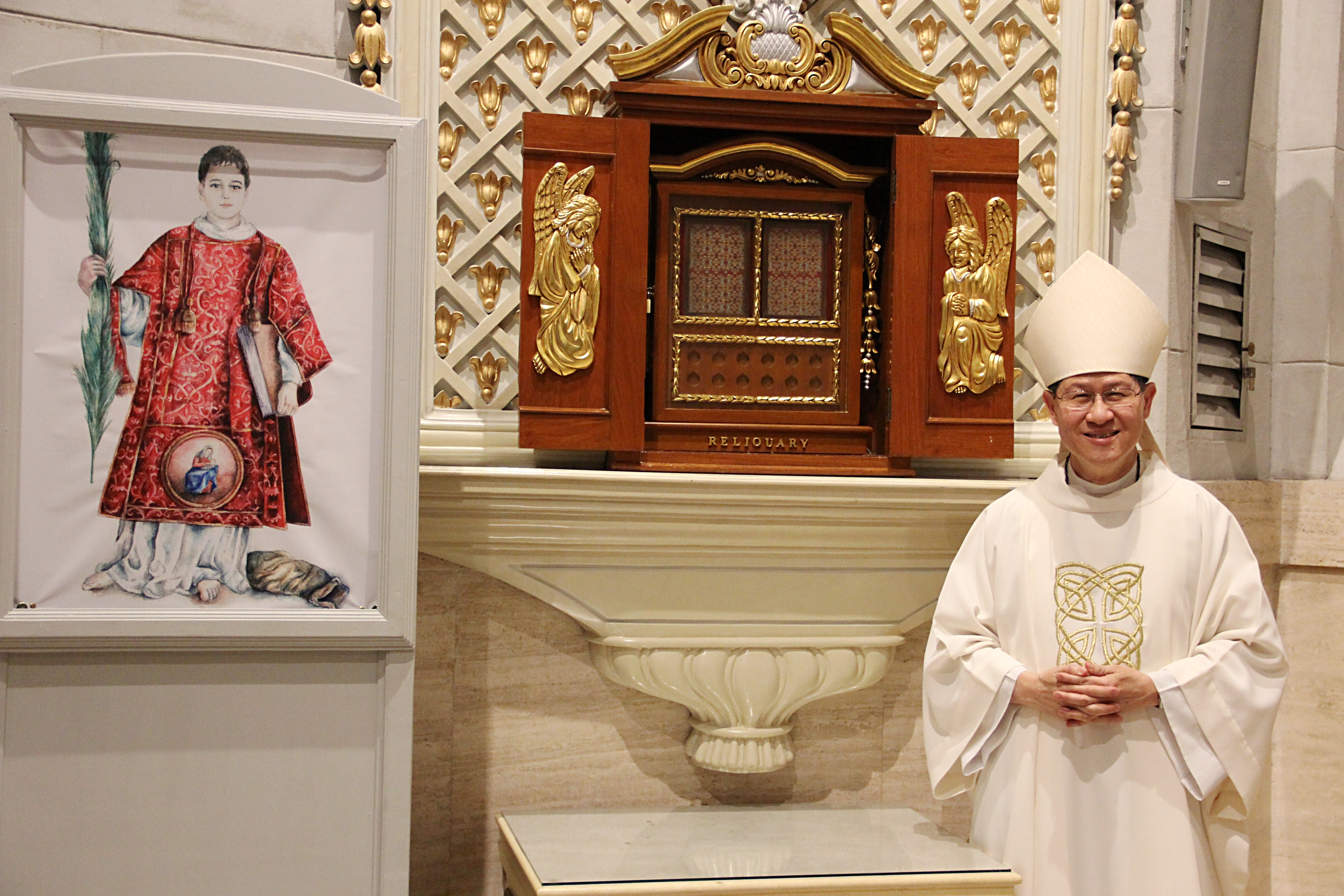
Relic of St. Caesarius deacon and marty, Manila Cathedral (Philippines). In photo, cardinal Luis Antonio Tagle

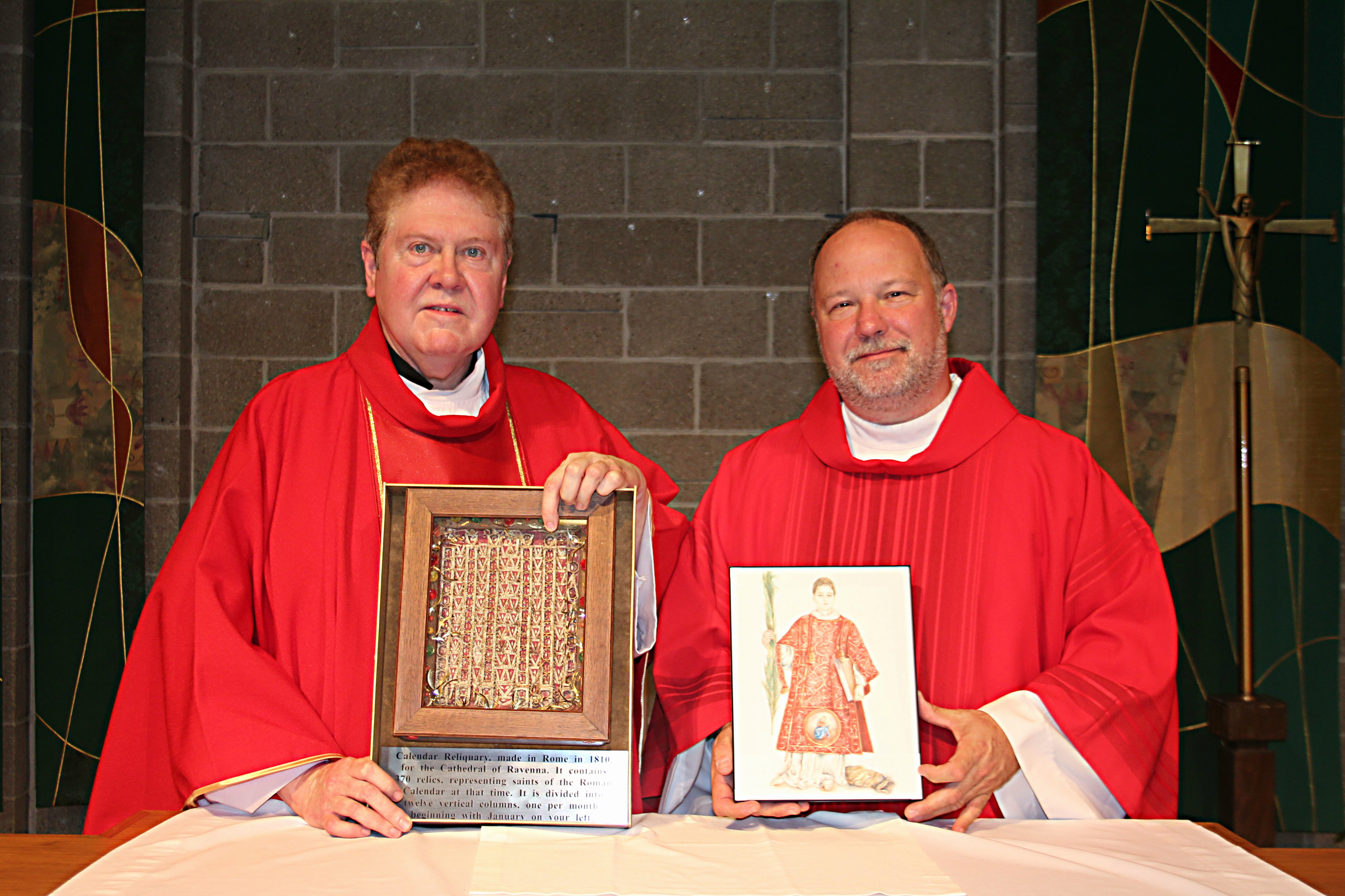
Relic of St. Caesarius deacon and martyr, St. Martha Church in Morton Grove (Illinois). In photo Father Dennis O'Neill and deacon John Herbert

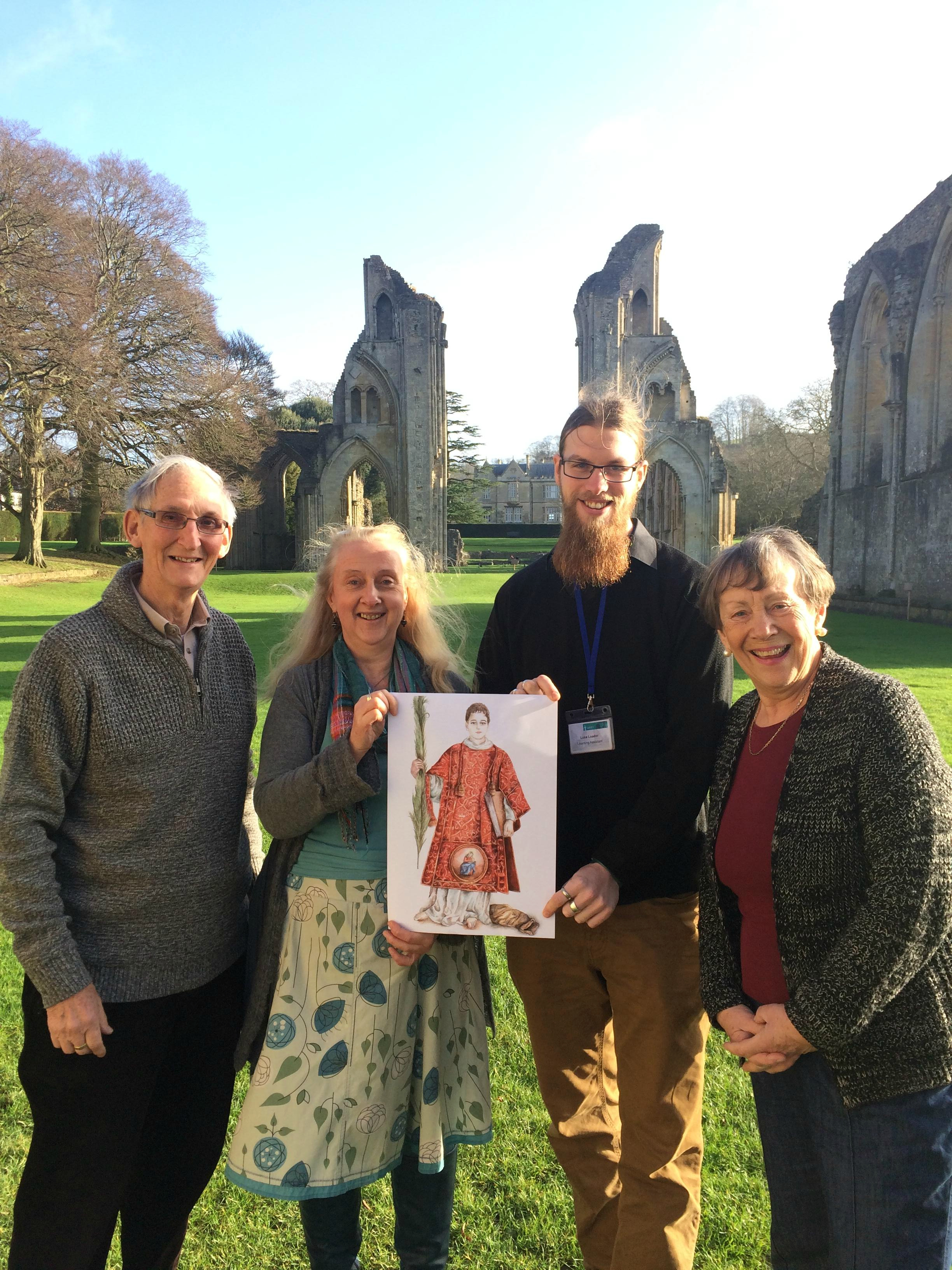
Saint Caesarius in Glastonbury Abbey

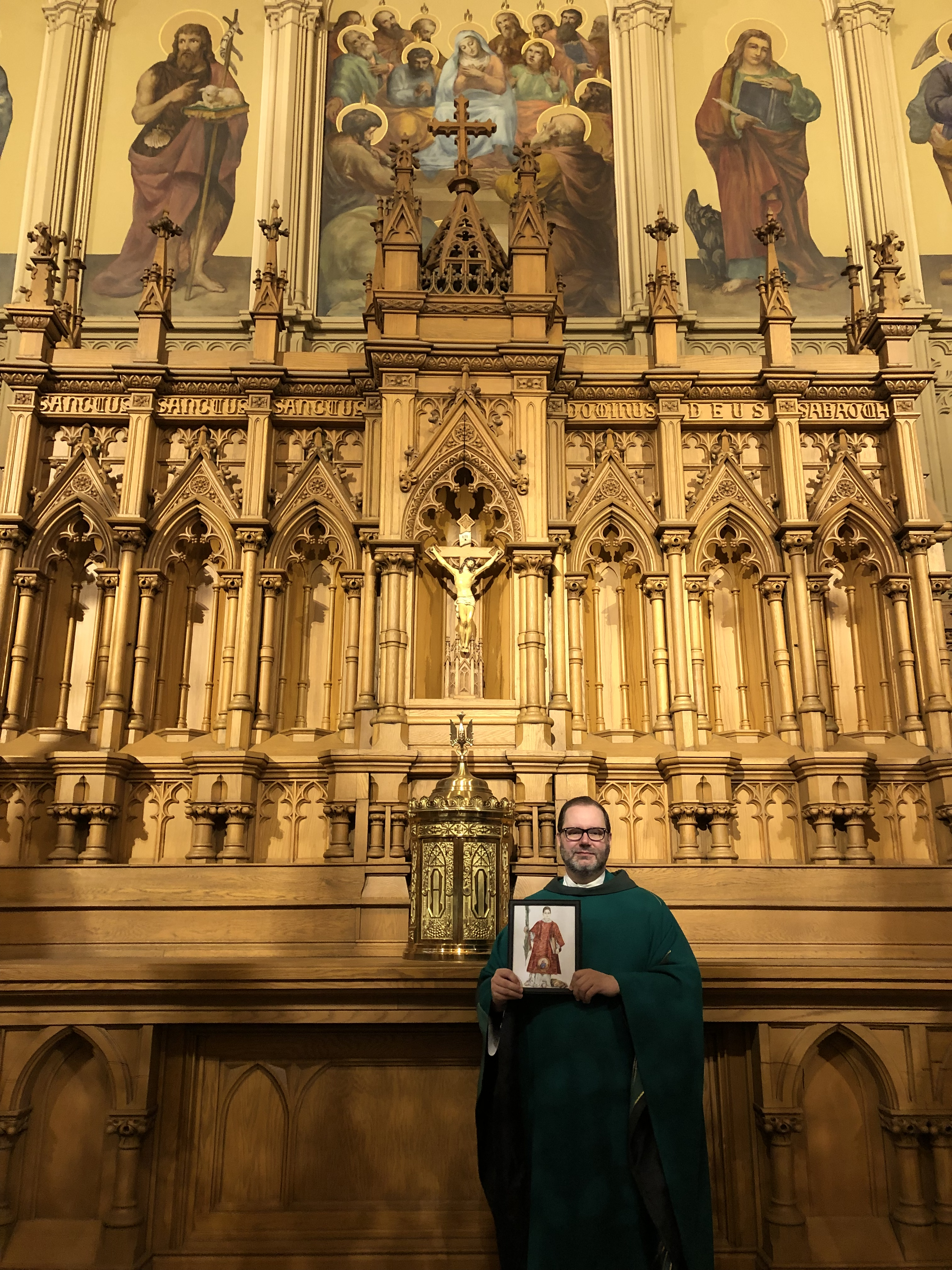
Relic of St. Caesarius deacon and martyr, Cathedral of St. Raphael and St. Patrick Church, Dubuque (Iowa)

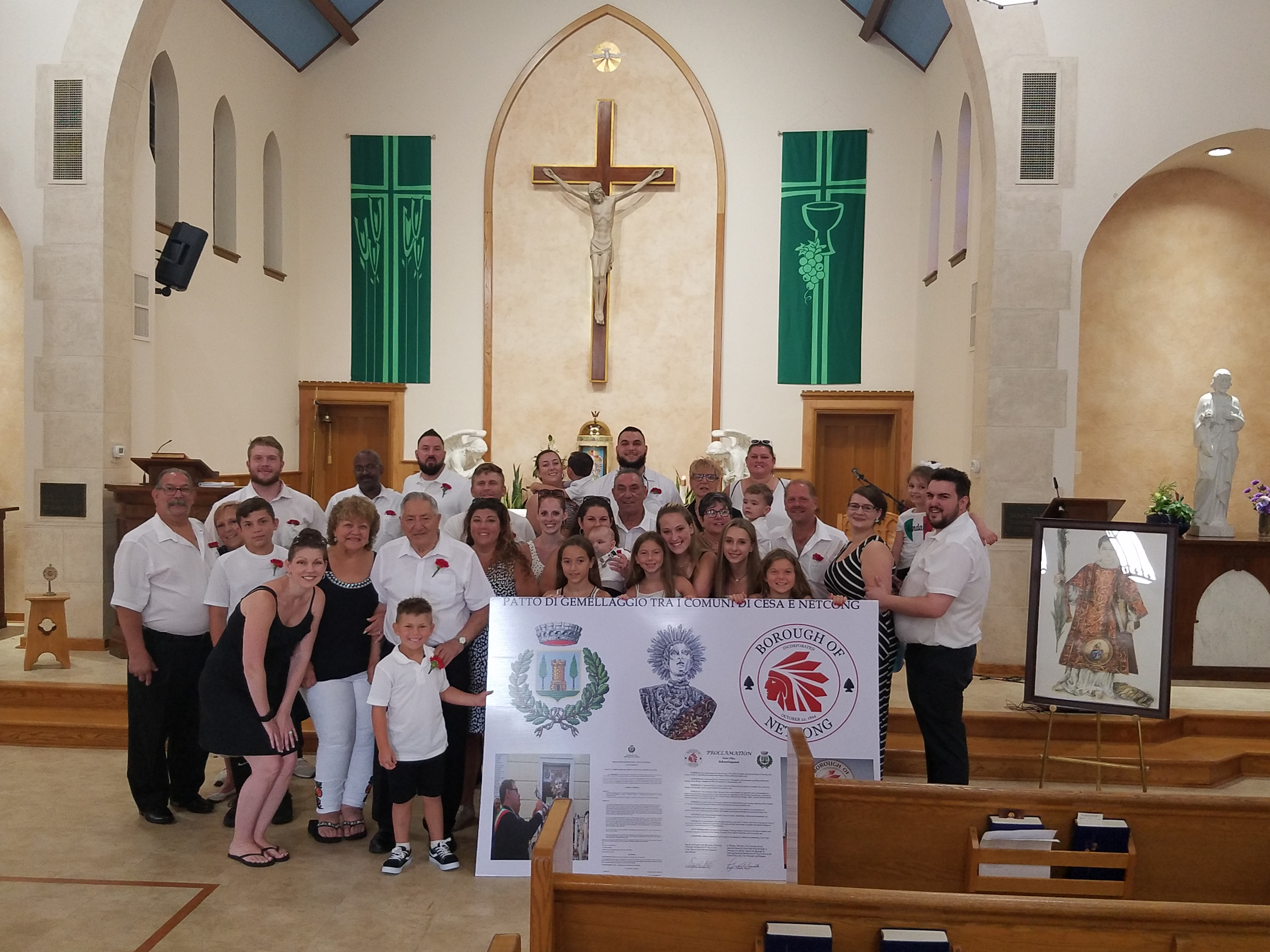
Netcong, St. Michael's Church, Pact of Sister Cities between Cesa in honor of St. Cesario martyr, July 20, 2019
