= Odon de Châtillon =

French cardinal

Orders
- Created cardinal: ca. 1095 by Pope Urban II

Personal details
- Occupation: Cardinal

Odon de Châtillon (died c. 1102) was a French cardinal. He was probably a nephew of Pope Urban II (1088–99).

== Career ==
He entered the Order of Benedictines in the monastery of Cluny. His uncle Urban II elevated him to the cardinalate and named him Cardinal-Bishop of Ostia ca. 1095. He participated in the papal election, 1099 and was a principal consecrator of Pope Paschal II. He attended the council of Melfi in October 1100.

Date of his death is not recorded. He subscribed the papal bull for the last time on 21 March 1102. His successor in the see of Ostia (Leo of Ostia) appears for the first time on 7 September 1109 but is believed to have been created before 1107.

== Bibliography ==
- Hans-Walter Klewitz, Reformpapsttum und Kardinalkolleg, Darmstadt 1957, p. 115 no. 4
- Rudolf Hüls, Kardinäle, Klerus und Kirchen Roms: 1049-1130, Tübingen 1977, p. 103-104 no. 7
- Miranda, Salvador. "CHÂTILLON, O.S.B.Clun., Odon de (?-1101)". The Cardinals of the Holy Roman Church. Florida International University Libraries. OCLC 53276621.
