= Terracina Cathedral =

Cathedral in Terracina, Italy

Coordinates: 41°17′31″N 13°14′54″E

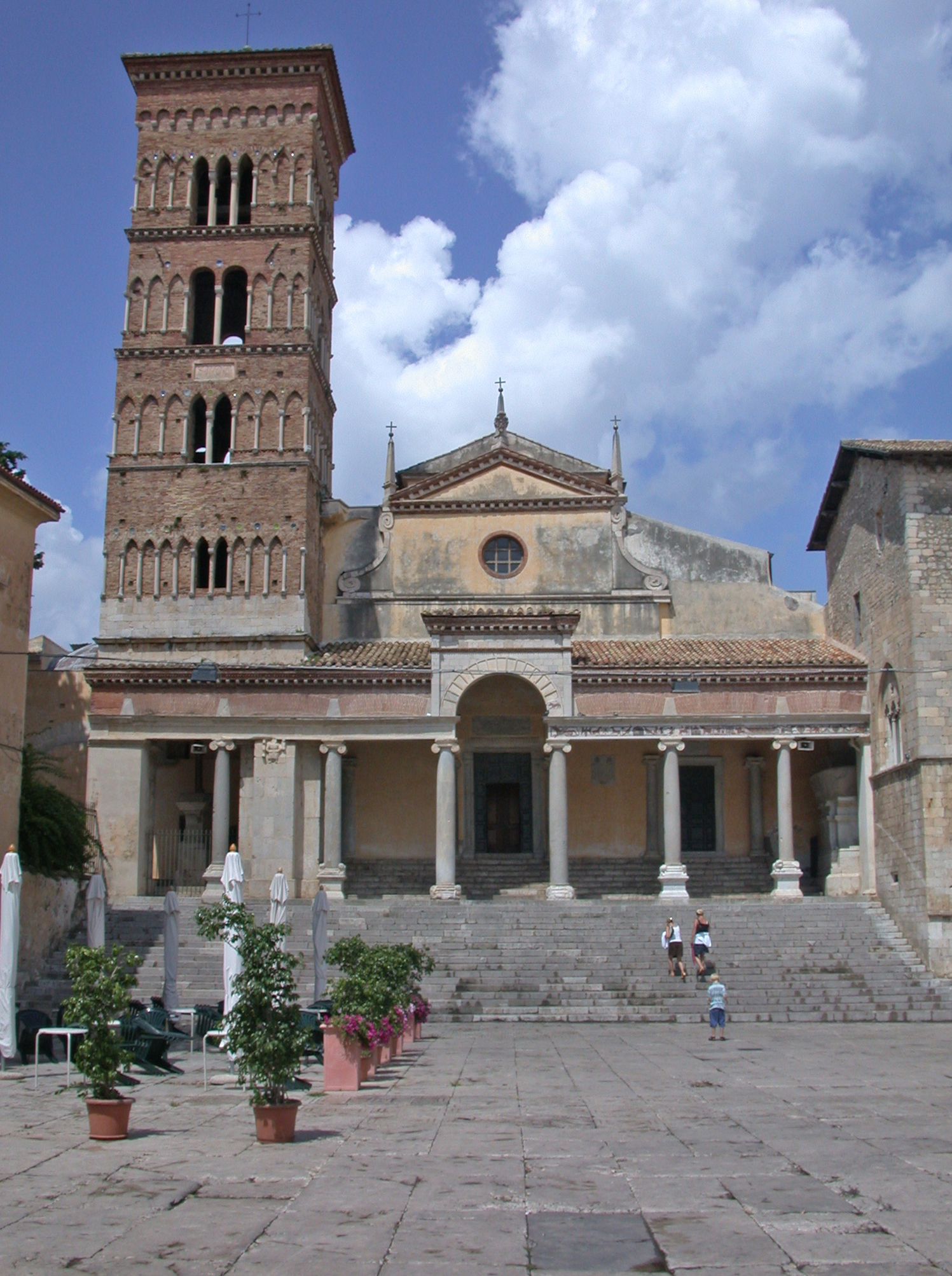
West front

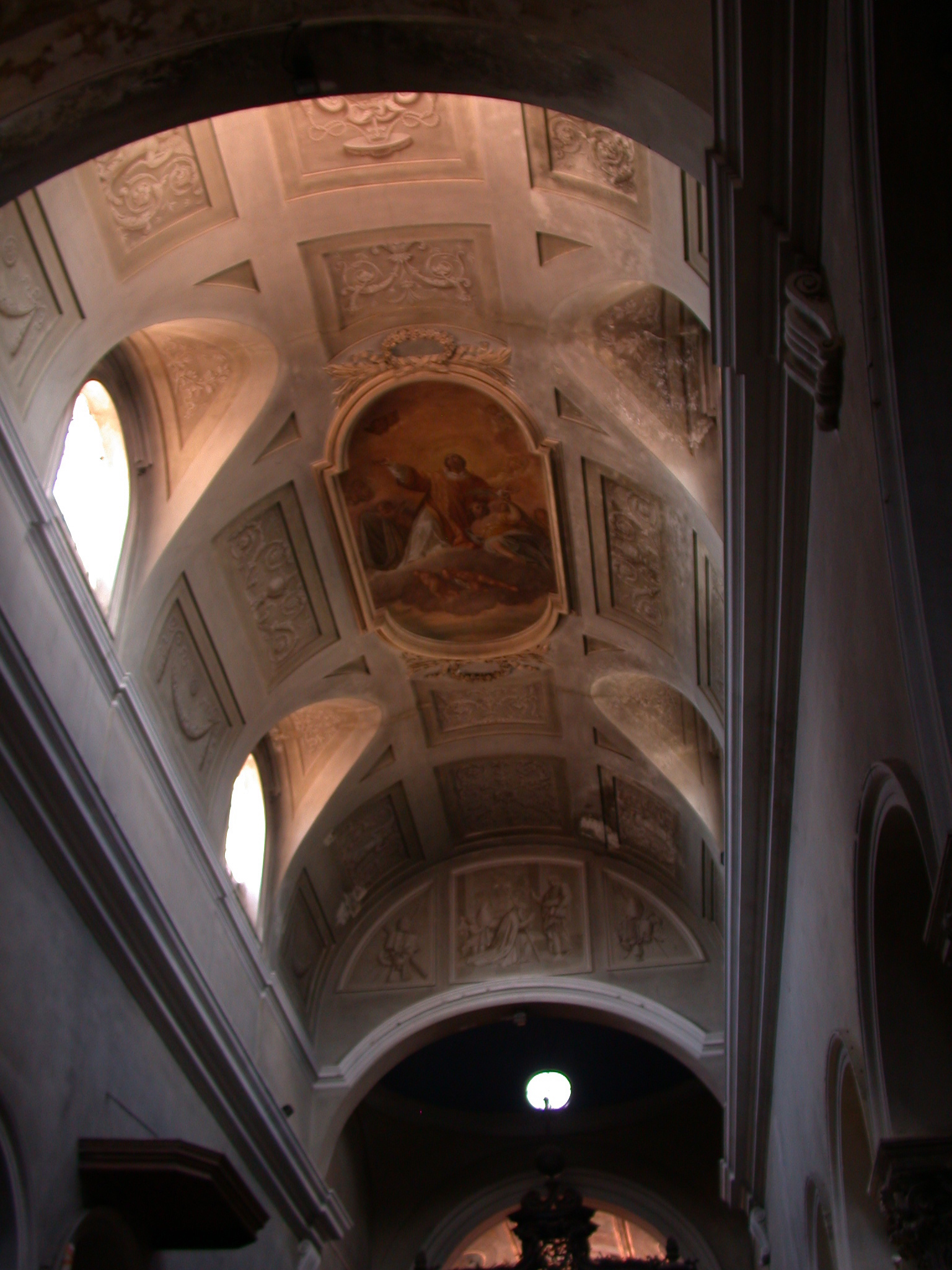
Vault

Terracina Cathedral (Italian: Duomo di Terracina; Concattedrale di San Cesareo or dei Santi Cesareo e Pietro) is a Roman Catholic cathedral in Terracina, Italy, dedicated to Saint Caesarius of Terracina and formerly to Saint Peter. Formerly the episcopal seat of the diocese of Terracina, it is now a co-cathedral in the diocese of Latina-Terracina-Sezze-Priverno.

== History ==
The cathedral was built in the 5th-6th centuries using the remains of a Roman temple with five naves in the city forum. The building underwent many alterations and restorations, among them those of the 11th century (reflecting its change of dedication from Saint Peter to the city's patron saint Caesarius of Terracina in 1074), of the 13th century and above all the extreme restoration in the Baroque style of the 18th century, which reduced the church from five naves to three with the construction of side chapels and the covering over of the Romanesque A-framed ceiling with barrel vaulting.

The cathedral was the site of the Papal conclave of 1088 which elected Pope Urban II.

As of 2015, the cathedral is undergoing another restoration.

== Description ==
The portico, which stands at the top of a flight of 30 steps on the podium of the Roman temple, is of artistic interest. It contains six reused Classical columns with a triumphal arch in the centre, surmounted by an ancient entablature with mosaic decorations including the figures of a winged monster, an eagle, palms, deer, birds, bulls and other things. Beneath the portico are a funerary basin of the Roman age and pairs of beasts crouching to either side of the bases of the columns. A further 7 steps lead to the two entrances to the cathedral, of which the principal one is decorated with marble friezes of the Augustan period.

To the north of the portico is the Romanesque campanile, curiously raised above ground level on four pilasters.

The interior has three naves separated by reused Roman columns, with side chapels. The two side naves terminate in apses, while the central one (which also has an apse, dating from 1729), terminates in a quadrangular space occupied by the choir. The presbytery and the choir are about a metre higher than the three naves.

The following features are of particular artistic interest:

- the Cosmatesque pavement of the central nave (12th-13th centuries)
- the medieval pulpit (first half of the 13th century), supported by five columns;
- the spiral column, used to hold the Easter candle, of the mediaeval period; a marble inscription gives the maker and the date of the column: Crudele, 31 October 1245;
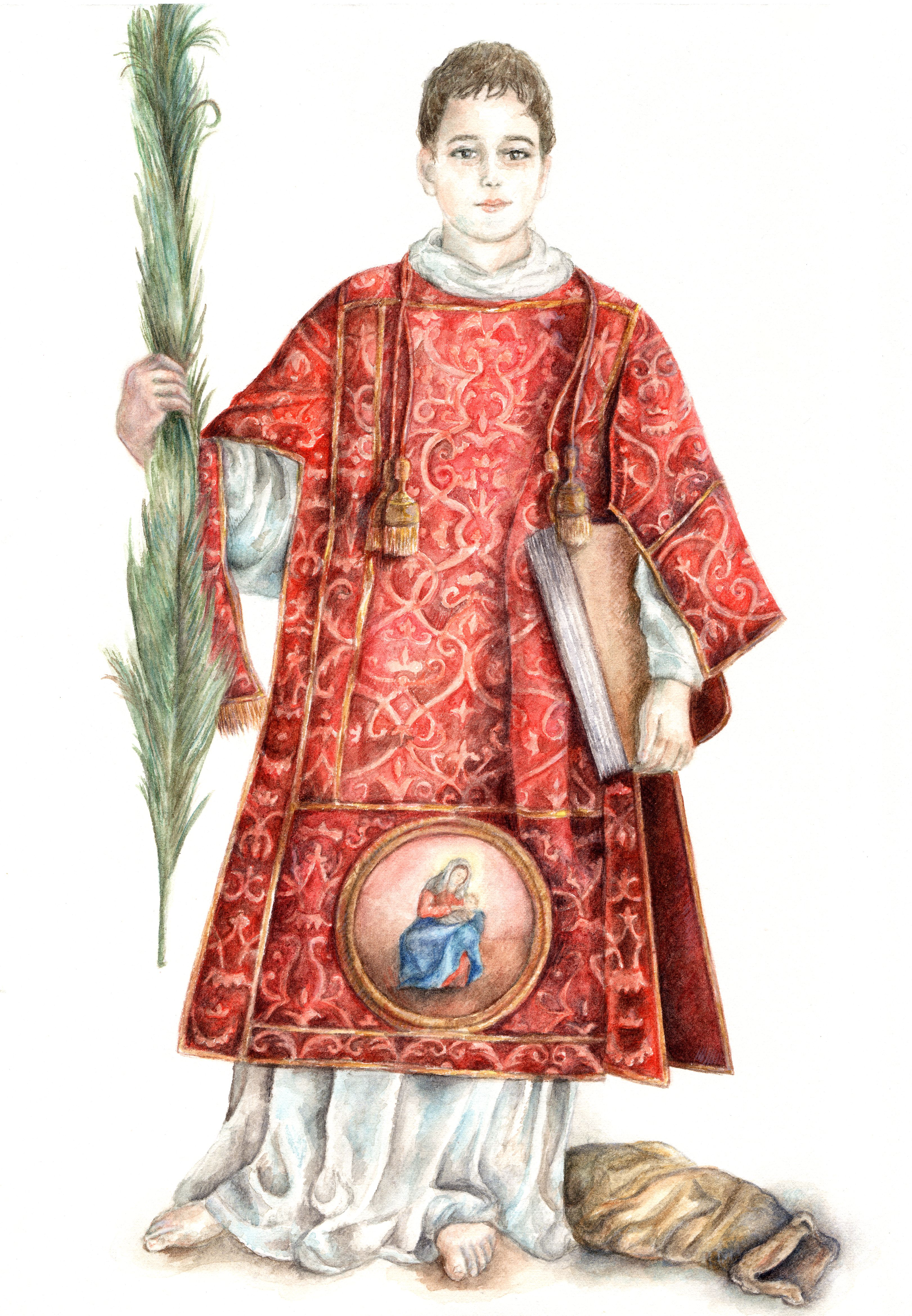
- Icon Saint Caesarius deacon and martyr, patron of Terracina
  the 18th-century frescoes of the presbytery and choir, depicting episodes from the election of Pope Urban II.

== Bibliography ==
- Christof Henning, 2006: Latium. Das Land um Rom. Mit Spaziergängen in der Ewigen Stadt. (3rd revised edition). DuMont: Köln ISBN 3-7701-6031-2 (Dumont-Kunst-Reiseführer).
- Anton Henze, 1994: Kunstführer Rom und Latium. Philipp Reclam GmbH: Stuttgart ISBN 3-15-010402-5.
