= 1099 papal election =

Election of Catholic Pope Paschal II

Papal election August 1099

Dates and location
- 13 August 1099; Basilica di San Clemente, Rome

Elected pope
- Raniero di Bleda; Name taken: Paschal II
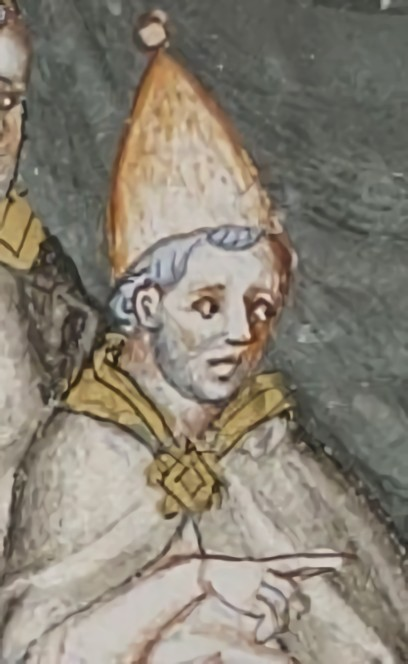

The 1099 papal election following the death of Pope Urban II took place on 13 August 1099. Before his death, Urban had designated Cardinal Raniero di Bleda as his successor. The cardinal-electors, with the consent of the lower Roman clergy, chose Raniero, who, after a flight and over his considerable objections, accepted and took the name Paschal II. He was consecrated a bishop and crowned pope on the next day.

== Death of Urban II ==
On 7 August 1098, the supporters of the antipope Clement III (Wibert of Ravenna) were still able to hold a synod in Santa Maria Rotunda.

On 24 August 1098, Petrus Leonis was able to seize the Castel Sant'Angelo and drive the last forces of Emperor Henry IV from Rome. Pope Urban was able to return to Rome in November 1098. He summoned a church council, which met in S. Peter's Basilica from 24–30 April 1099; it confirmed the acts of the councils of Melfi and Piacenza and settled on the route by which the crusade would attack Jerusalem. It was two weeks before the death of the pope, on 14 July 1099, that the soldiers of the First Crusade won Jerusalem, news of which arrived in Rome only after his death.

Before his death, Pope Urban had designated Cardinal Raniero da Bieda to be his successor

Urban II died in Rome on 29 July 1099, in the house of Petrus Leonis near the church of S. Niccolo in Carcere. The papal palace at the Lateran was in too dilapidated a state for residence.

During this time, the schism initiated by Antipope Clement III, with the support of the Empire and much of the Roman clergy, continued. Wibert finally died in September 1100 at Castello near Sutri, which he still held. His followers in Rome immediately met in S. Peter's and elected Theoderic (Tiedricus), the cardinal-bishop of S. Rufina (Albano?), as his successor.

== Electors ==
It is known that cardinal-priests and cardinal-deacons participated.

=== Bishops ===
The election was attended by five of the six cardinal-bishops and one bishop, who acted as a substitute for the Cardinal-bishop of Sabina. This office was vacant from 1094 years, and the territory of the Diocese of Sabina supporters controlled the antipope Clement III.

- Gualterius (cardinal-bishop from c. 1091) - Bishop of Albano
- Odon de Chatillon (c. 1095) - Bishop of Ostia
- Milo (after 1096) - Bishop of Palestrina
- Mauricius (c. 1097) - Bishop of Porto
- Bovo (1099) - Bishop of Tusculum
- Offo - Bishop of Nepi

=== Other cardinals ===
In August 1099, in obedience Urban II was only ten cardinal-priests and three cardinal-deacons, but probably no more than seven cardinal-priests and three cardinal-deacons were eligible to participate in the election:

- Raniero (c. 1078) - Cardinal-priest of basilica of San Clemente, abbot of the basilica of Saint Lawrence outside the Walls
- Benedict (c. 1080) - Cardinal-priest of Santa Pudenziana
- Alberto (c. 1091) - Cardinal-priest of Santa Sabina
- Teuzo (1090) - Cardinal-priest of Santi Giovanni e Paolo
- Giovanni da Piacenza (1096) - Cardinal-priest (Note: Titular church unknown)
- Benedict (1098 ?) - Cardinal-priest of Santi Silvestro e Martino ai Monti
- Petrus (1098) - Cardinal-priest of San Sisto
- Jean de Bourgogne (1098) - Cardinal-priest of Sant'Anastasia
- Giovanni Gaetani (1088) - Cardinal-deacon of Santa Maria in Cosmedin, Chancellor of the Holy Roman Church
- Docibilis (1099) - Cardinal-deacon
- Paganus (1099) - Cardinal-deacon of Santa Maria Nuova

The cardinal-deacons present were probably the Palatine deacons, assistants to the Pope whose Cathedra is located in the Archbasilica of St John Lateran, which numbered up to six deacons. The twelve regional deacons joined the rank of cardinals only under Paschal II.

=== Absent ===
- Bruno (1079) - Bishop of Segni
- Richard de Saint-Victor (1078) - Cardinal-priest and Abbot of Saint-Victor, Marseille and of the Basilica of Saint Paul Outside the Walls; papal legate in southern France and Spain.
- Oderisio de Marsi (Cardinal-deacon 1059, Cardinal-priest 1088) - Cardinal-priest (Note: Titular church unknown, believed to be Santa Cecilia) and abbot of Monte Cassino
- Bernard degli Uberti, (1099) - Cardinal-Priest of San Crisogono, abbot of Vallombrosa Abbey, Superior General of the Vallumbrosan Order

== Election of Paschal II ==
Following the funeral of Pope Urban, the faithful of Rome (ecclesia quae erat in Urbe) cried out for a pastor to be given them. Therefore, the cardinals and bishops, the deacons and leaders of the City (primores Urbis), the primiscrinii, and the scribes of the regions assembled at the church of S. Clemente, the titulus of Cardinal Raniero. While the discussion turned on many matters, in due course it began to center on Raniero himself, who, after all, had been designated by Urban II. When he realized what was happening, he was displeased and wished to avoid being chosen. He, therefore, fled and hid. This may explain in part the two-week period between the death of Pope Urban and the choice of his successor.

He was found and brought to a meeting, where he told the Patres that he was unequal to the weight of the burden, to which he would succumb. He was told in reply that divine inspiration would supply him the necessary wisdom; the people of Rome were calling for a pastor, the clergy was electing him, the Patres were praising him; God would provide. "We elect and confirm you in the office of supreme pontiff."

On 13 August 1099 the cardinals in the presence of the lower clergy and representatives of the city authorities unanimously elected Ranieirus, the cardinal-priest of San Clemente and abbot of the Basilica of Saint Lawrence outside the Walls, as successor to Urban II. He took the Papal name Paschal II. He was then acclaimed with the traditional formula by the primiscrinarii and regionary scribes, "Paschalem papam sanctus Petrus elegit". They then invested him with the red mantle and the papal tiara and conducted him in a joyful procession to the Lateran Basilica, where he was seated in the chair before the east portal. Various ceremonies of installation were performed, and he took possession of the papal palace.

On the next day, in S. Peter's Basilica, he was consecrated Bishop of Rome by Eudes of Chatillon, Bishop of Ostia, who was assisted by other Cardinal-bishops and Offo, bishop of Nepi. (Note: Watterich II, pp. 2-3: "Die altero, mensis sexti XIV, die primo consecrandus in pontificem consecraturi pontifices cum frequentia populi plebisque basilicam beati Petri adeunt. Quorum nomina sunt haec: Oddo Ostiensis, Mauricius Portuensis, Gualterius Albanensis, Bovo Lavicanus, Milo Praenestinus, Offo Nepsinus. Et inter missarum solempnia loco et termino quo decuit manum sibi imponunt, primus in consecratione Oddo Ostiensis, qui ad hoc utitur pallio, et benedixit et linivit eum chrismate catholice. Igitur a catholicis et orthodoxis episcopis in pontificem consecratus....")

== Sources ==
- Dopierała, Kazimierz The Book of the Popes (Księga papieży) (in Polish), Ed. Pallotinum, Poznan 1996, pp. 160
- Gregorovius, Ferdinand (1896). History of Rome in the Middle Ages. Volume IV, Part I. Volume IV, Part II. second edition, revised (London: George Bell, 1896).
- Holder, Karl (1892). Die Designation der Nachfolger durch die Päpste. (in German) Freiburg: Weith.
- Huls, Rudolf, Kardinal, Klerus und Kirchen Roms: 1049-1130 (in German). Tübingen 1977.
- Jaffé, Philipp, Regesta Pontificum Romanorum ab condita ecclesia ad annum p. Chr. n. 1198 (in Latin); 2nd ed. by S. Löwenfeld, F. Kaltenbrunner, P. Ewald Vol 1. Leipzig, 1888.
- Klewitz, Hans Walter, Reformpapsttum und Kardinalkolleg (in German). Darmstadt 1957.
- Loughlin, James F. (1911). Pope Paschal II, The Catholic Encyclopedia. Vol. 11. New York: Robert Appleton Company, 1911. (last accessed 18 November 2021).
- Miranda, Salvador. "Election of August 10 to 14, 1099 (Paschal II)". The Cardinals of the Holy Roman Church. Florida International University. OCLC 53276621.
- Robinson, I.S., The Papacy 1073-1198. Continuity and Innovations, Cambridge University Press 1990.
- Watterich, J. B. M. (1862). Pontificum Romanorum qui fuerunt inde ab exeunte saeculo IX usque ad finem saeculi XIII vitae: ab aequalibus conscriptae (in Latin). Vol. Tomus primus. Leipzig: G. Engelmann.
- Watterich, J. B. M. (1862). Pontificum Romanorum qui fuerunt inde ab exeunte saeculo IX usque ad finem saeculi XIII vitae: ab aequalibus conscriptae (in Latin). Vol. Tom. II. Leipzig: G. Engelmann.

=== External links ===
- John Paul Adams. "Sede Vacante 1099 (July 29—August 13, 1099)". California State University Northridge; retrieved: 20 November 2021.
