= Santa Brigida, Naples =

Church of Santa Brigida
- Chiesa di Santa Brigida
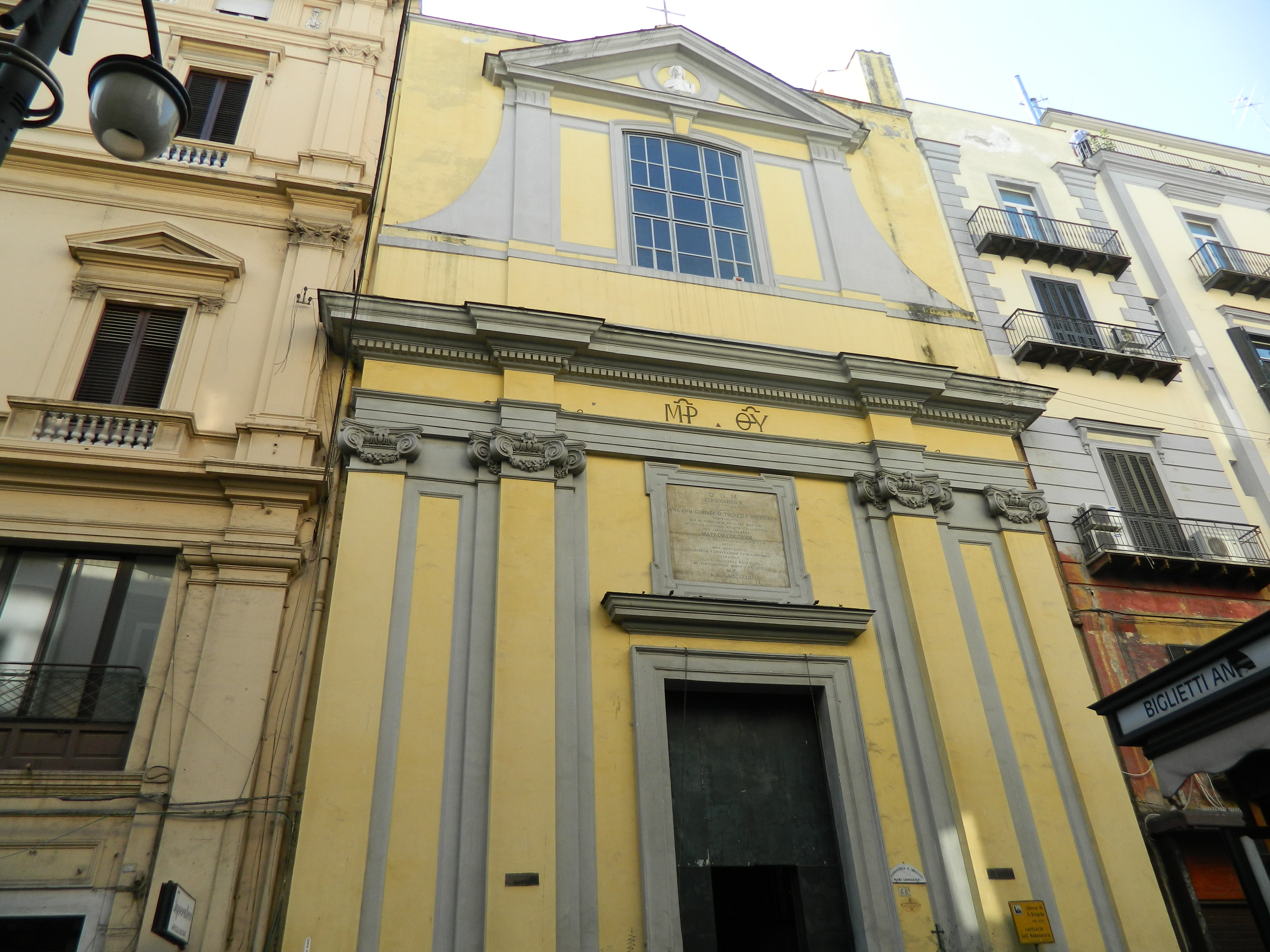
- The façade of church of Santa Brigida.
- Church of Santa Brigida
- 40.838965°N 14.249149°E
- Location: Via Santa Brigida. Naples; Province of Naples, Campania
- Country: Italy
- Denomination: Roman Catholic

History
- Status: Active

Architecture
- Architectural type: Church
- Style: Baroque architecture
- Groundbreaking: 1606
- Completed: 1610

Administration
- Diocese: Roman Catholic Archdiocese of Naples

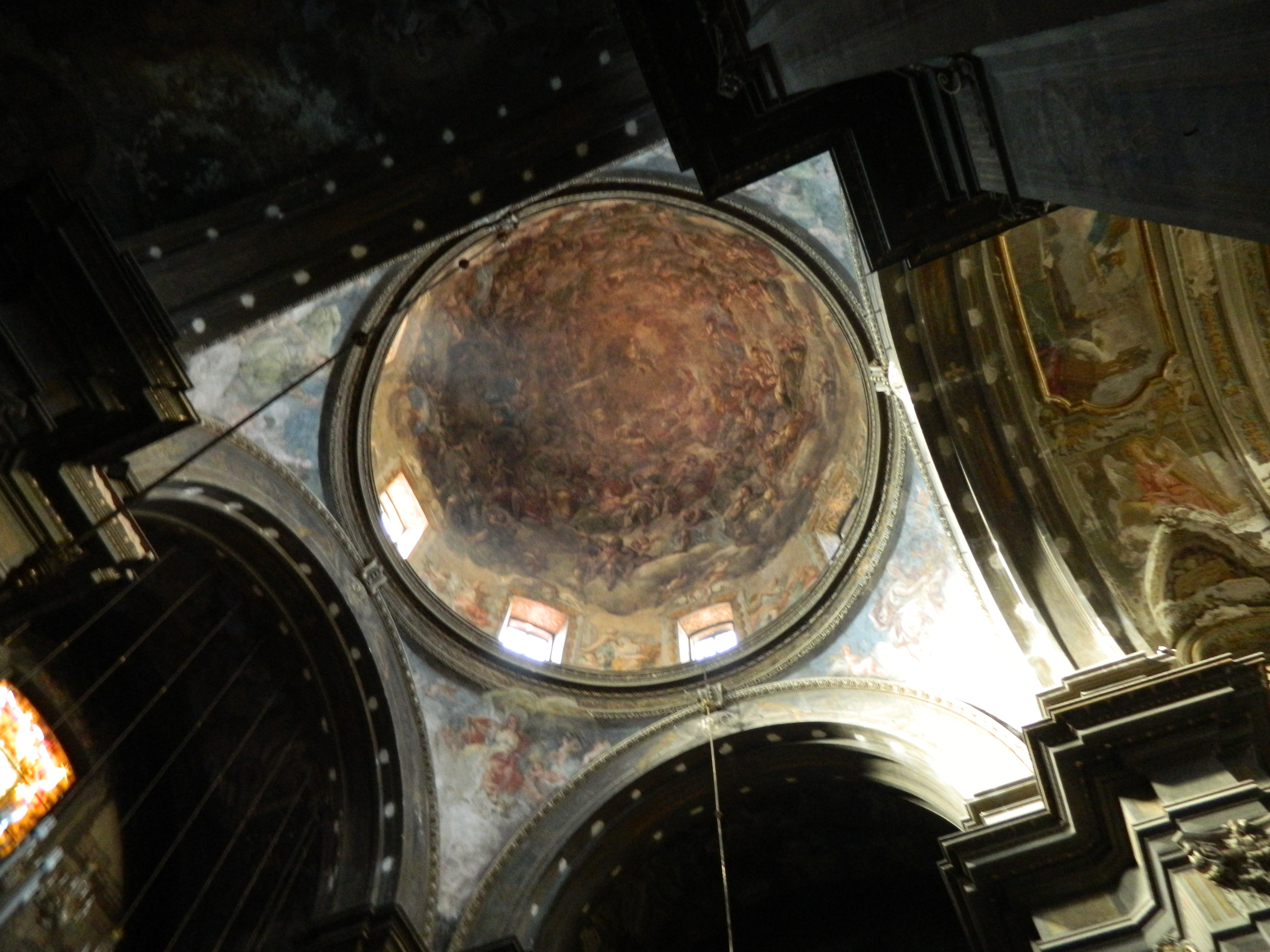
Dome

Santa Brigida is a church located on Via Santa Brigida in central Naples, Italy. The church is a few doors down from one of the entrances to the Galleria Umberto I.

== History ==
The origins of the church date to 1609, when a local merchant Giovanni Antonio Bianco dedicated a chapel to Santa Brigida. He also built a conservatory for widows. But the work was blocked by the curia of Naples, and the structure, with the archbishop's consent, was sold to Giovanna Guevarra, and the church was able to open by 1610 under the Lucchesi fathers, which during 1637-1640 expanded the church and the convent, which now is part of Palazzo Barbaja. Because of its location near the Castel Nuovo, the Spanish authorities demanded that the church only have a low dome (9 metres), which would not have blocked the view from gunners in the Castle. The Lucchese fathers remained until their order was suppressed under the French occupation; they were reinstated during the Bourbon restoration. Ultimately they were again expelled after unification of Italy under the House of Savoy in 1862.

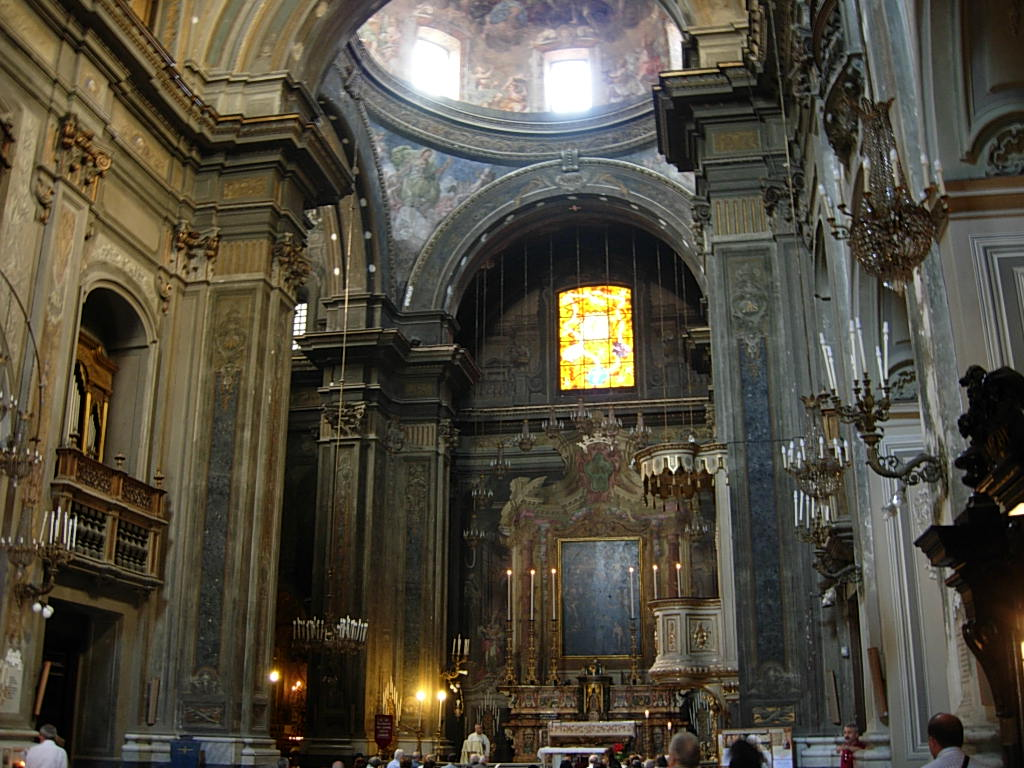
Interior

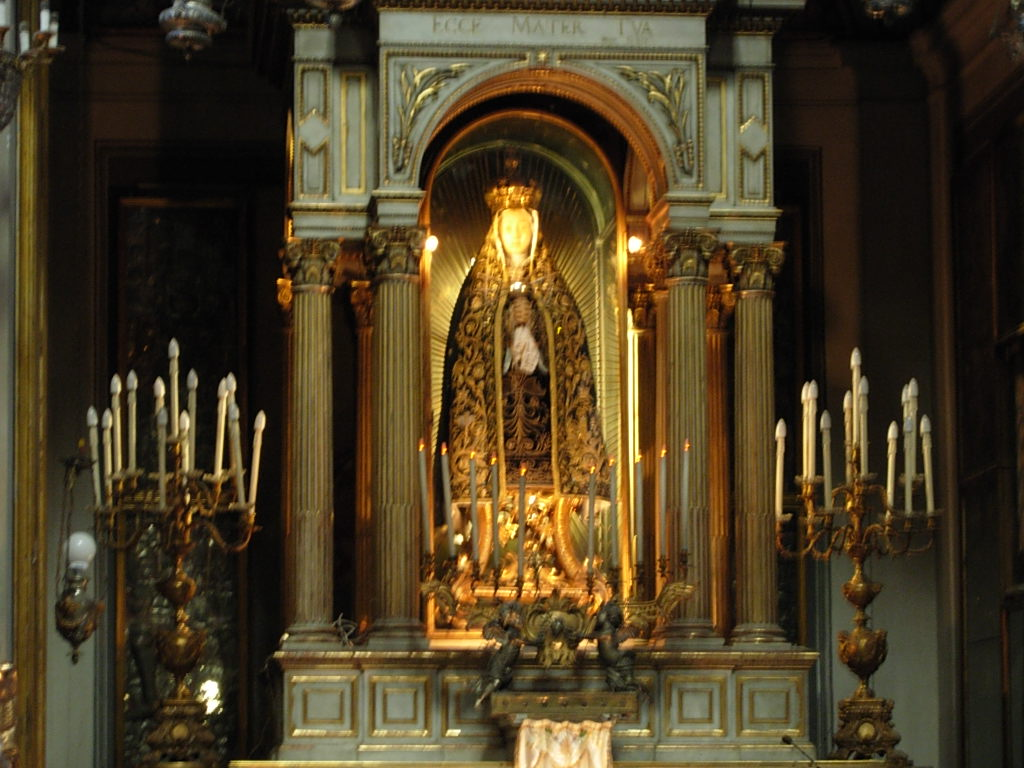
Statua della Madonna Addolorata

The interior, in Latin cross with chapels, displays gran Baroque pictorial cycles: Glory of Santa Brigida, St Nicola, The Last Judgment and The Passion, by Luca Giordano. The painter himself is buried in the church. Some of the Giordano paintings were completed by his pupil, Giuseppe Simonelli. Other painters active in the church include Massimo Stanzione and Paolo De Matteis.

The dome has an artificial vanishing point painted by Giordano, which makes it look more slender. The chapel of Our Lady of Sorrows has a much revered statue. The Church is the historic seat of the Military Order of the Most Holy Saviour and St. Bridget of Sweden

== Bibliography ==
- Renato Ruotolo, Santa Brigida, 1999.
- Gennaro Aspreno Galante, Le Chiese di Napoli. Guida Sacra della Città di Napoli, Napoli, XIX secolo.
- Dario Nicolella, Le cupole di Napoli, Napoli, 1997
- Francesco Ferraironi, Il Santuario di s. Brigida in Napoli : storia, arte, culto, Roma, 1931
