= Pope Paschal II =

Head of the Catholic Church from 1099 to 1118

- Bishop of Rome
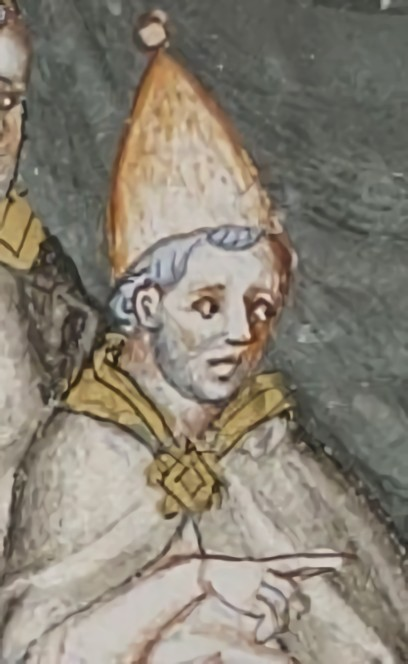
- 14th century miniature of Paschal II
- Church: Catholic Church
- Papacy began: 13 August 1099
- Papacy ended: 21 January 1118
- Predecessor: Urban II
- Successor: Gelasius II
- Previous posts: Cardinal-Priest of San Clemente (1073–78); Legate to France and Spain (1089–90)

Orders
- Created cardinal: 1073 by Gregory VII
- Rank: Cardinal Priest (1073 - 1078) Cardinal Bishop (1078 - 1099)

Personal details
- Born: Raniero Raineri di Bleda; 1050–55 Bleda or Galeata, March of Tuscany, Holy Roman Empire
- Died: 21 January 1118 (aged c. 63–68) Rome, Papal States

Pope Paschal II (Latin: Paschalis II; 1050 x 1055 – 21 January 1118), born Raniero Raineri di Bleda, was head of the Catholic Church and ruler of the Papal States from 13 August 1099 to his death in 1118. A monk of the Abbey of Cluny, he was created the cardinal-priest of San Clemente by Pope Gregory VII (1073–85) in 1073. He was consecrated as pope in succession to Pope Urban II (1088–99) on 19 August 1099. His reign of almost twenty years was exceptionally long for a medieval pope.

== Early career ==
Ranierius was born in Bleda, near Forlì, Romagna. He became a monk at Cluny at an early age.

== Papacy ==
=== Early pontificate ===
After Pope Urban II's death, Paschal reacted to the success of the First Crusade by preaching the penitential Crusade of 1101.

During the early part of his pontificate, Paschal also continued to develop papal policy in the context of the ongoing Investiture Controversy. He zealously carried on the Hildebrandine policy in favor of papal privilege, though with only partial success.

Henry V, son of Emperor Henry IV, took advantage of his father's excommunication to rebel, even to the point of seeking out Paschal for absolution for associating with his father.

The imperial Diet at Mainz invited Paschal to visit Germany and settle the dispute in January 1106, but the pope at the Council of Guastalla (October 1106) simply renewed the prohibition of investiture.

In the same early phase of his pontificate, he brought to an end the investiture struggle in England, in which Anselm, archbishop of Canterbury, had been engaged with King Henry I, by retaining to himself exclusive right to invest with the ring and crozier, but recognizing royal nomination to vacant benefices and the oath of fealty for temporal domains.

Paschal also went to France at the close of 1106 to seek the mediation of King Philip I and his son Louis in the imperial struggle, returning to Italy in September 1107, his negotiations remaining without result. During this trip, he consecrated the Cluniac church of Notre Dame at La Charité-sur-Loire, the second largest church in Europe at the time.

=== Investiture Controversy (1107–1111) ===
During the later phase of escalating conflict with Henry V, the dispute over investiture intensified.

When Henry V advanced with an army into Italy in order to be crowned, the pope agreed to a compact in February 1111 which stipulated that before receiving the imperial crown, Henry was to abjure all claims to investitures, whilst the pope undertook to compel the prelates and abbots of the empire to restore all the temporal rights and privileges which they held from the crown.

Preparations were made for the coronation on 12 February 1111, but the Romans rose in revolt against Henry, and the German king retired, taking the pope and Curia with him.

After 61 days of harsh imprisonment, during which Prince Robert I of Capua's Norman army was repulsed on its rescue mission, Paschal yielded and guaranteed investiture to the emperor. Henry V was then crowned in St. Peter's on 13 April 1111, and, after exacting a promise that no revenge would be taken for what had happened, withdrew beyond the Alps.

The Hildebrandine party was aroused to action, however; a Lateran council of March 1112 declared null and void the concessions extorted by violence; a council held at Vienne in October 1111 excommunicated the emperor; and Paschal sanctioned the proceeding.

=== Post-crisis governance (1112–1116) ===
Following the crisis of 1111, Paschal continued to face unresolved tensions with both imperial and royal authorities.

During Paschal's papacy some efforts were made by the Byzantine Emperor Alexios I to bridge the schism between the Orthodox and the Catholic Church, but these failed, as Paschal pressed the demand that the patriarch of Constantinople recognise the pope's primacy over "all the churches of God throughout the world" in late 1112.

Paschal issued the bull Pie postulatio voluntatis on 15 February 1113, bringing under Papal protection and confirming as a religious order the Hospital of Saint John of Jerusalem, later known as the Knights Hospitaller and today known as the Sovereign Military Order of Malta. It also confirmed the order's acquisitions and donations in Europe and Asia and exempted it from all authority save that of the pope.

Toward this same period, Paschal complained in 1115 that councils were held and bishops translated without his authorization, and he threatened Henry I with excommunication.

Matilda of Tuscany was said to have bequeathed all her allodial lands to the Church upon her death in 1115, but the donation was neither publicly acknowledged in Rome nor is any documentary record of the donation preserved. Emperor Henry V at once laid claim to Matilda's lands as imperial fiefs and forced the pope to flee from Rome.

In 1116, at the behest of Count Ramon Berenguer III of Barcelona, Paschal issued a crusade for the capture of Tarragona.

Paschal also ordered the building of the basilica of Santi Quattro Coronati on the ashes of the one burned during the Norman sack of Rome in 1084. It was restored and consecrated in 1116.

=== Death ===
Paschal returned to Rome after the emperor's withdrawal at the beginning of 1118, but died within a few days, on 21 January 1118."

== See also ==
- First Council of the Lateran
- Concordat of Worms
- Cardinals created by Paschal II
- 1099 papal election

Catholic Church titles
Preceded by Urban II	Pope; 1099–1118	Succeeded by Gelasius II
