= Celle di Vernio =

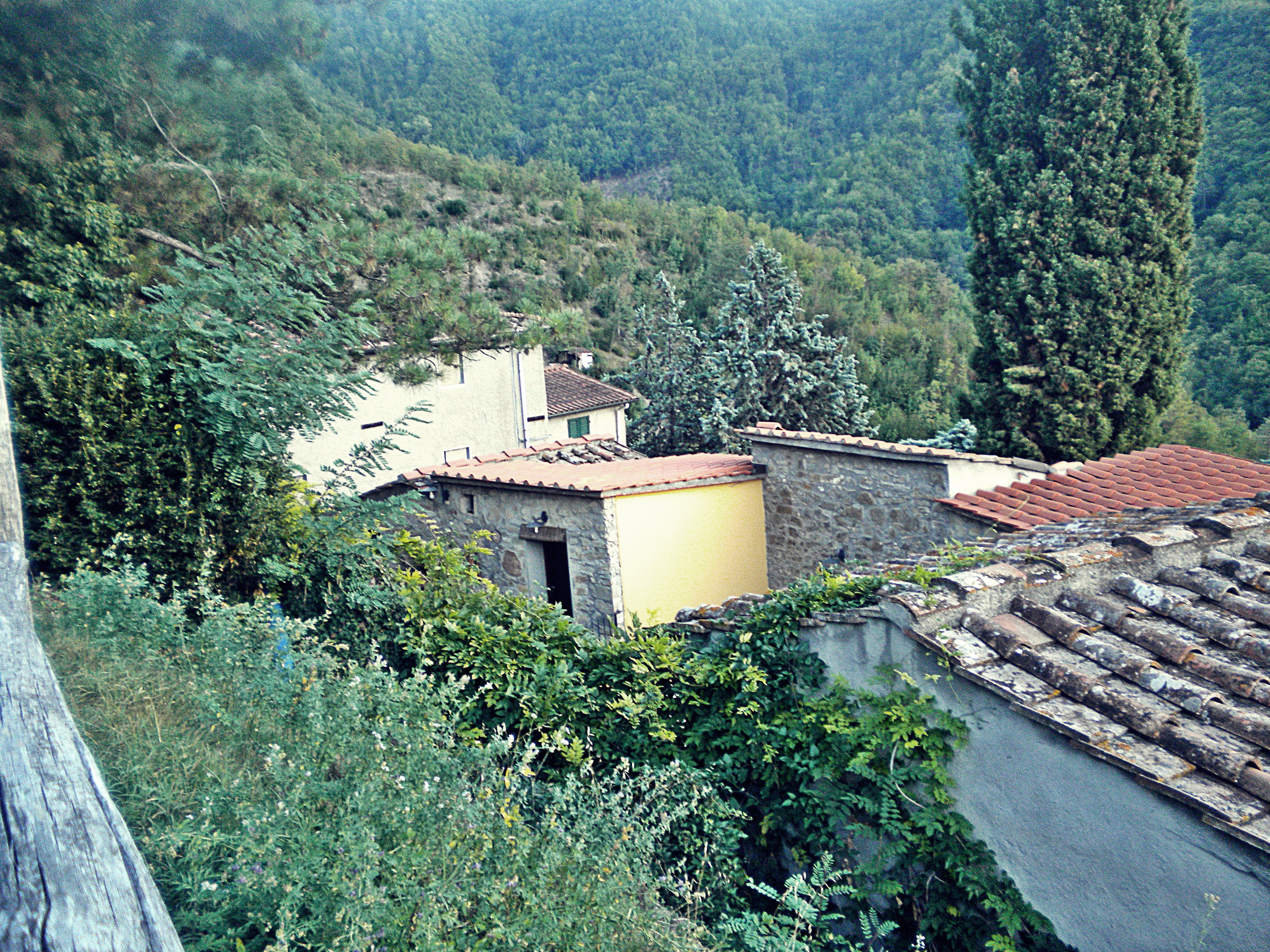
Borgo Corboli

Celle is a village of Vernio in the Italian region of Tuscany. From the village it is possible to observe the Bisenzio valley and the villages of Cavarzano San Quirico d'Orcia.

== Gallery ==
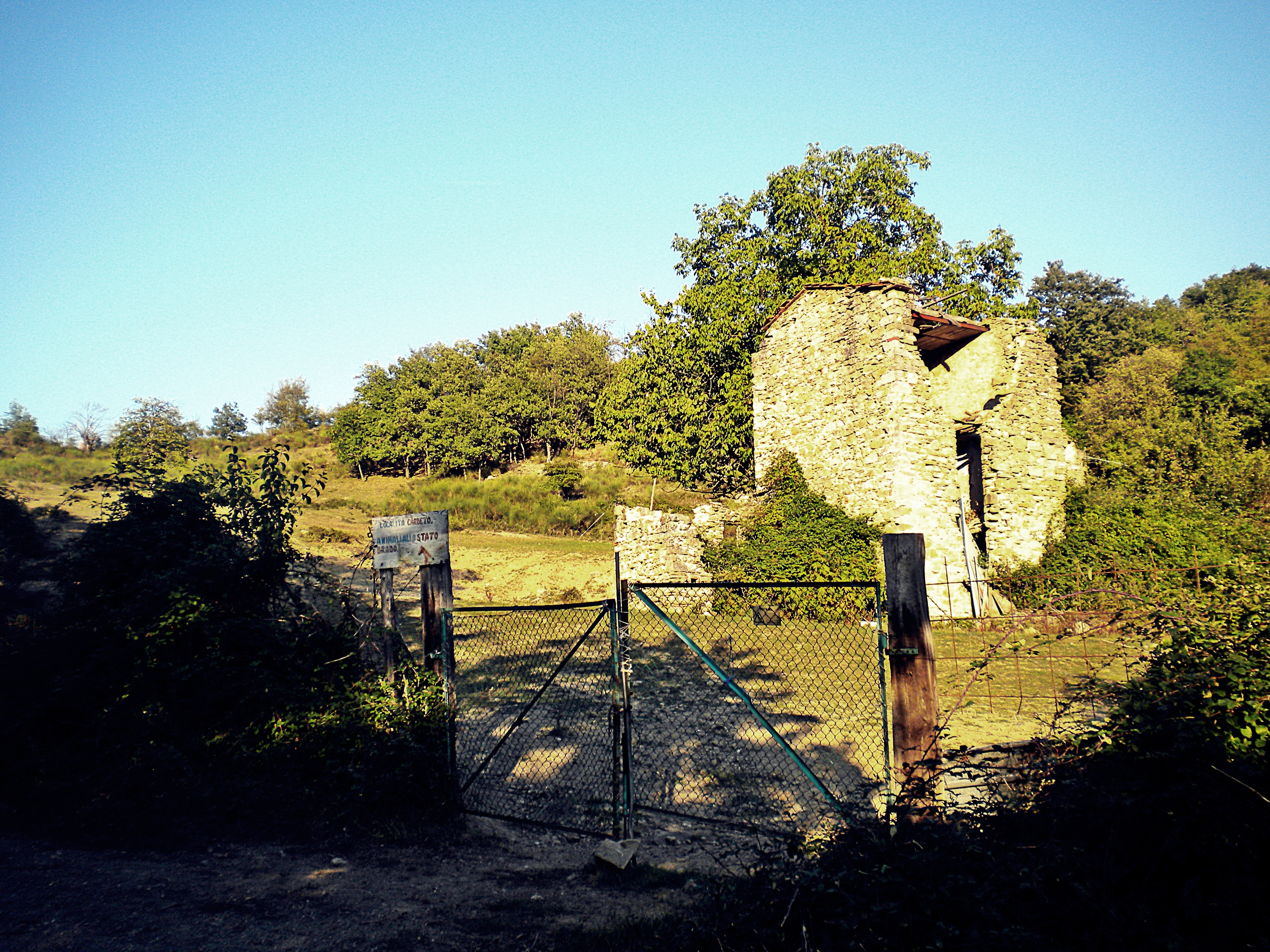
Cardeto tower

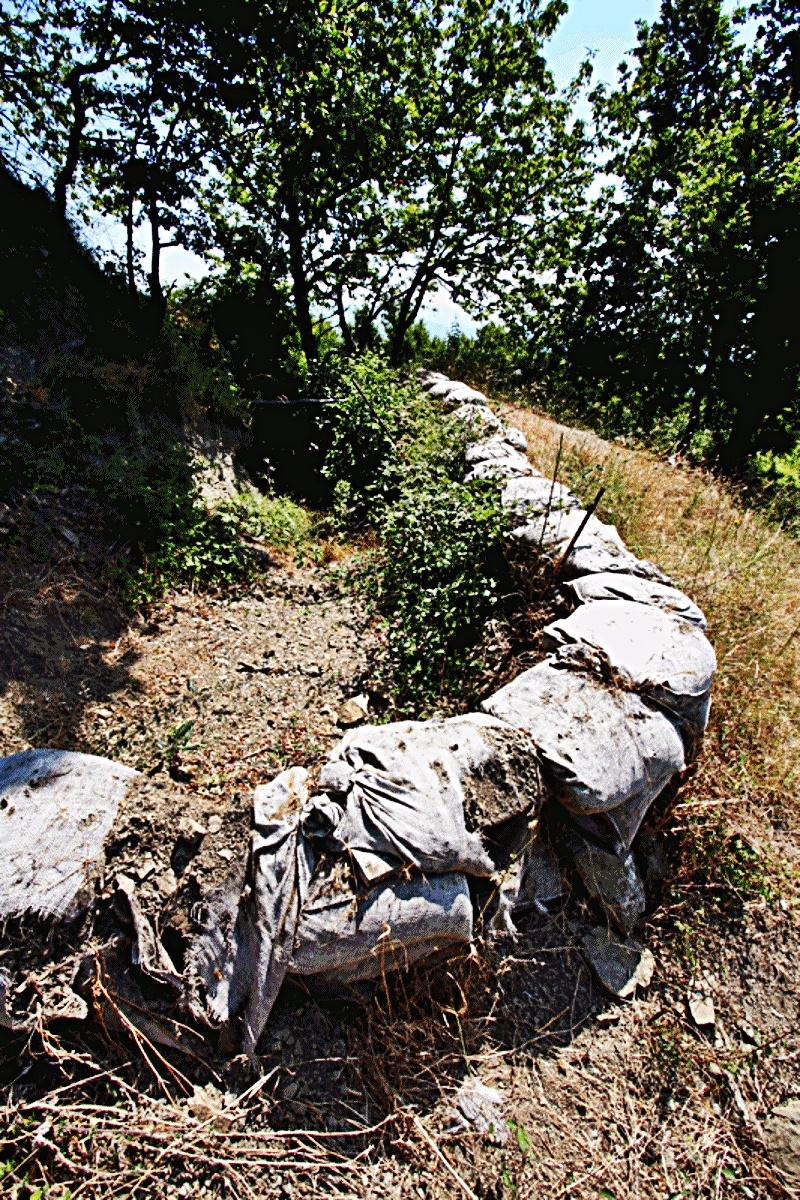
Memorial Park of the gothic line

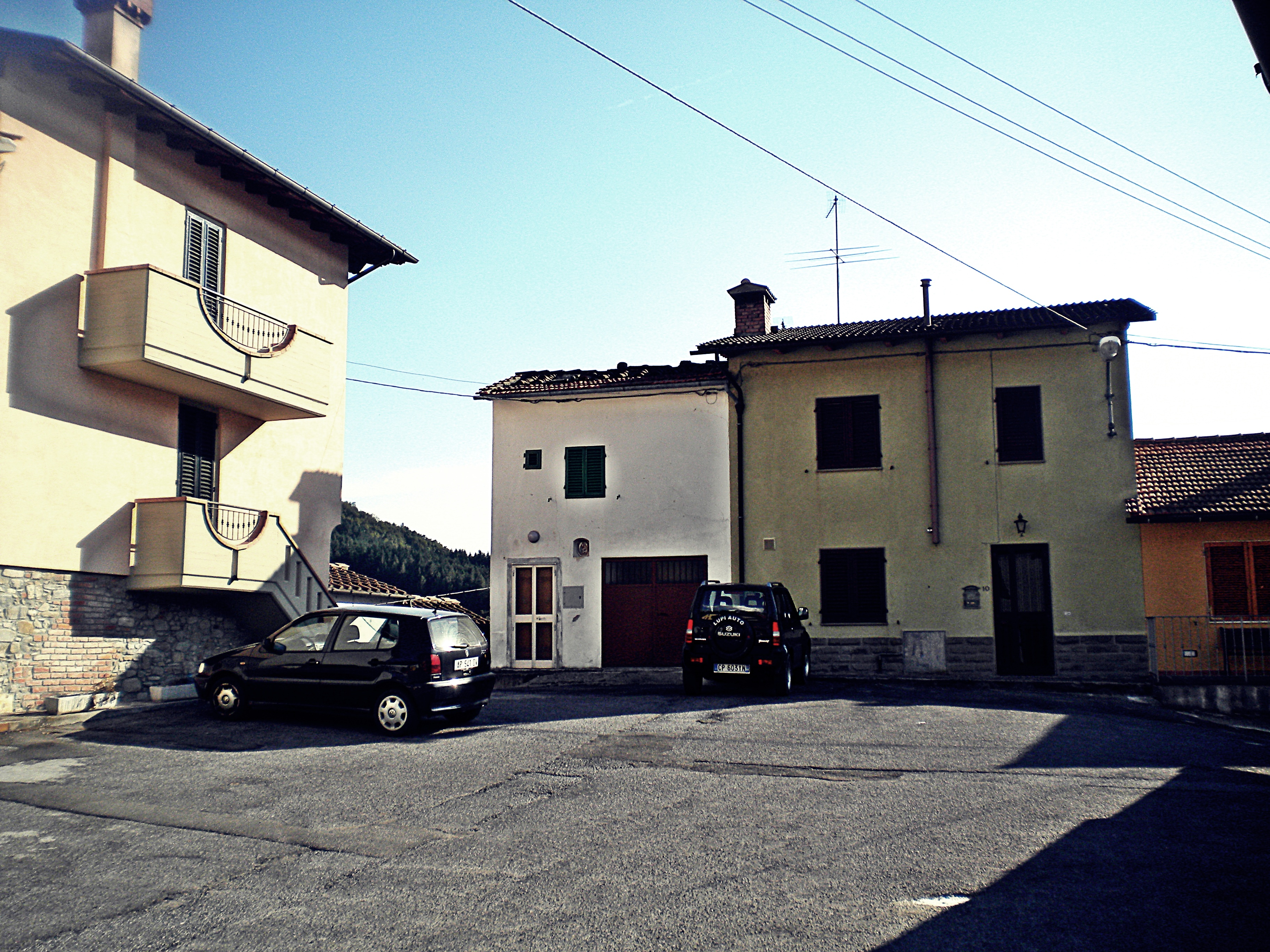
Celle
