= Bagno Vignoni =

- Frazione
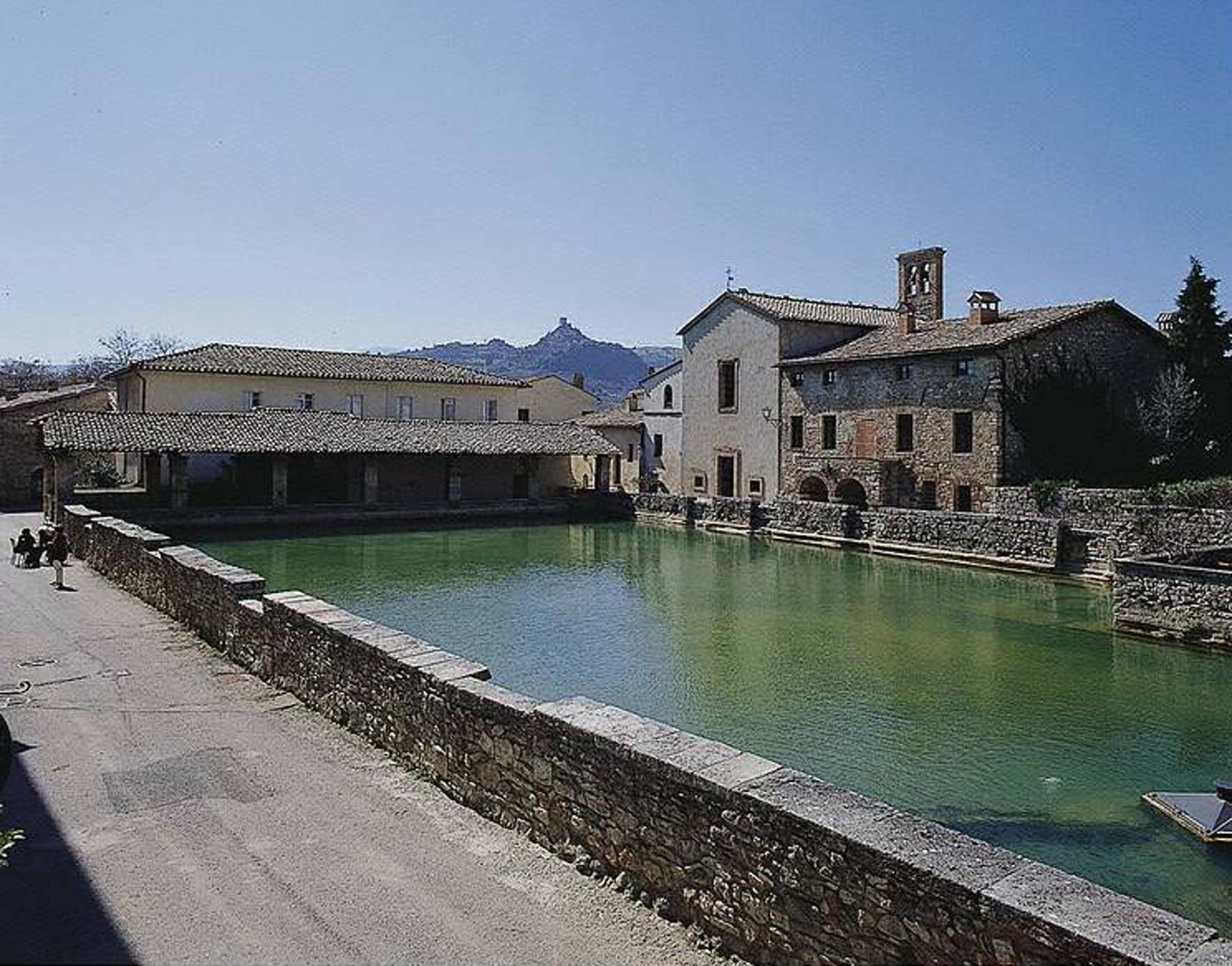
- The bath and San Giovanni Battista church

- Location of Bagno Vignoni in Italy
- Coordinates: 43°1′40.39″N 11°37′5.93″E
- Country: Italy
- Region: Tuscany
- Province: Siena (SI)
- Comune: San Quirico d'Orcia
- Elevation: 306 m (1,004 ft)

Population (2001)
  - Total: 30
- Demonym: Vignonesi
- Time zone: UTC+1 (CET)
  - Summer (DST): UTC+2 (CEST)
- Postal code: 53027
- Dialing code: (+39) 0577

Bagno Vignoni is an Italian village and hamlet (frazione) of San Quirico d'Orcia, situated on a hill above the Val d'Orcia in Tuscany. It is a popular tourist destination and well known for its hot springs.

== History ==
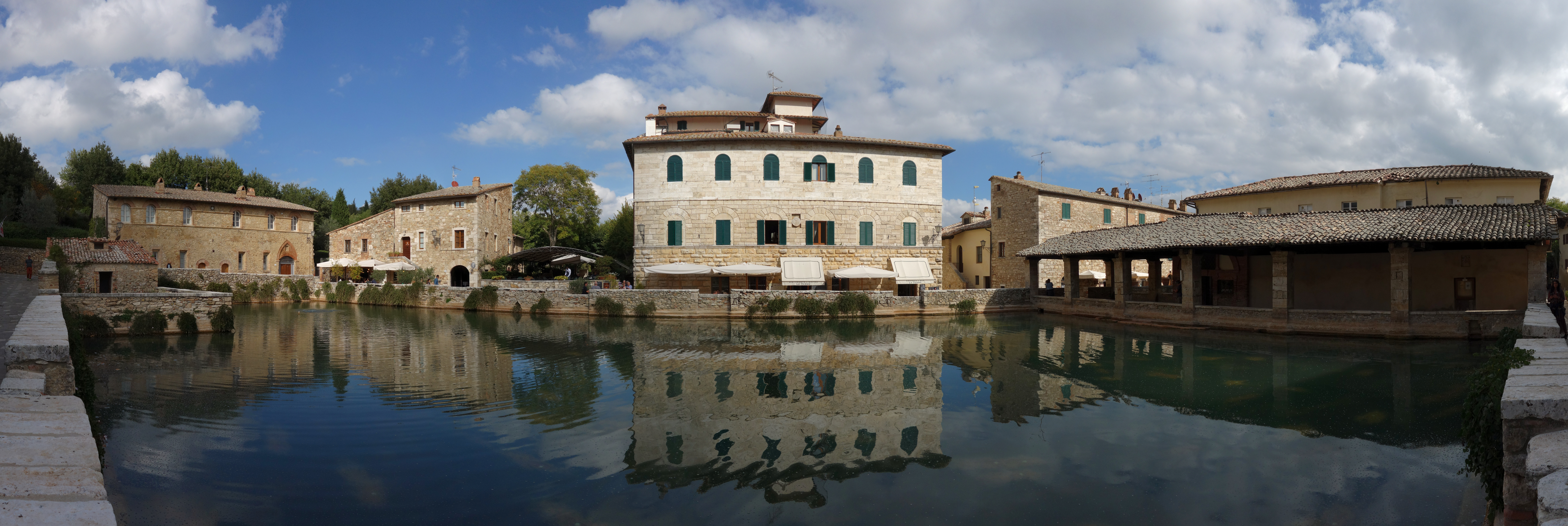
Panorama of the bath and Piazza delle Sorgenti

The ancient village of Bagno Vignoni is located in the heart of Tuscany, in the Val d'Orcia Natural Park. Thanks to the Via Francigena (which was the main route followed by pilgrims in antiquity who went to Rome), these thermal waters were found and have been used since Roman times. At the heart of the village is the "Square of sources", namely a rectangular tank, of sixteenth-century origin, which contains the original source of water that comes from the subterranean aquifer of volcanic origins. Since the Etruscans and Romans - as evidenced by the numerous archaeological finds - the spa of Bagno Vignoni was attended by eminent personalities such as Pope Pius II, Saint Catherine of Siena, Lorenzo the Magnificent and many other artists who had elected the village as their main holiday resort. Characteristic of Bagno Vignoni, besides the thermal waters, are its structure, despite numerous incidents of war, devastation and fires that involved the Val d'Orcia in the Middle Ages, remains essentially unchanged since then. From Bagno Vignoni, one can easily reach the historical centres of nearby Pienza and Montalcino, and the general Val d'Orcia area, including the Park of Mount Amiata.

== Geography ==
Located on a hill surrounded by the valley of Orcia river, that flows south of the village, Bagno Vignoni is four kilometres north of Castiglione d'Orcia, 5,5 south of San Quirico d'Orcia, 13 south of Pienza, and 50 south of Siena. The central square of Bagno Vignoni, in which is located a large pool (Baths of St. Catherine), is named Piazza delle Sorgenti (i.e.: "Springs' Square"). The upper side of the village is named Vignoni Alto (i.e.: Upper Vignoni).

== Main sights ==
- Old town with the Old Baths of St. Catherine (Antiche Terme di Santa Caterina) and the church of St. John the Baptist.
- Mills Park (Parco dei Mulini), located below the village, near the river Orcia. The exploitation of the thermal spring, with its constant flow rate, allowed milling even in summer when most mills were inoperative due to low river flow.
- A well-stocked bookshop inside a historic building from the 1600s, with a 5 meter high wall full of books.

== Popular culture ==
Bagno Vignoni was the location in which the majority of Andrei Tarkovsky's 1983 film Nostalghia were shot. Also some scenes of Al lupo al lupo, a Carlo Verdone's 1992 film, were shot in the village. The Succession episode Chiantishire had certain scenes filmed in the village's baths.

== Gallery ==
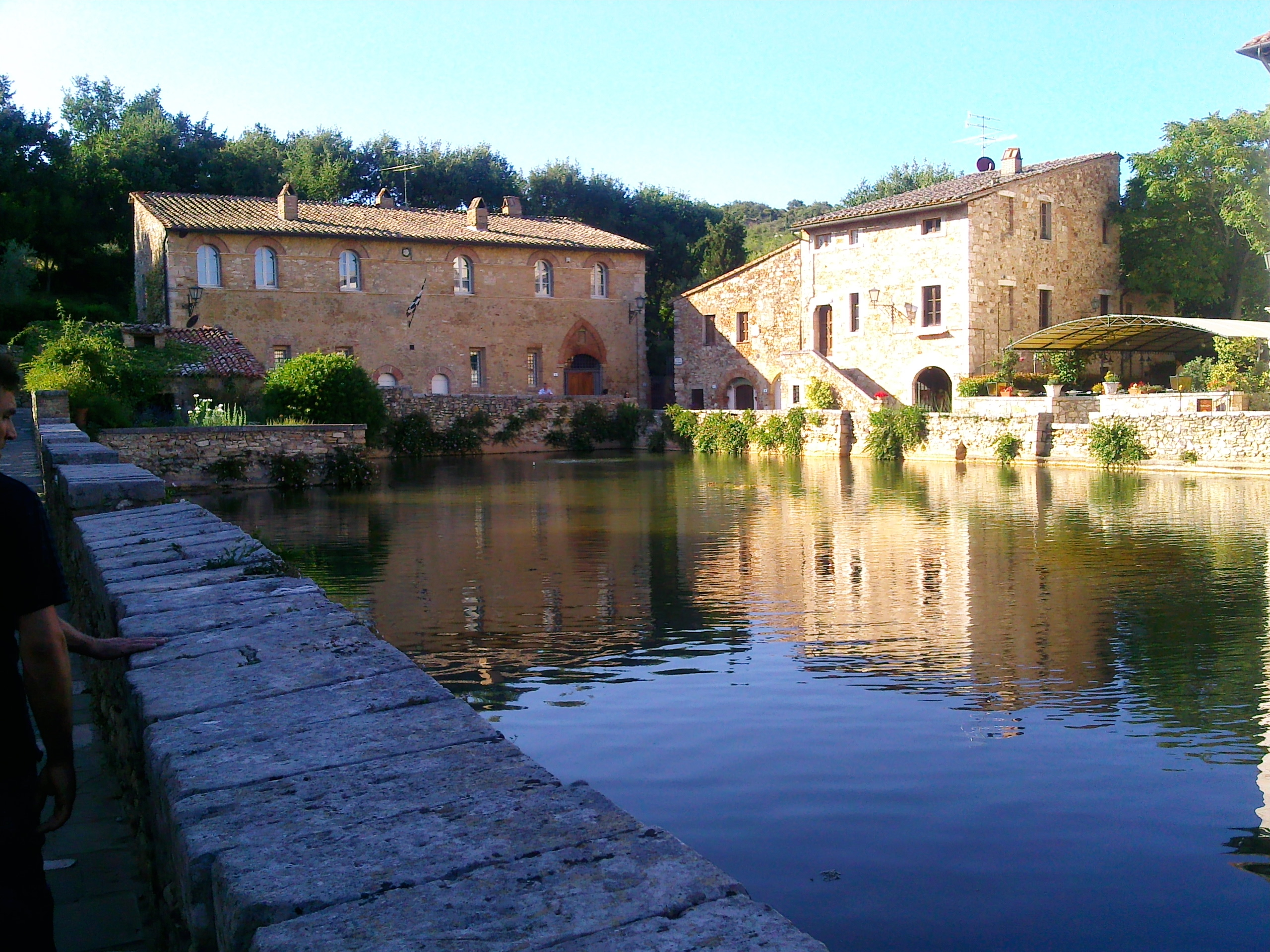
View of the bath

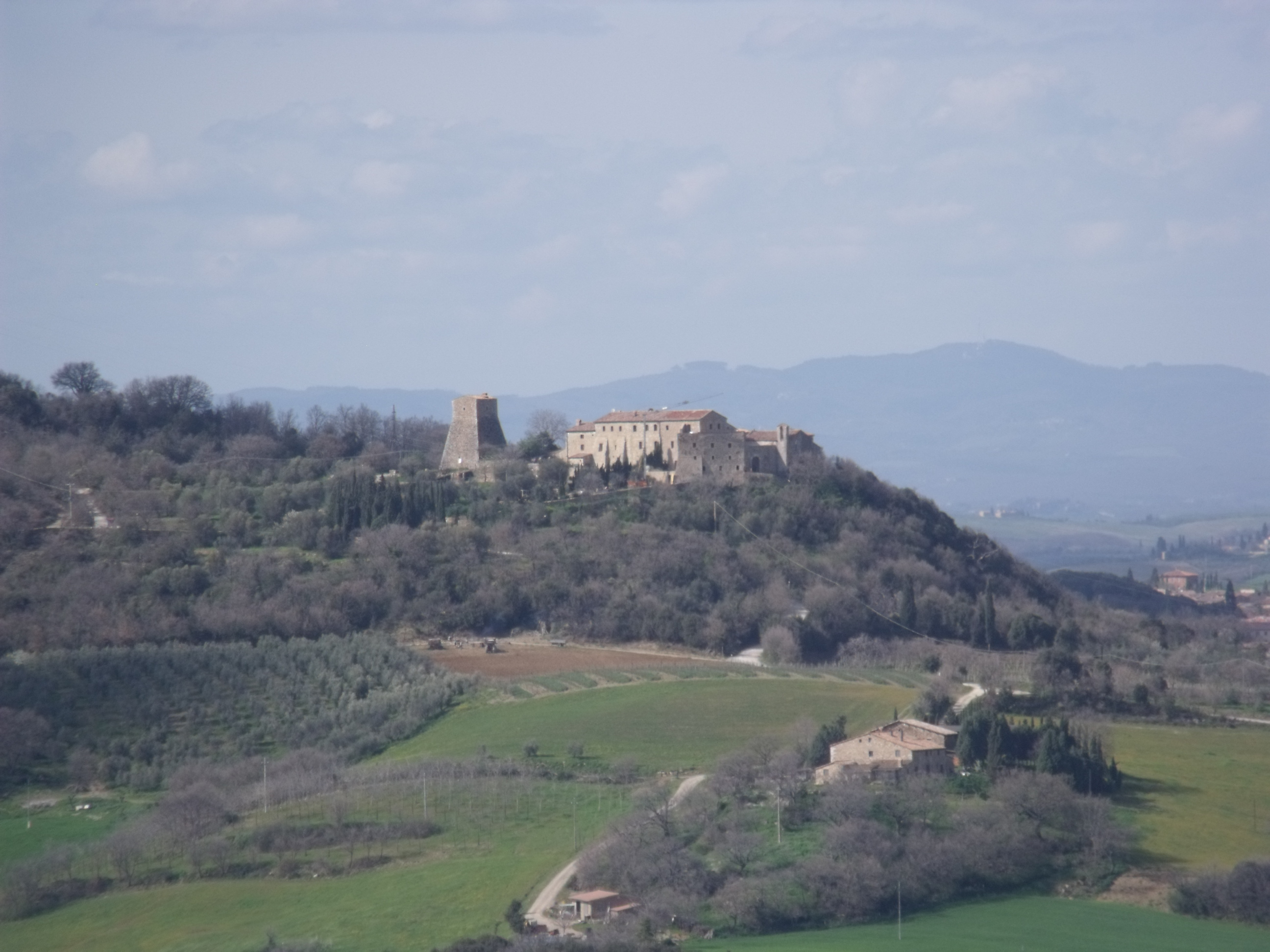
Panoramic view from the surrounding hills

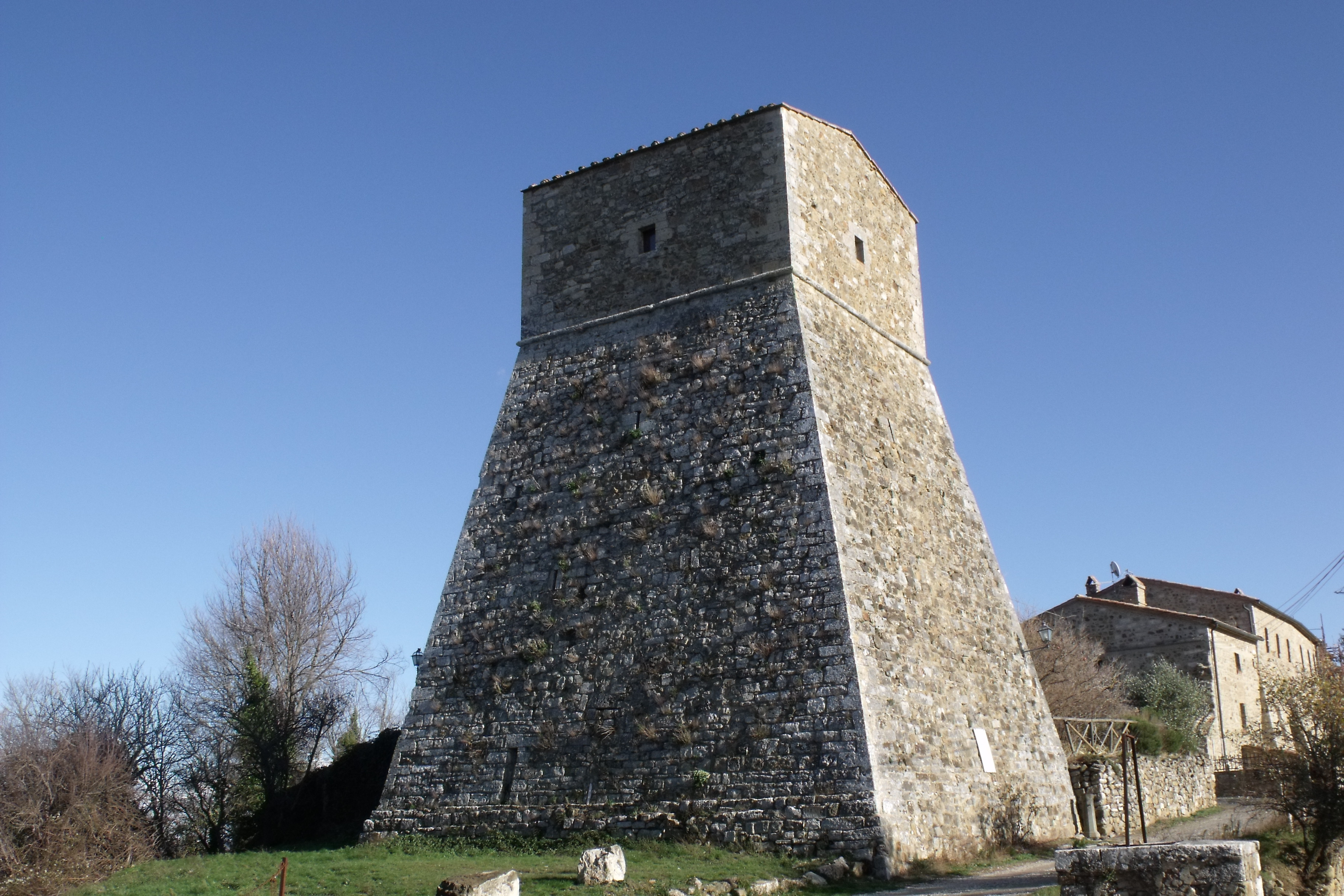
The rock of Bagno Vignoni

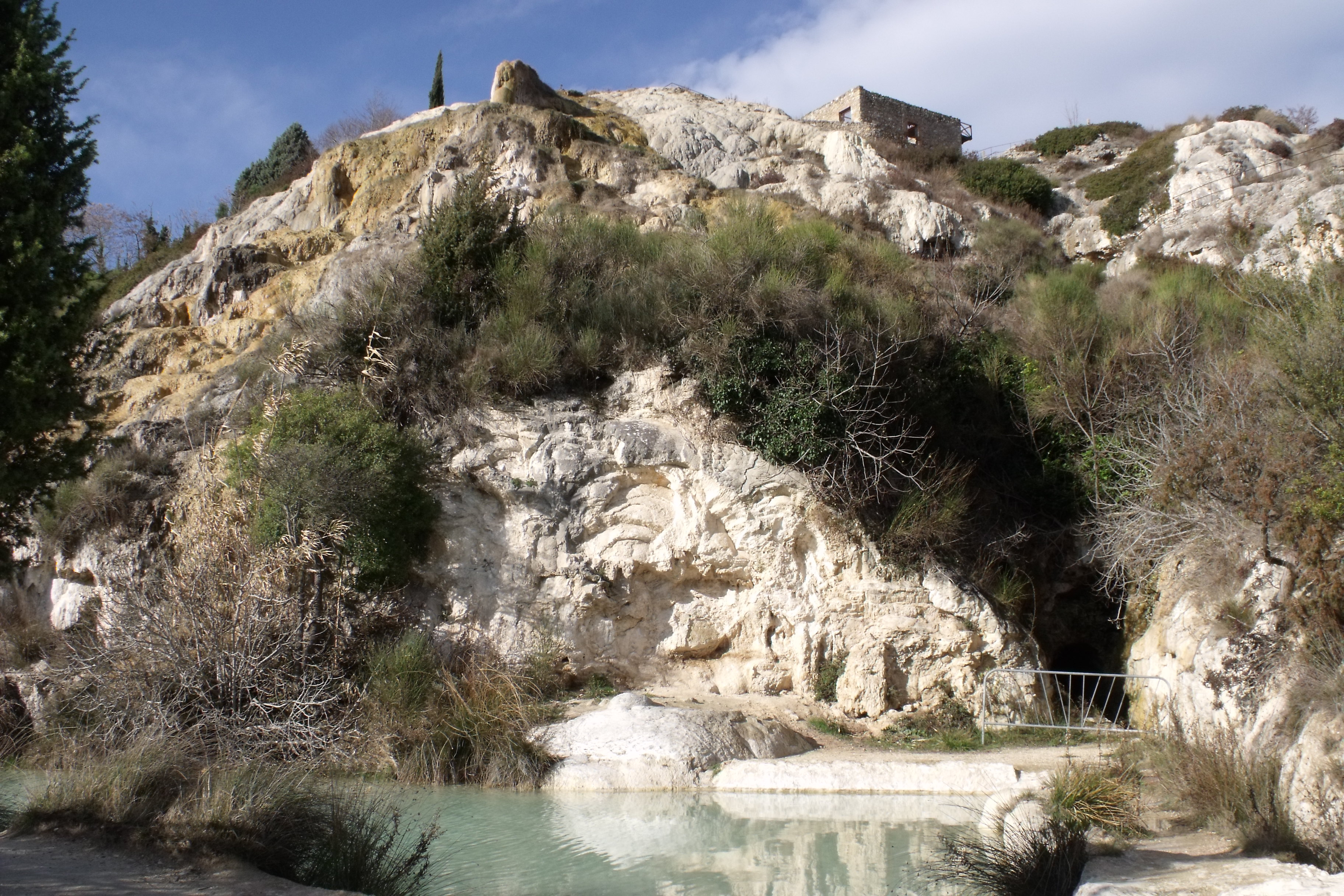
The caves along Orcia river

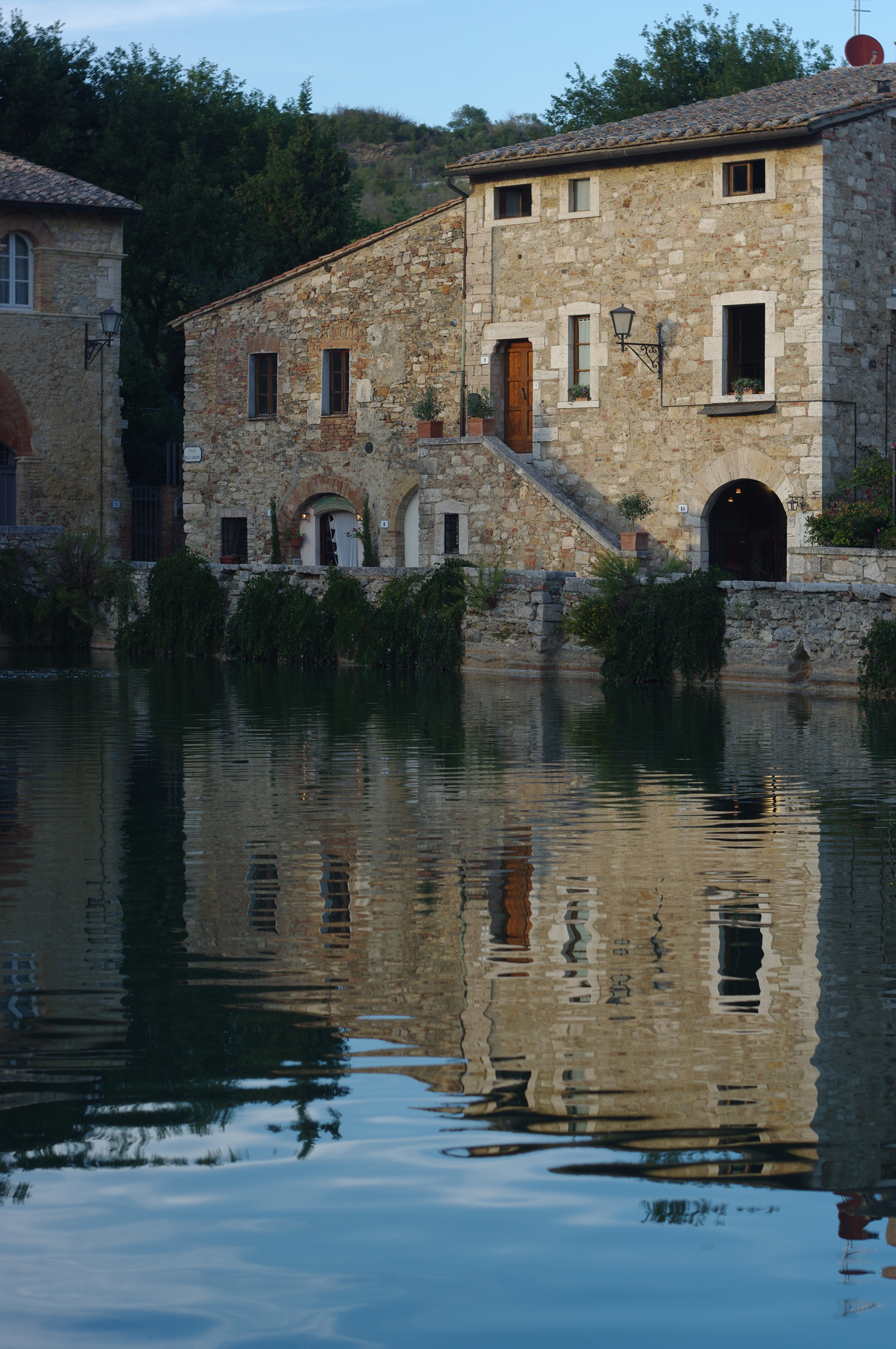
House overlooking the bath

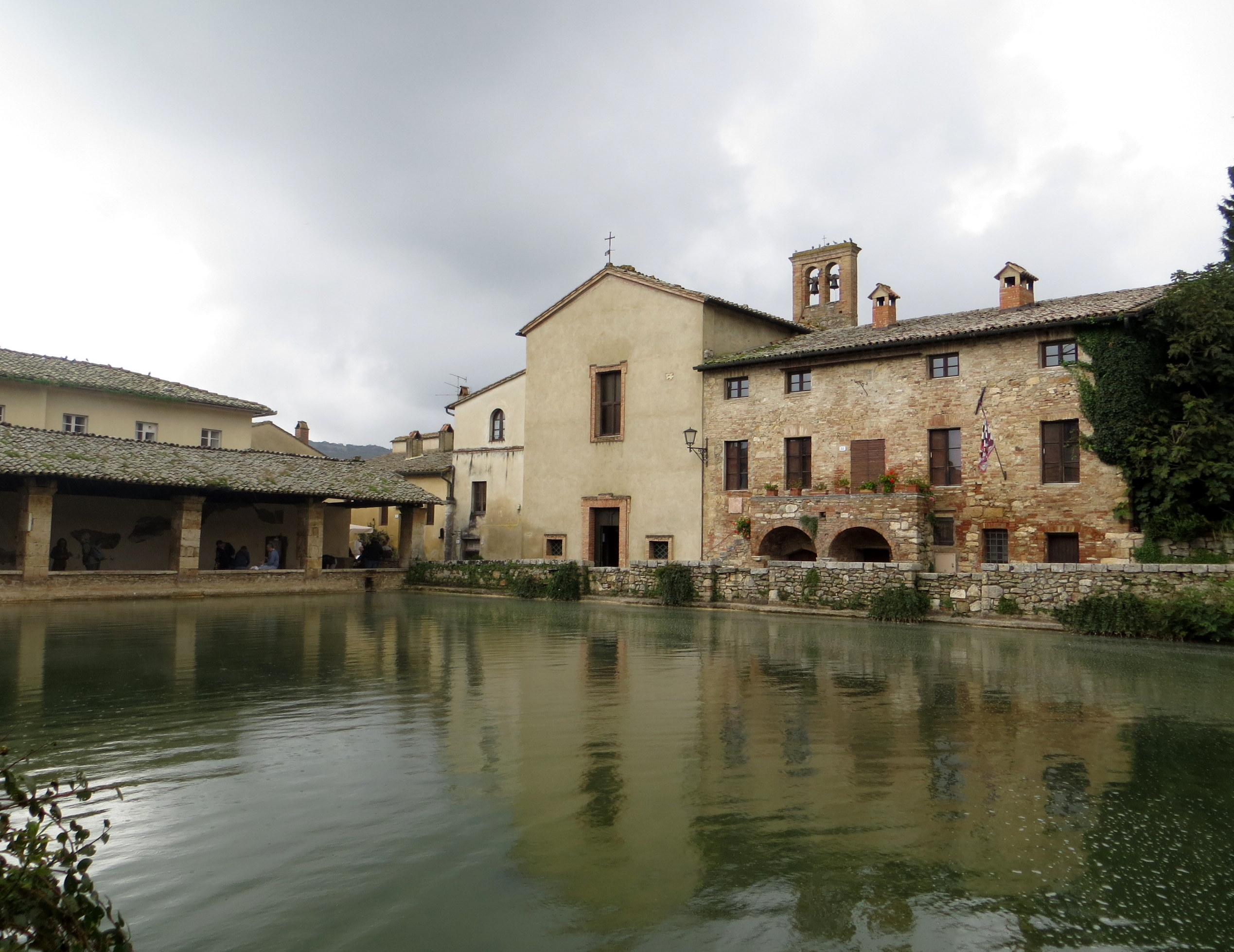
View of the bath

== See also ==
- List of hot springs
