= Cavarzano =

Village in Tuscany, Italy

Coordinates: 44.057°N 11.126°E

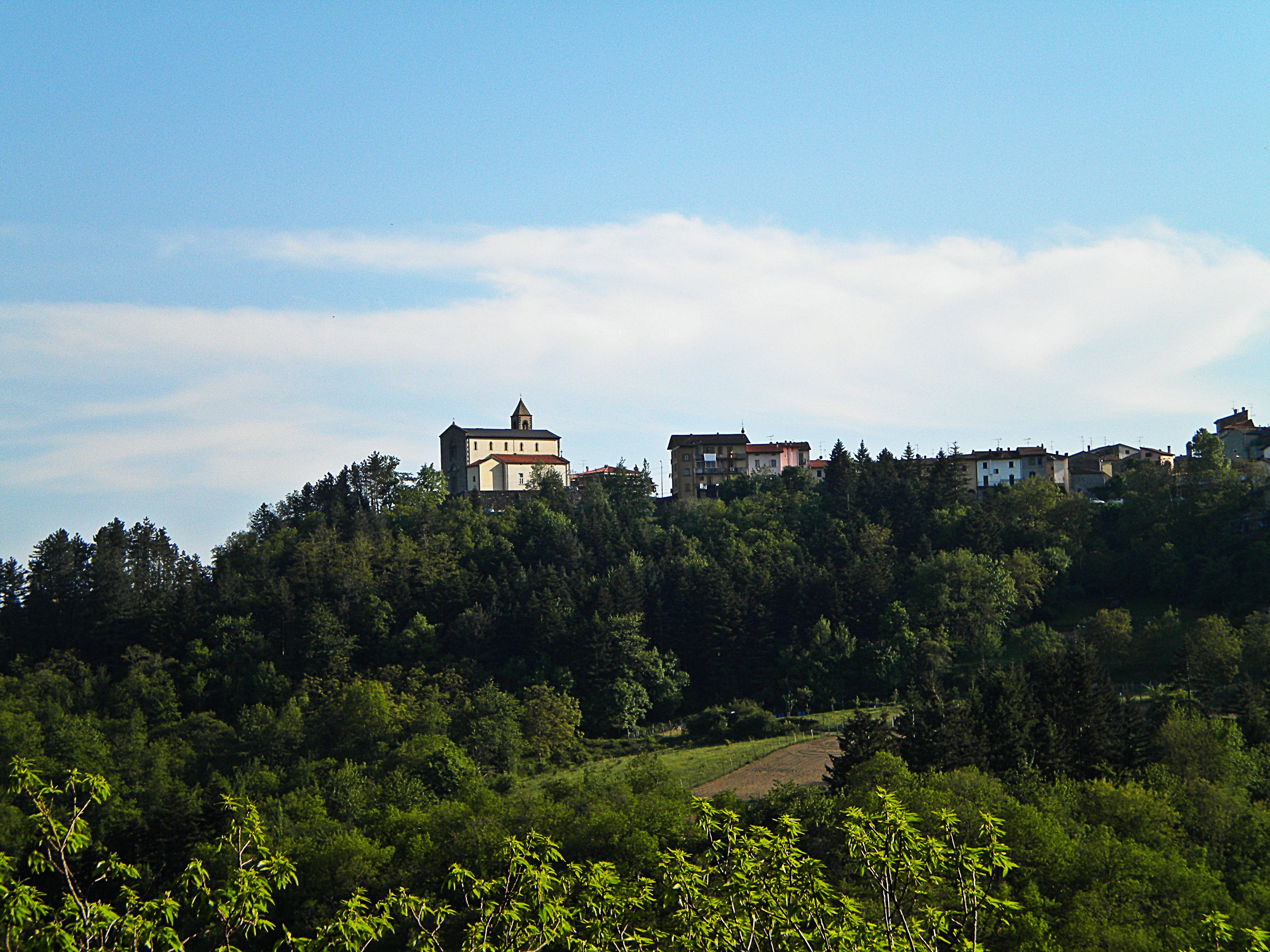
Cavarzano view

Cavarzano is a village in the municipality of Vernio in the Italian region of Tuscany. The village is 600 meters above sea level and has a population of approximately 200. Due to tourism, the population in the summer expands to about 1,200. A prominent landmark in the village is the San Pietro church.

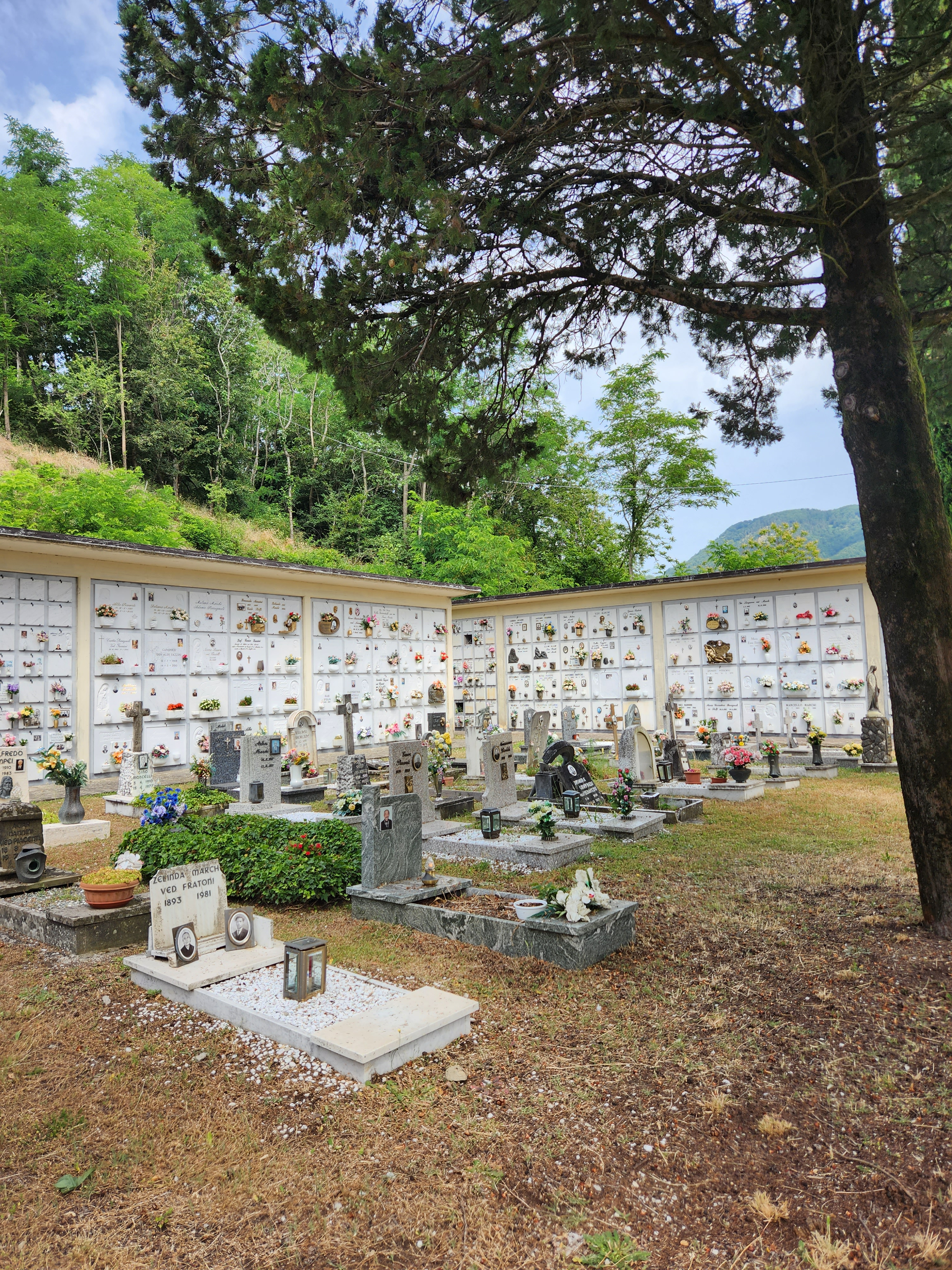

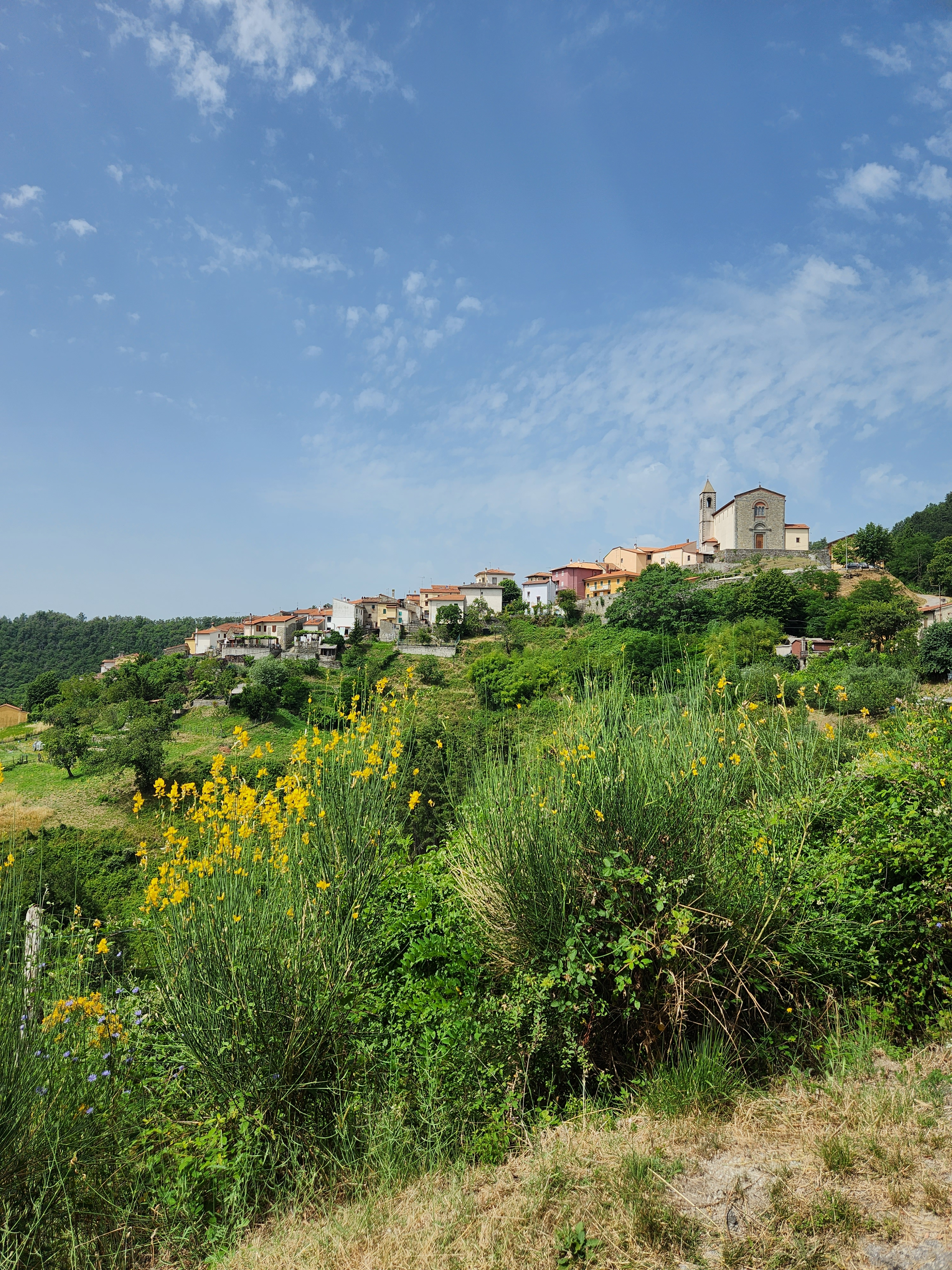

== Gallery ==
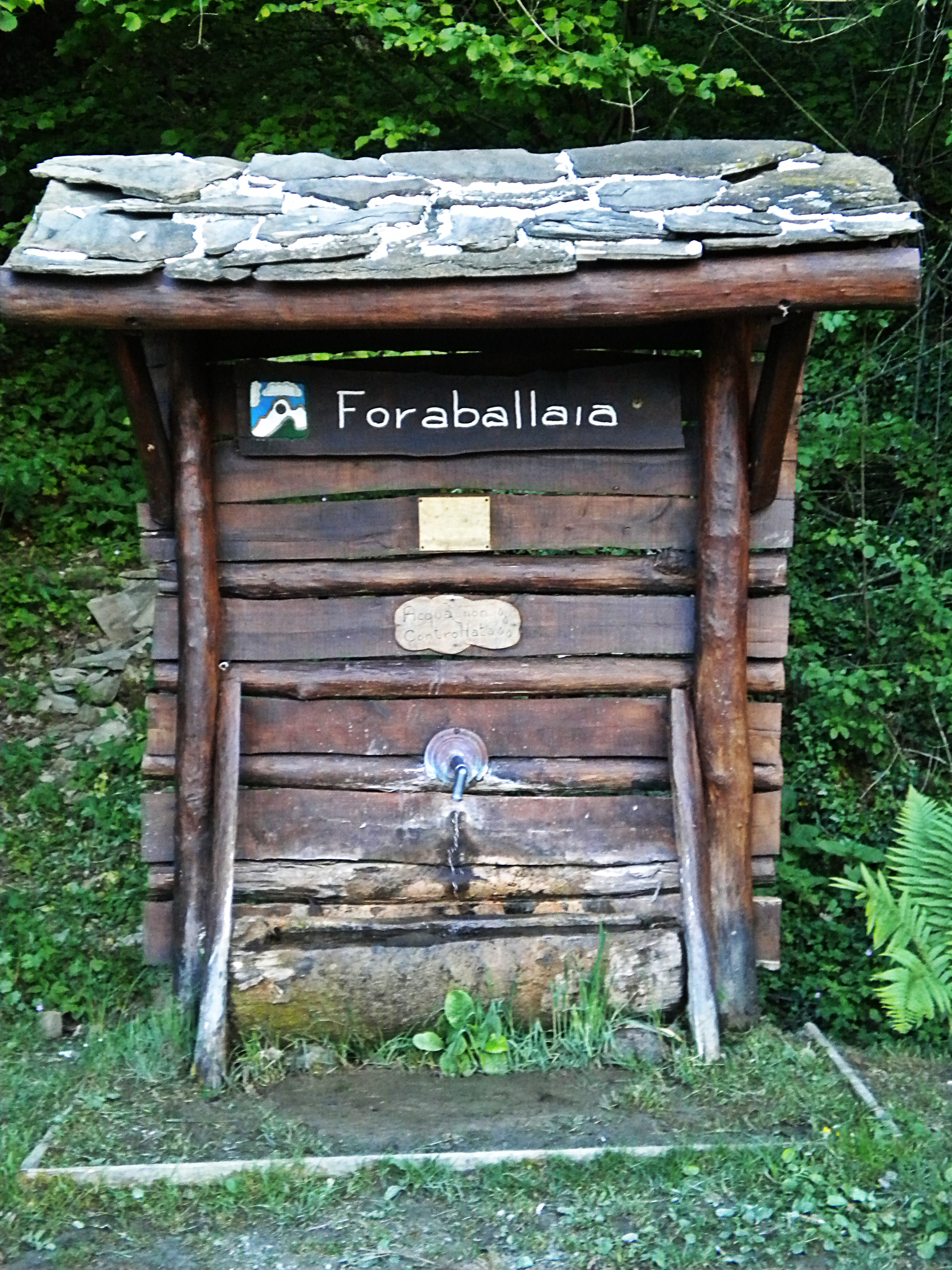
Foraballaia (Fountain)

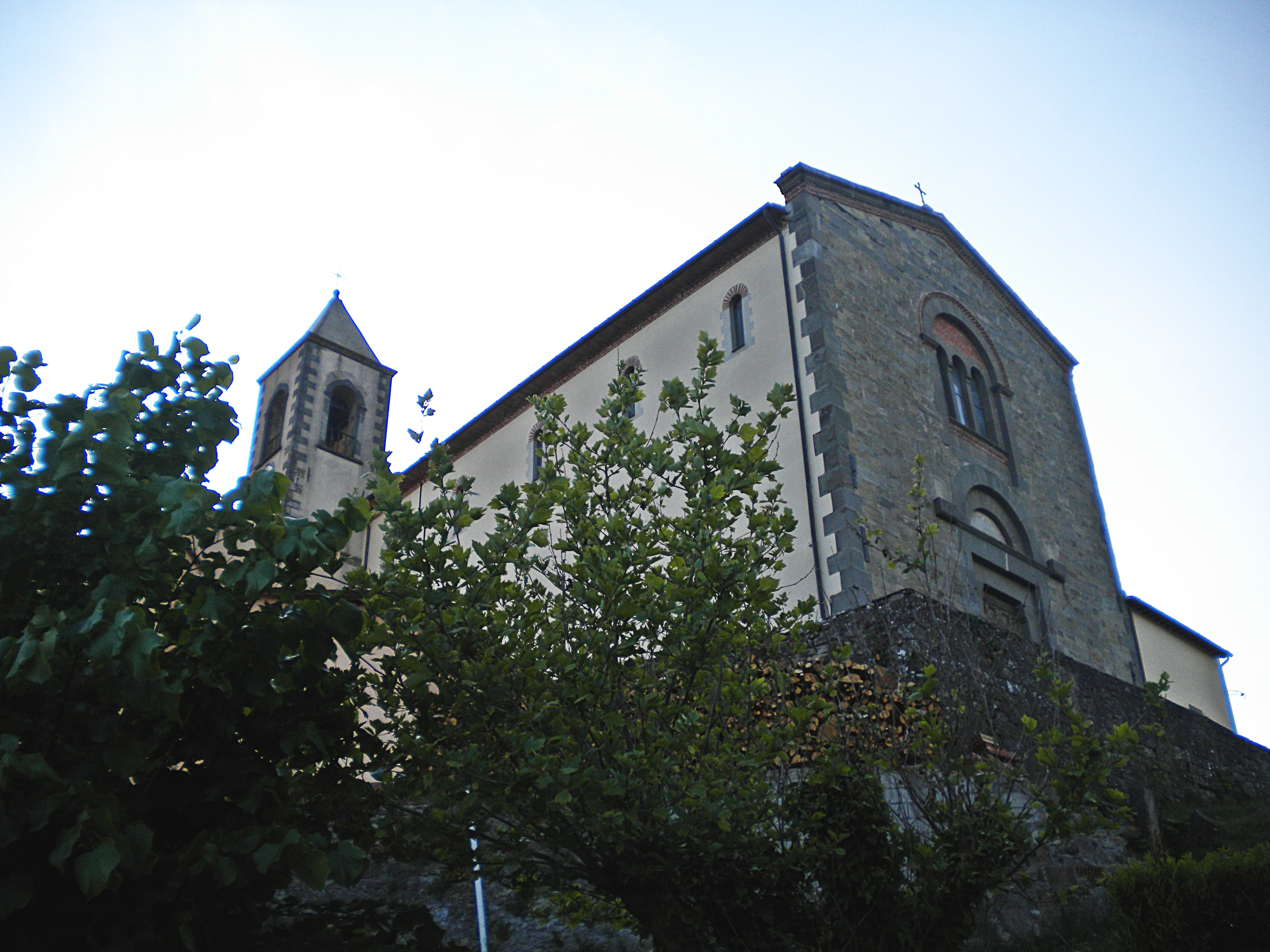
San Pietro church

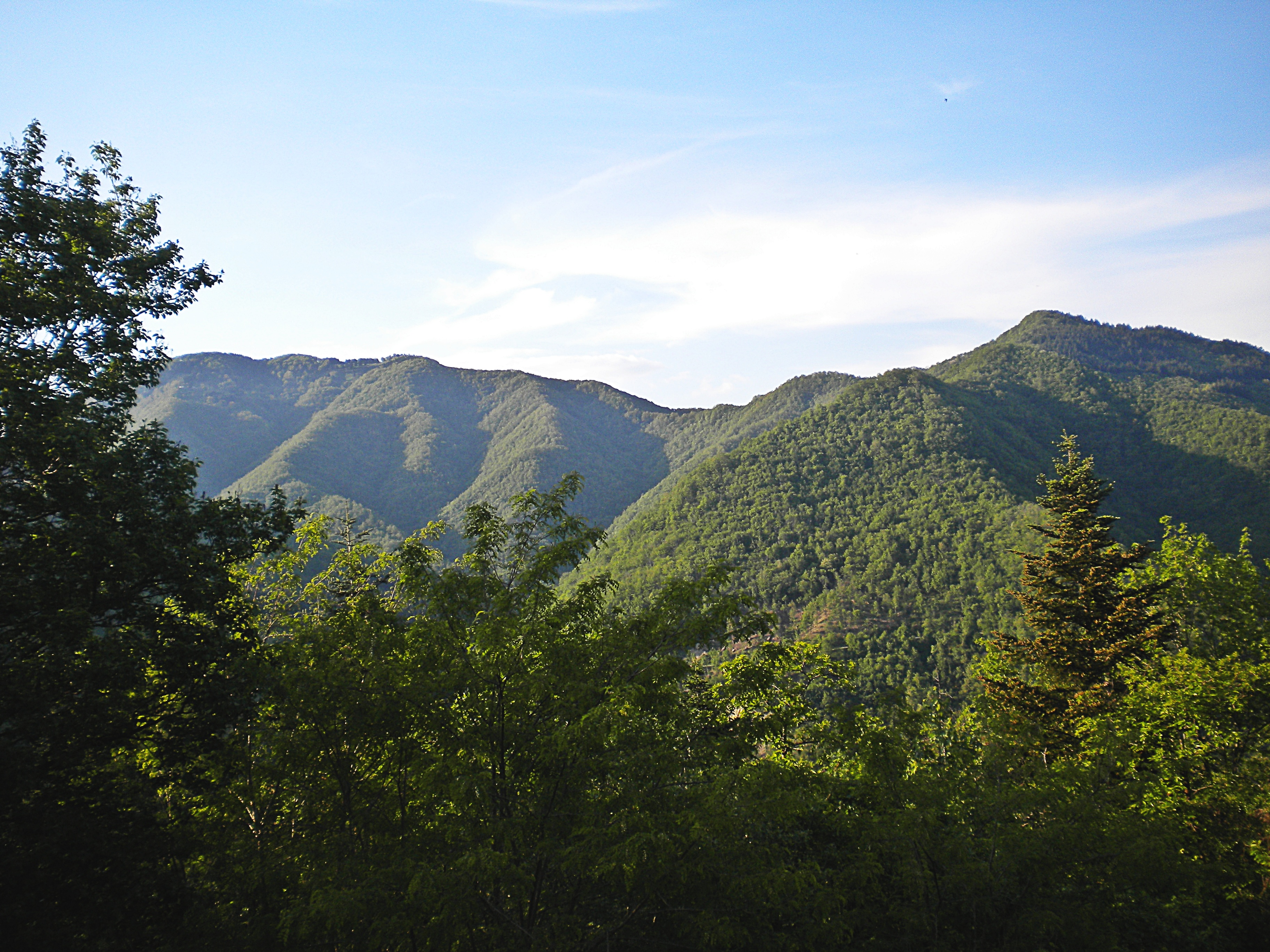
Cavarzano Alpes

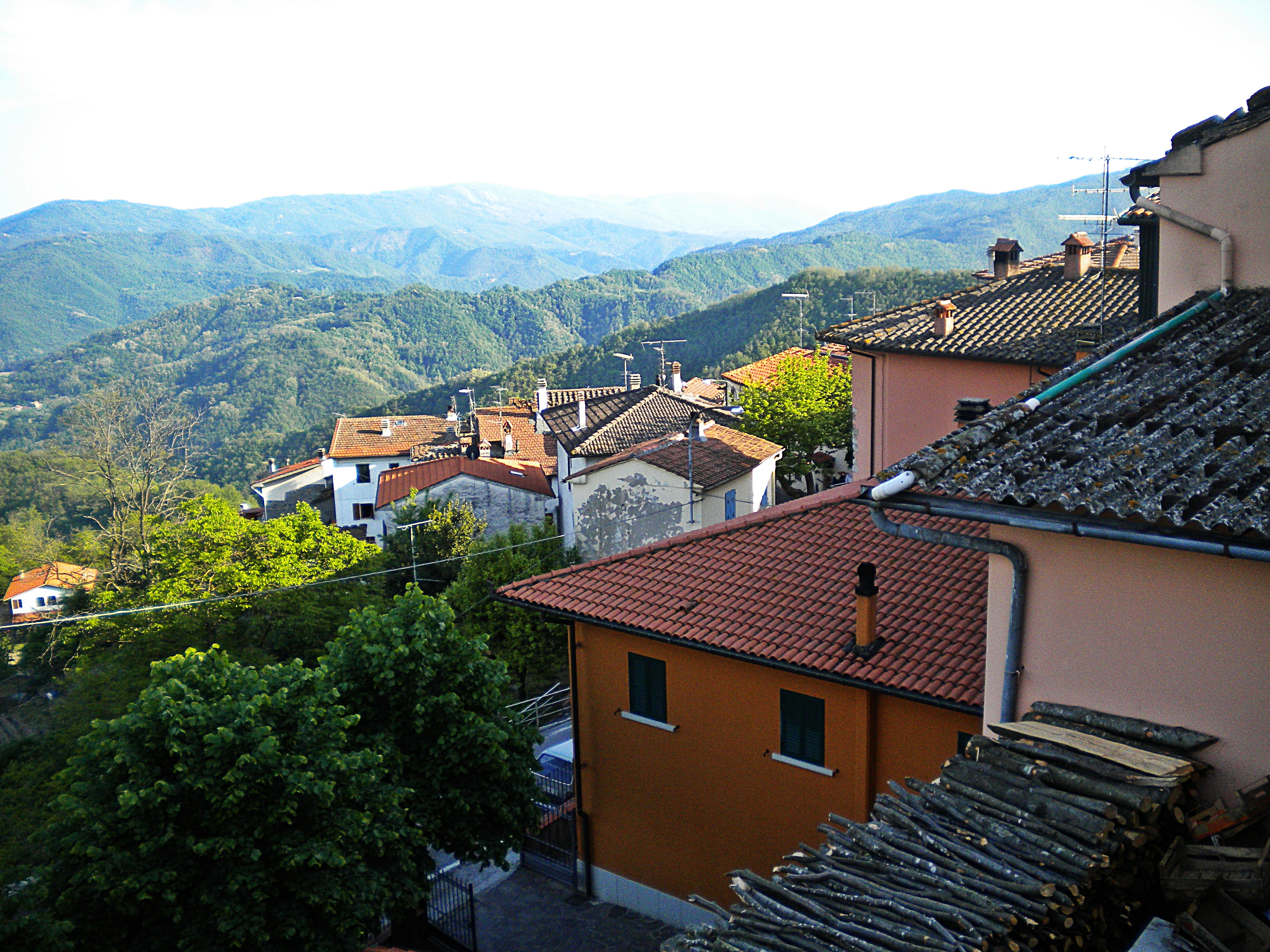
Cavarzano

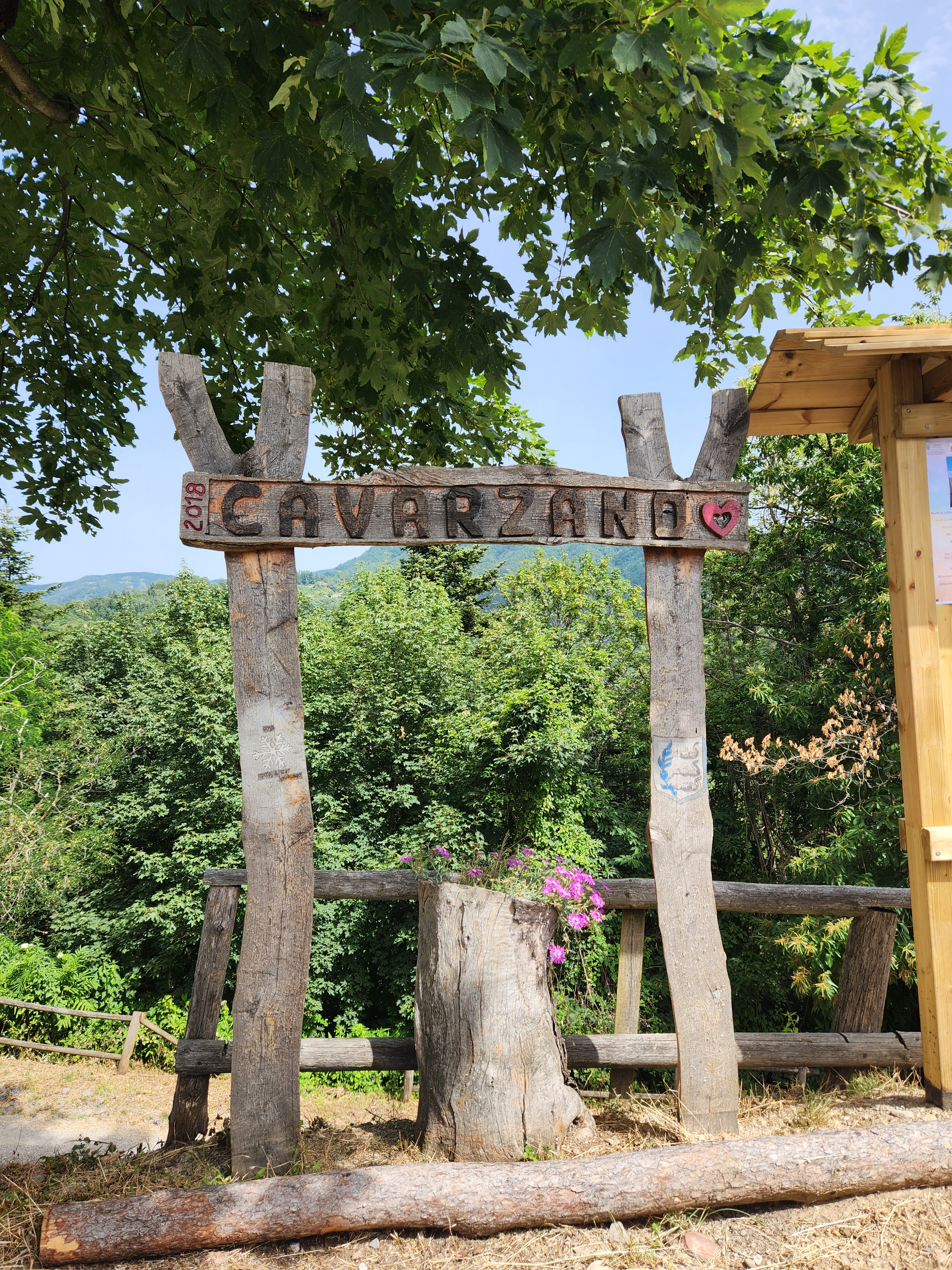
