= Mystical Nativity =

Mystical Nativity may refer to:

- The Mystical Nativity by Sandro Botticelli, 1500-01
- Mystical Nativity (Filippo Lippi) or Adoration in the Forest, by Filippo Lippi, c. 1569
