= Magi Chapel =

Chapel in the Palazzo Medici Riccardi, Florence

The Magi Chapel is a chapel in the Palazzo Medici Riccardi of Florence, Italy. Its walls are almost entirely covered by a famous cycle of frescoes by the Renaissance master Benozzo Gozzoli, painted around 1459 for the Medici family, the effective rulers of Florence.

== Overview ==
The chapel is on the piano nobile of the palace and was one of the first rooms to be decorated after the completion of the building, designed by Michelozzo. In its original appearance the chapel was perfectly symmetrical and had its entrance through the central door. Inside, the chapel is divided into two juxtaposed squares: a large hall and a raised rectangular apse with an altar and two small lateral sacristies. Begun around 1449–50, the chapel was probably completed around 1459 with the precious ceiling of inlaid wood, painted and generously gilded by Pagno di Lapo Portigiano, according to Michelozzo's design. The latter also designed the flooring of marble mosaic work divided by elaborate geometric design, which due to the extraordinary value of the materials (porphyries, granites, etc.) affirmed the Medicis' desire to emulate the magnificence of the Roman basilicas and the Florentine Baptistry.

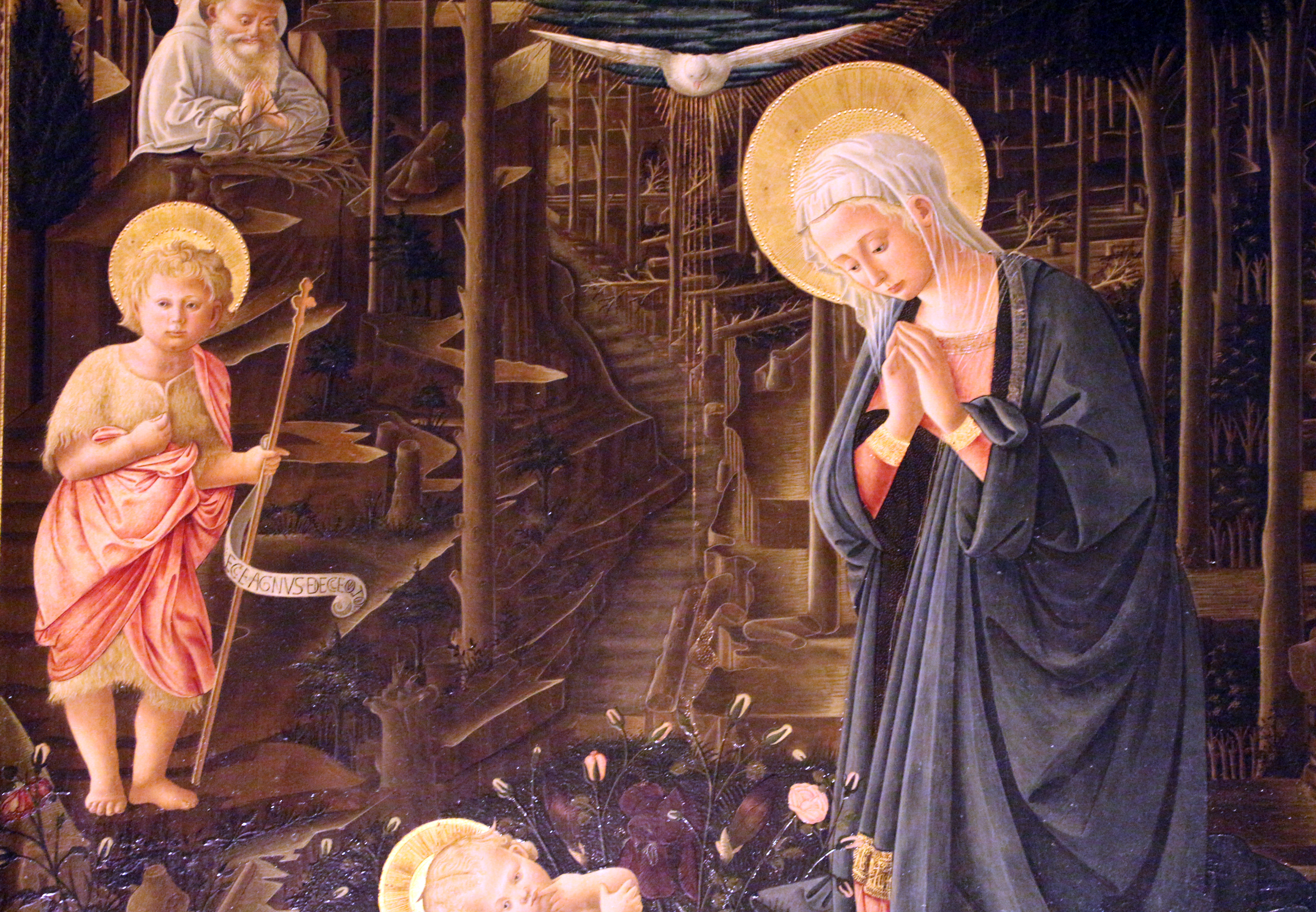
Fiorentino's Adoration (after Lippi).

The first pictorial element in the chapel was the altar panel bearing Filippo Lippi's Adoration in the Forest. This painting is now in Berlin after being sold in the 19th century, while a copy by a follower of Lippi remains in the chapel.

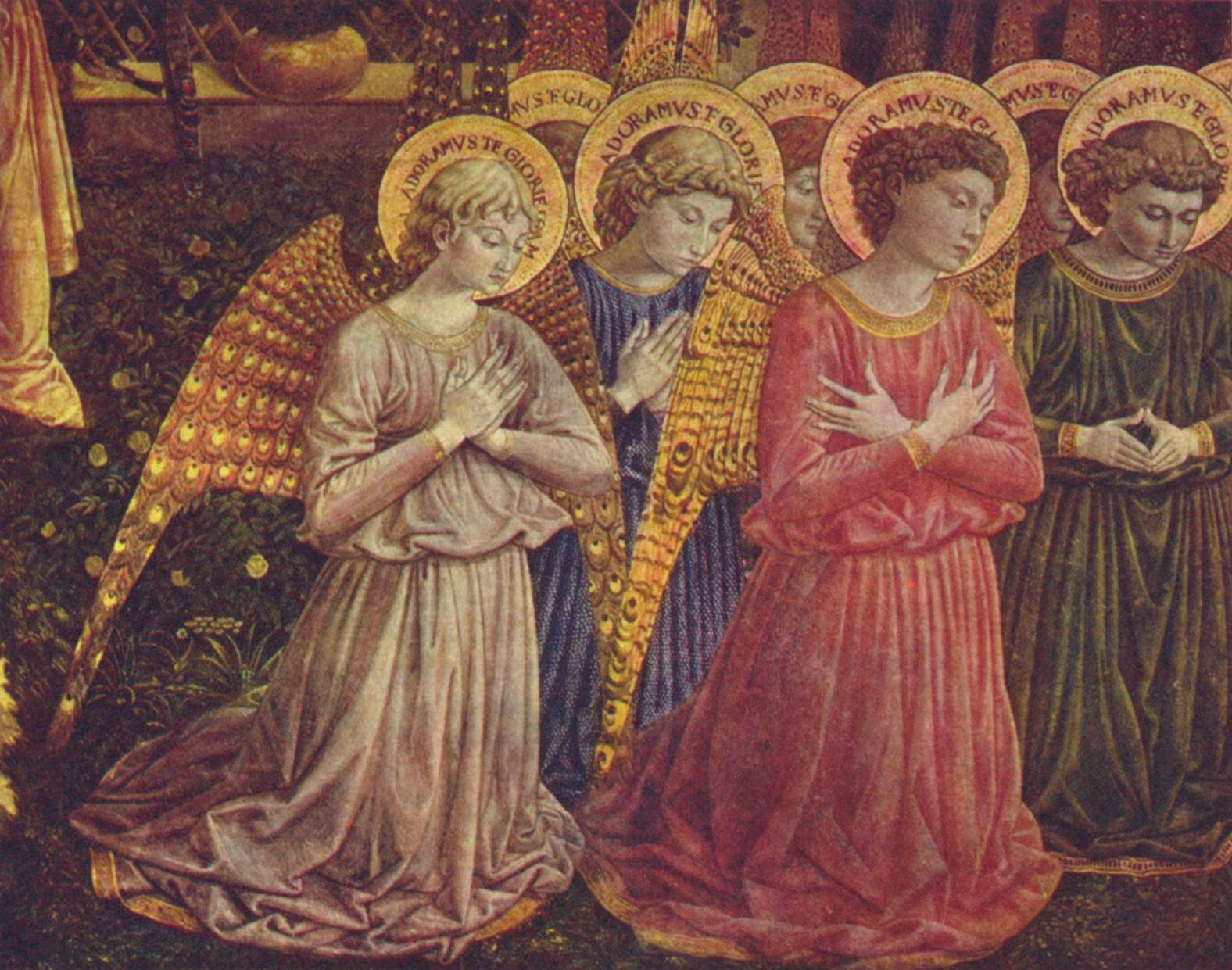
Apse, Detail of the choir of angels.

The chapel is famous for the series of wall paintings by Benozzo Gozzoli, with the Angels in Adoration in the rectangular apse and the Journey of the Magi in the large hall. The latter is covered in three large frescos, each showing the procession of one of the Three Magi on their way to Bethlehem to see the Nativity of Jesus. The religious theme was combined with a depiction of several members of the Medici family, their allies and some of the important figures who arrived in Florence for the Council of Florence (1438–1439) several decades earlier. On that occasion the Medici could boast to have facilitated the (abortive, as it turned out) reconciliation between the Catholic and the Eastern Orthodox churches. The luxury of the Byzantine dignitaries is manifest, and shows the impression they would have at the time on the Florentine population.

In the apse, the side walls are painted with saints and angels in adoration, where Gozzoli followed the style of his master, Fra Angelico. There are also three thin vertical fresco sections showing the shepherds of the nativity.

== Journey of the Magi ==
Journey of the Magi
- East Wall
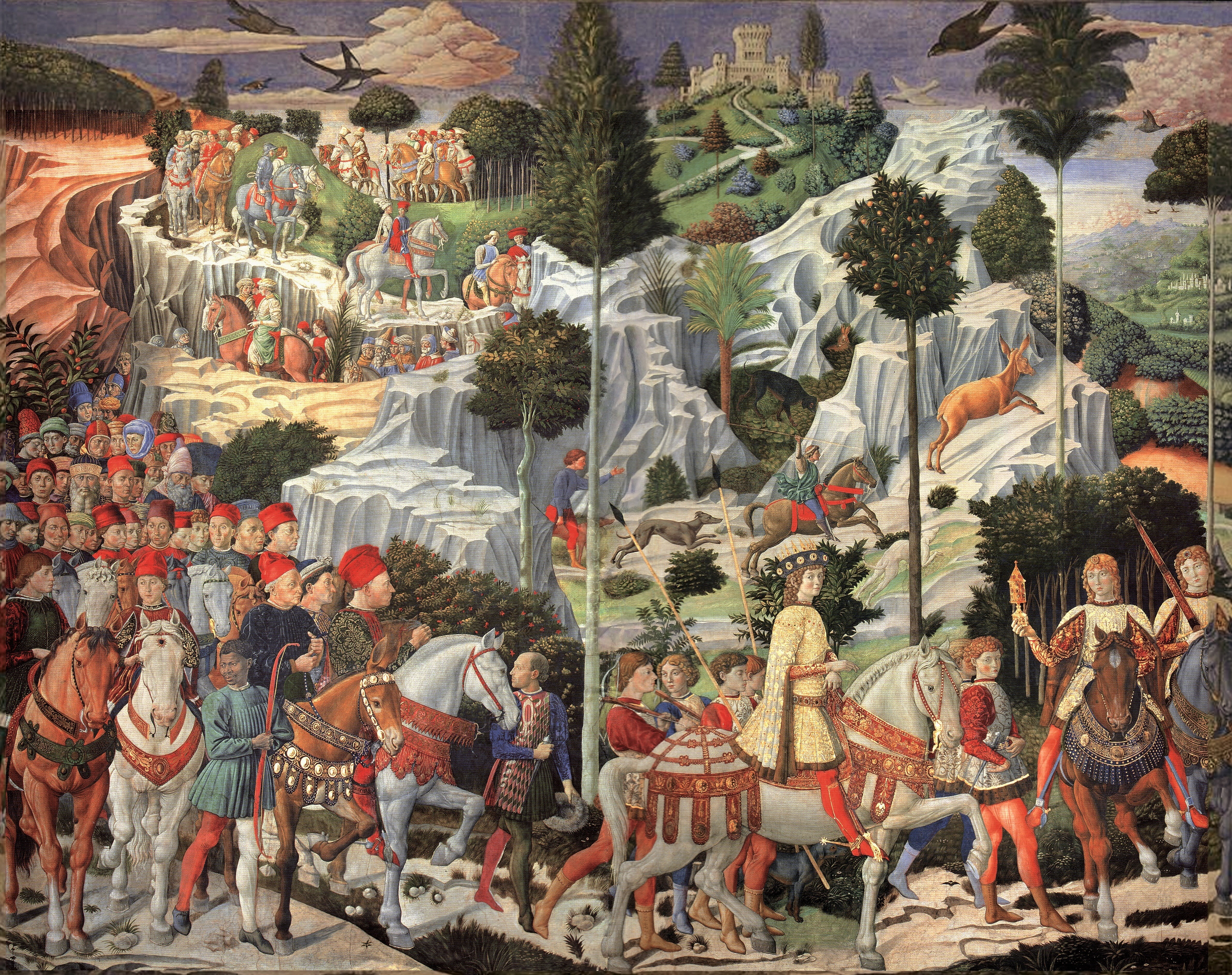
- Artist: Benozzo Gozzoli
- Year: 15th century
- Medium: fresco, fresco-secco
- Dimensions: 405 cm (159 in) × 516 cm (203 in)
- Location: 43°46′30″N 11°15′21″E

=== Background ===
Having begun the work in the spring-summer of 1459, Benozzo probably completed the work rapidly over the space of a few months, with the help of at least one assistant, under the supervision of Piero di Cosimo de' Medici. It was probably Piero who suggested that the artist should use Gentile da Fabriano's Adoration of the Magi as a model for the frescoes. The extraordinary complexity and subtlety of the technique of execution, in which true fresco alternated with dry fresco, permitted the painter to work with meticulous care, almost as if he was engraving, like the goldsmith he had been in Ghiberti's workshop. This sheer craftsmanship is evident not just in the precious materials of jewelry, fabrics, and harnesses, but even in the trees laden with fruit, the meadows spangled with flowers, the variegated plumage of the birds, and the multicolored wings of the angels. Finally, leaves of pure gold were applied generously to shine in the dark, in the dim light of the candles.

The painting combines religious imagery with detailed secular elements. Angels are depicted singing and adoring while the procession of the Three Kings approaches Bethlehem, accompanied by their respective entourages as they take part in the scene of a noble hunting party with falcons and felines along the way. The work features detailed representation of varied contemporary costumes and textiles, providing a notable historic record of Renaissance.

=== The procession ===
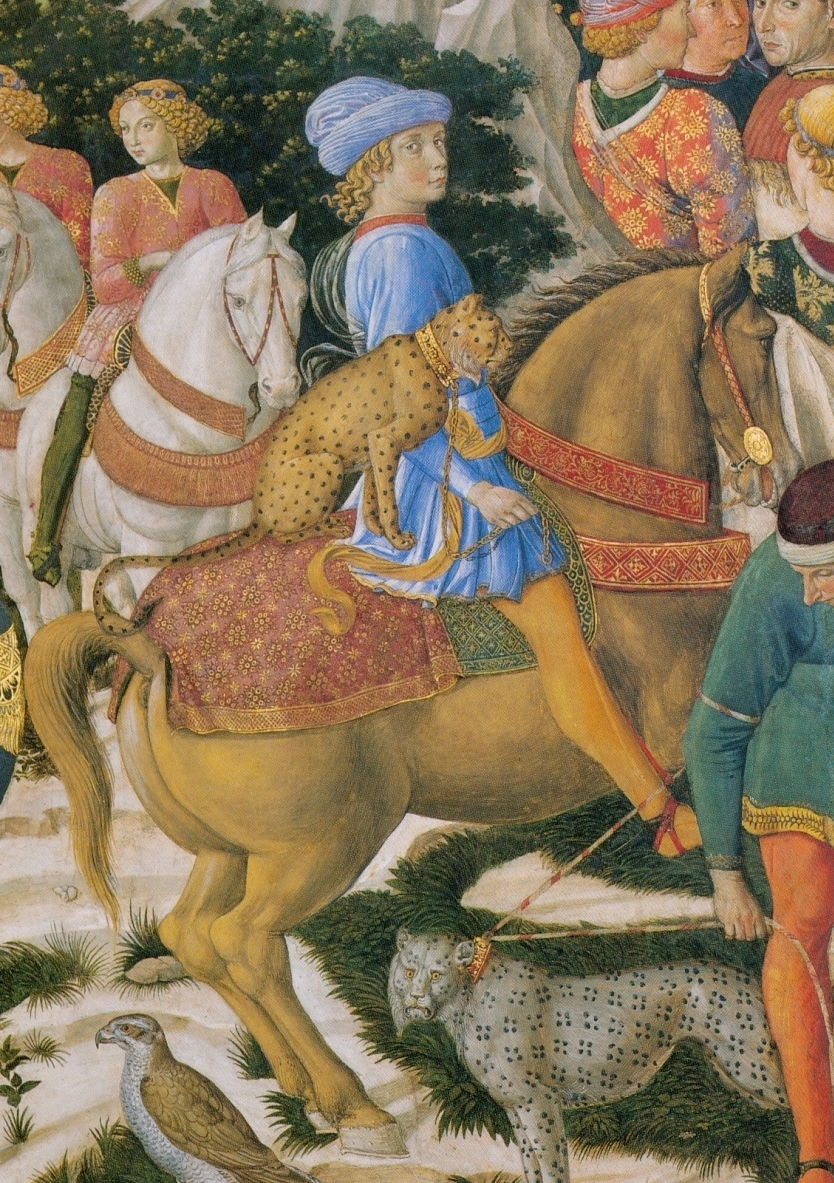
West Wall, Castruccio Castracani with a cheetah, the symbol of his house.

Melchior, the oldest Magus, rides on the west wall leading the procession. Traditionally, his features have been read as those of Joseph, Patriarch of Constantinople, who died in Florence during the Council; but they could also be those of Sigismund, Holy Roman Emperor, who helped end the Great Schism by convoking the Council of Constance in 1414. Like Cosimo, he is shown as a peacemaker riding on a donkey. He is preceded by a page in blue with a leopard on his horse - this figure is a scherzo, a joke embedded in a painting, representing Castruccio Castracani, Duca di Lucca, according to C.F. Young’s “The Medici”, with the leopard being the sign of the house of Lucca. Giuliano de' Medici is shown riding a white horse, preceded by an African with a bow.

Bearded Balthasar, the middle Magus, rides a white horse on the south wall. He is portrayed with the same facial features as Byzantine emperor John VIII Palaiologos. It is thought by some that the three pages behind him represent Piero's daughters, Nannina, Bianca and Maria, while others argue that the faces of those young women are more likely to be amongst the rest of the Medici portraits.

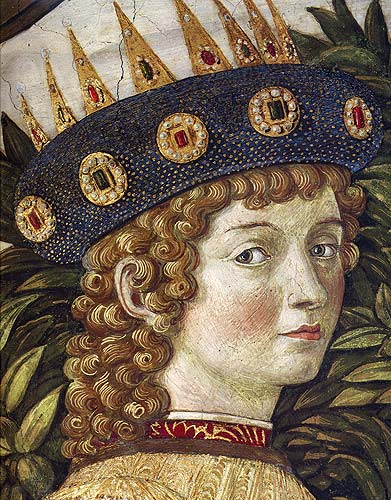
East Wall, Caspar, the youngest Magus - possibly Lorenzo the Magnificent or Demetrios Palaiologos.

On the east wall, Caspar, the youngest Magus, leads the end of the procession on a white horse. This figure has often been taken for an idealized Lorenzo il Magnifico, who was born in 1449 and so was still a boy when the fresco was completed. Closely following Caspar are the contemporary head of the family, Piero the Gouty on a white horse, and devout family founder Cosimo on a humble donkey. Then come Sigismondo Pandolfo Malatesta and Galeazzo Maria Sforza, respectively lord of Rimini and Pavia. They did not take part in the Council, but were guests of the Medici in Florence in the time the frescoes were painted. After them is a procession of illustrious Florentines, such as the humanists Marsilio Ficino and the Pulci brothers, the members of the Art Guilds and Benozzo himself. The painter looks out at the viewer and can be recognized for the scroll on his red hat, reading Opus Benotii. Little Lorenzo il Magnifico is the boy directly below him with the distinctive snub nose; Lorenzo's younger brother Giuliano is next to him.

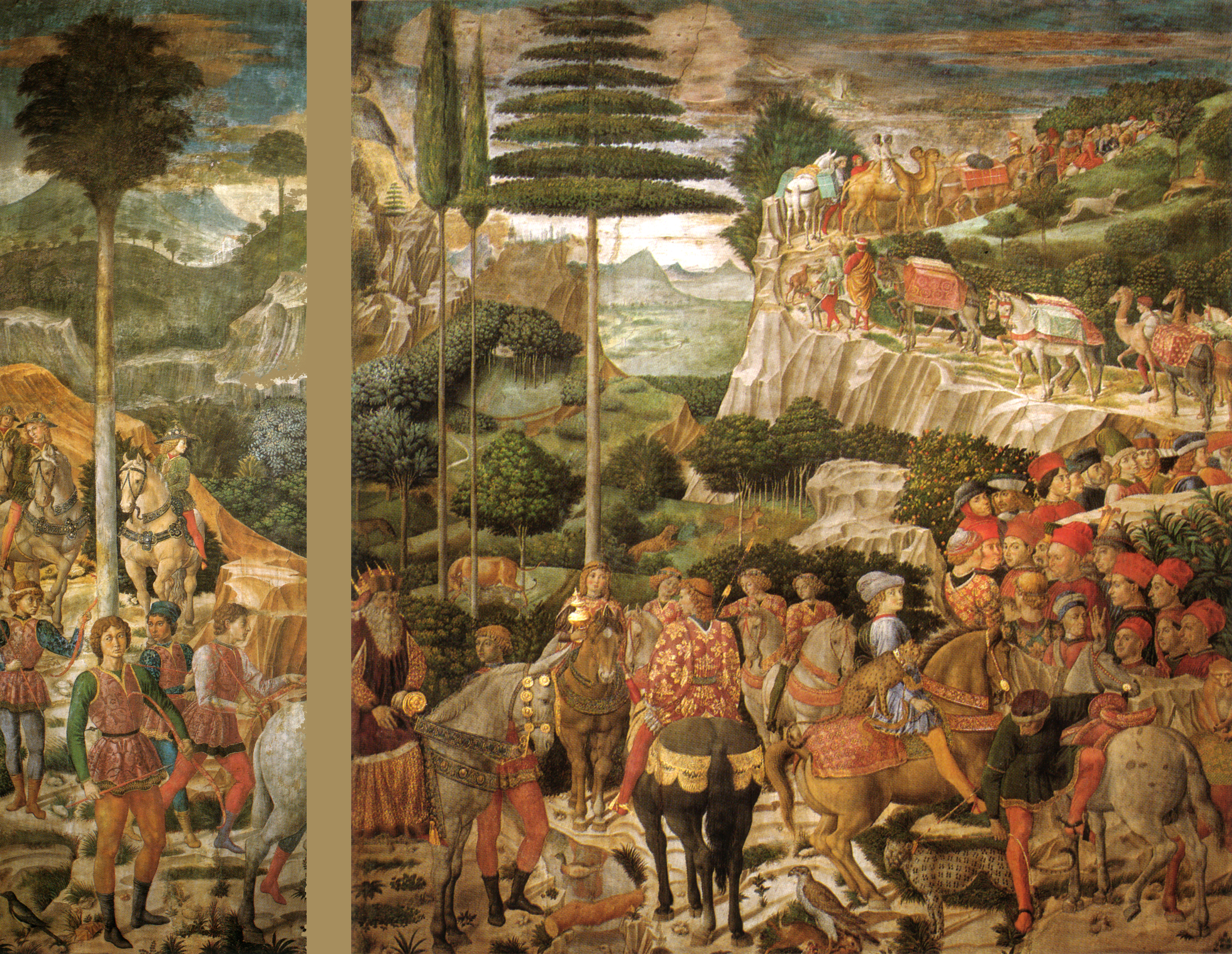
West Wall (cut clearly visible).

With rich Tuscan landscapes filling the rest of the pictorial space, this fresco was designed like contemporary tapestries, a new type of courtly art destined for wealthy patrons. The fortress, in the style of medieval castles, which appears at the highest point of the picture and is the point from which the king's pilgrimage has set out, is similar to the Medicis' country seat in Cafaggiolo, which was again designed by Michelozzo. It is interpreted as Jerusalem, where the procession of the magi started. This was where King Herod had instructed the wise men to search for the child.

Gozzoli's patron, Piero de' Medici, felt some of the seraphim were unsuitable, and wanted them painted over. Although the artist agreed to do this, it was never actually done. In 1659, the Riccardi family bought the Palazzo Medici and undertook some structural changes. This included, in 1689, the building of an exterior flight of stairs leading up to the first floor. For this purpose the entrance to the chapel had to be moved. During the process, two sections of wall were cut out of the south western corner, in the Procession of the Oldest King. After the stairs were finished, the cut out elements were mounted on a corner of the wall projecting into the room. During the course of this, the oldest king's horse was cut up and mounted on two different segments of the wall.

== Gallery ==
Interior

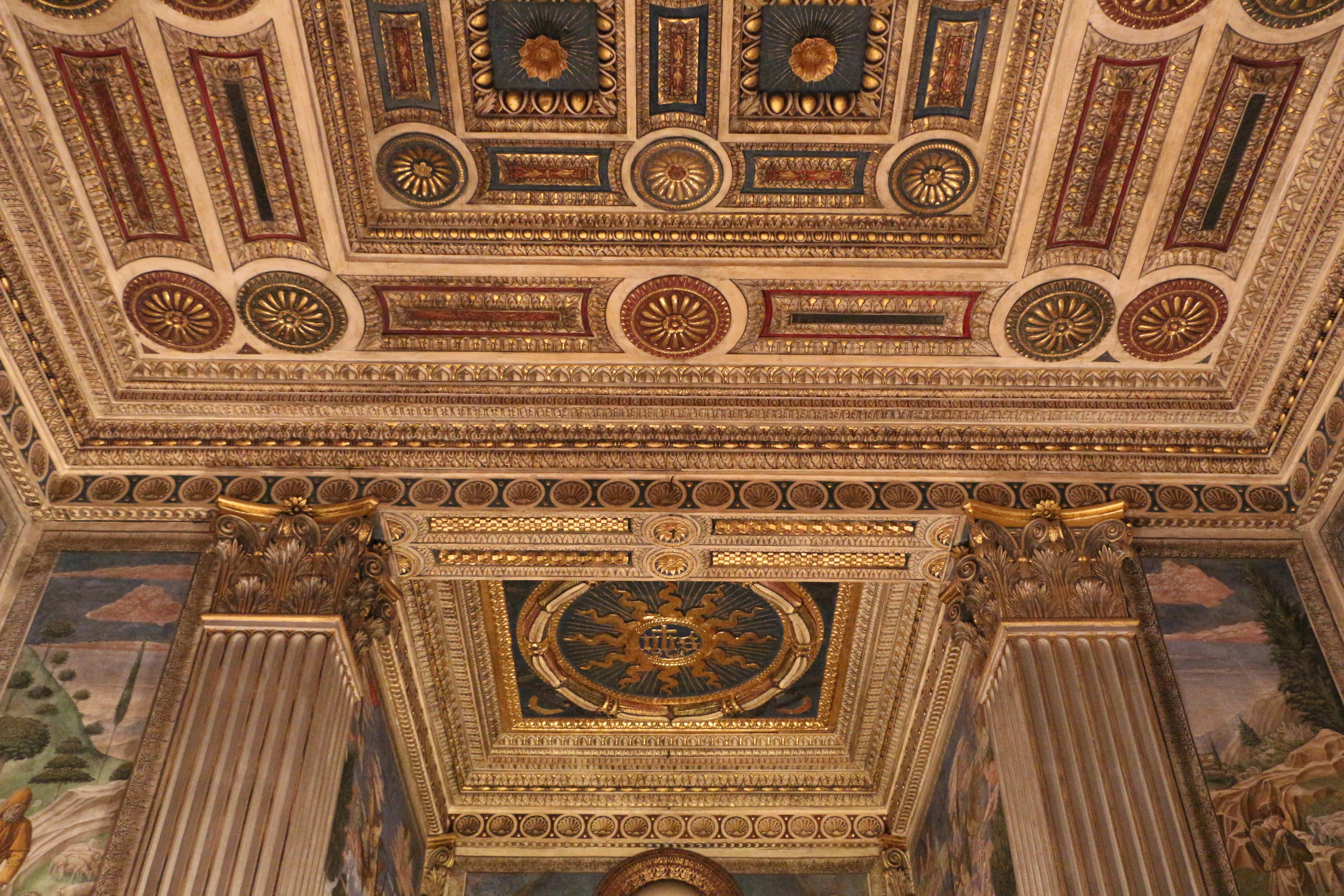
Chapel ceiling

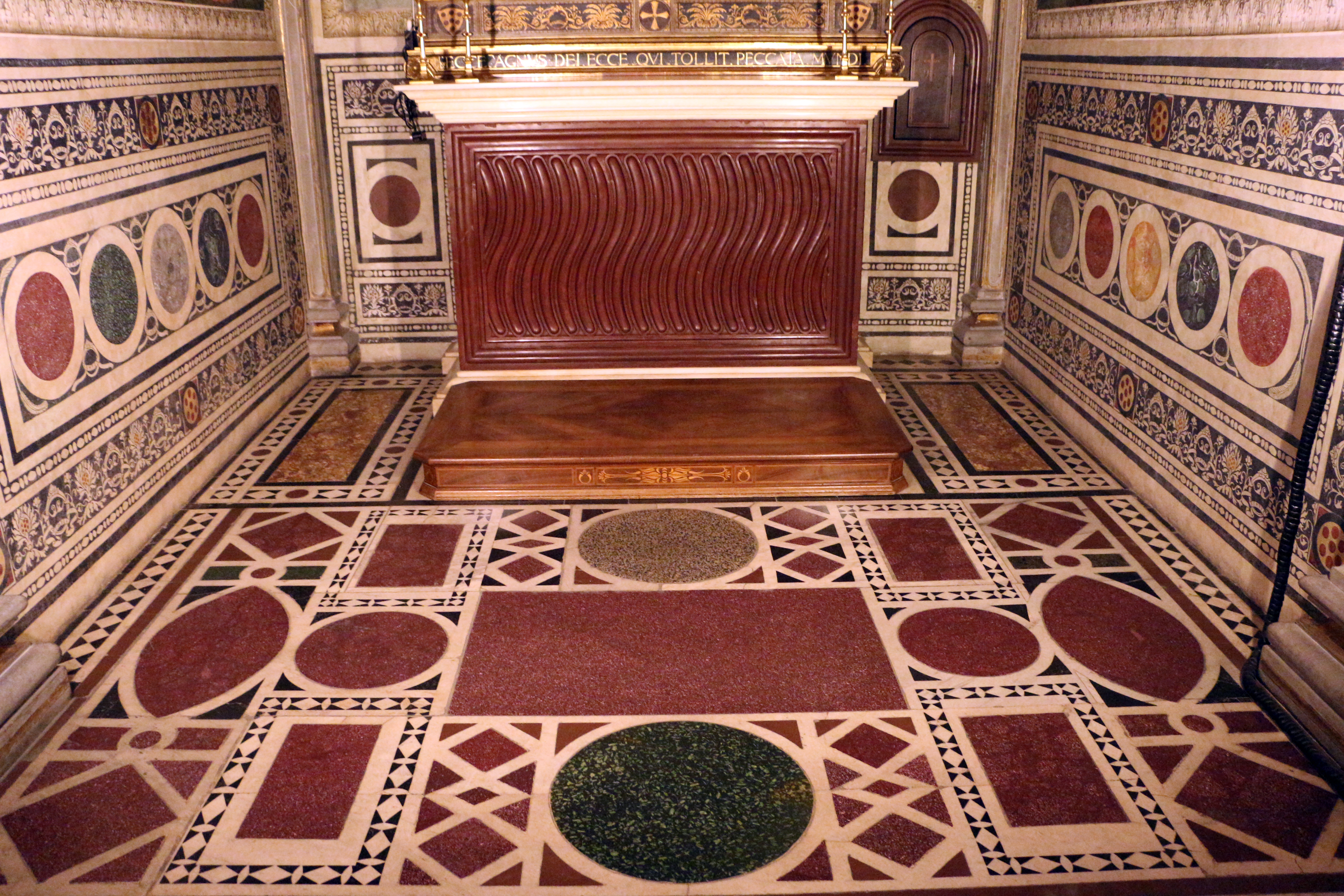
Chapel floor

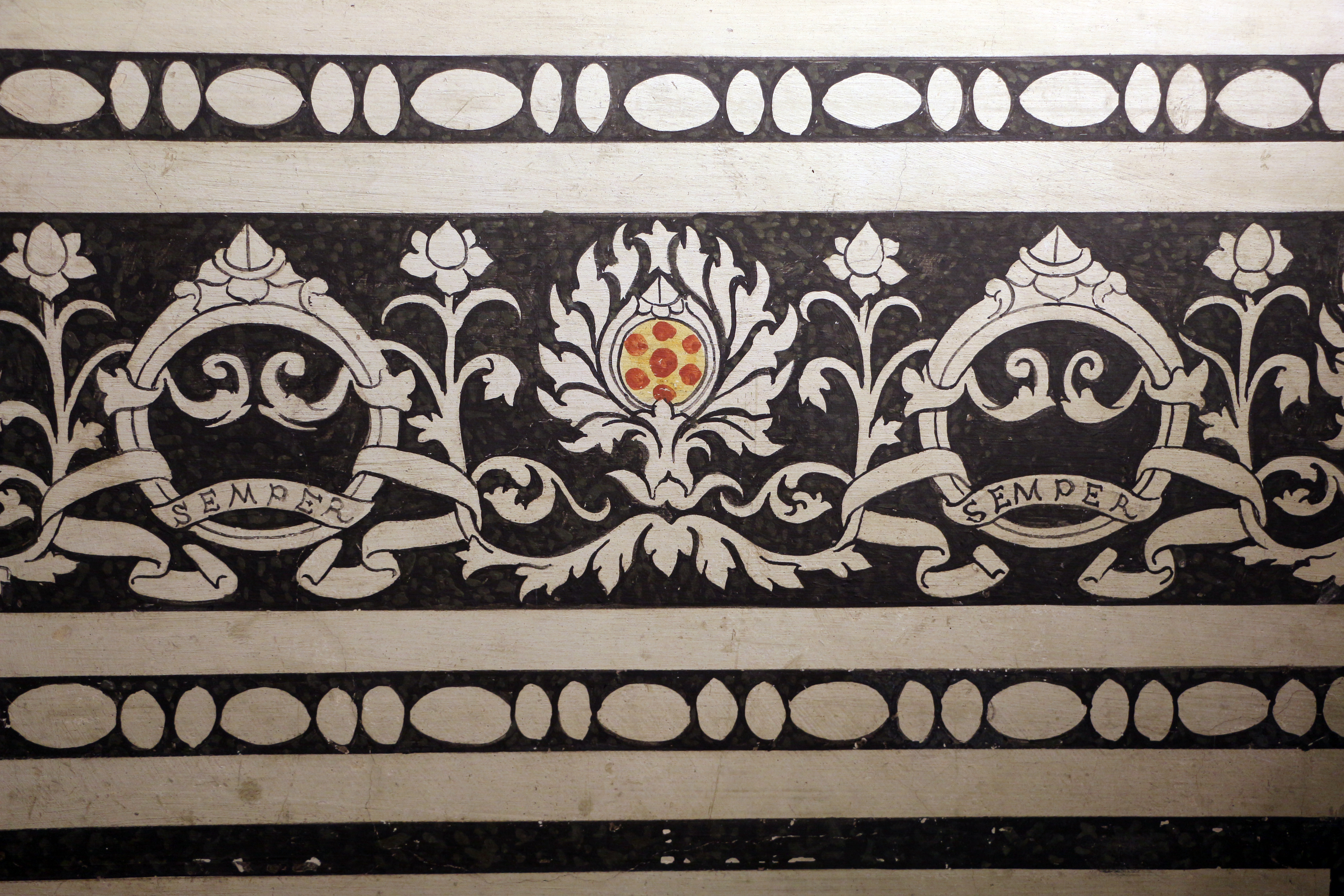
Decorations

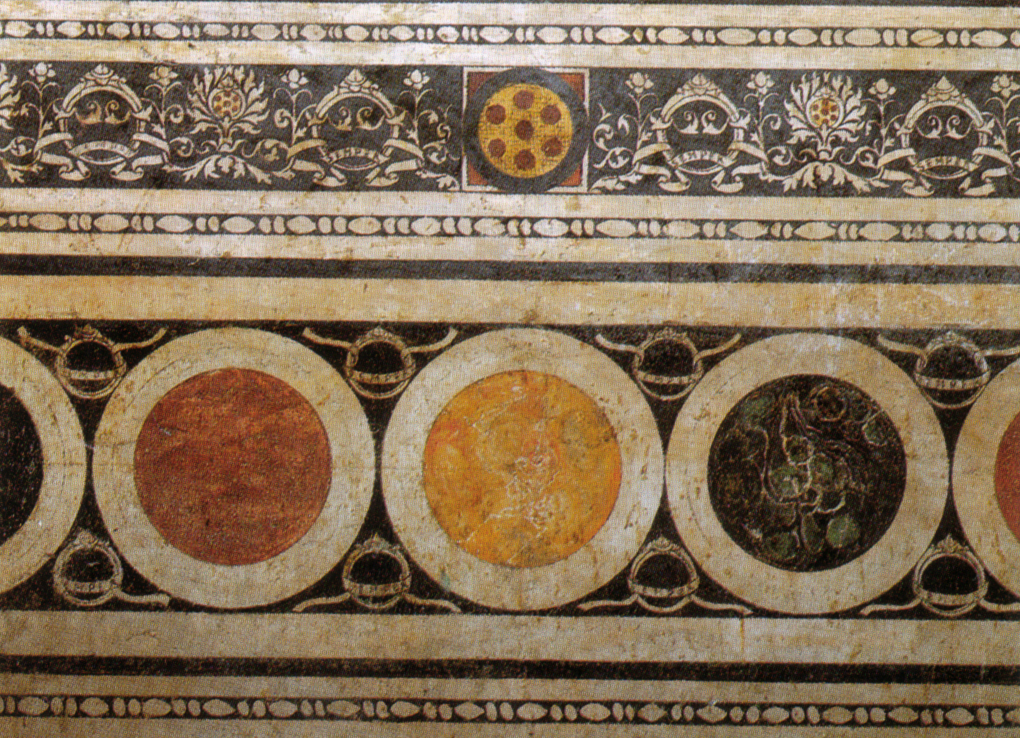
Decorations

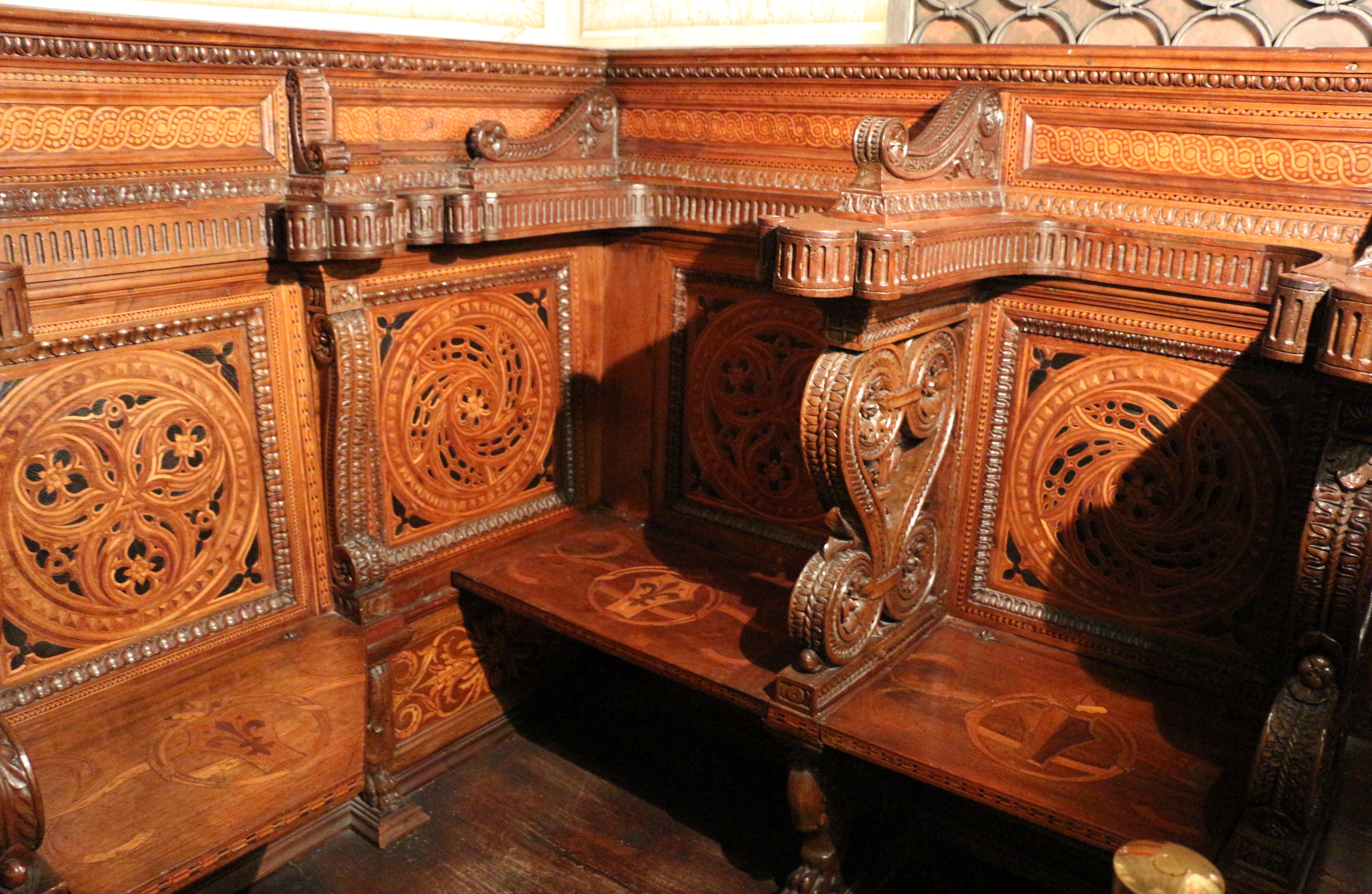
Carved wooden stalls
Apse and altar

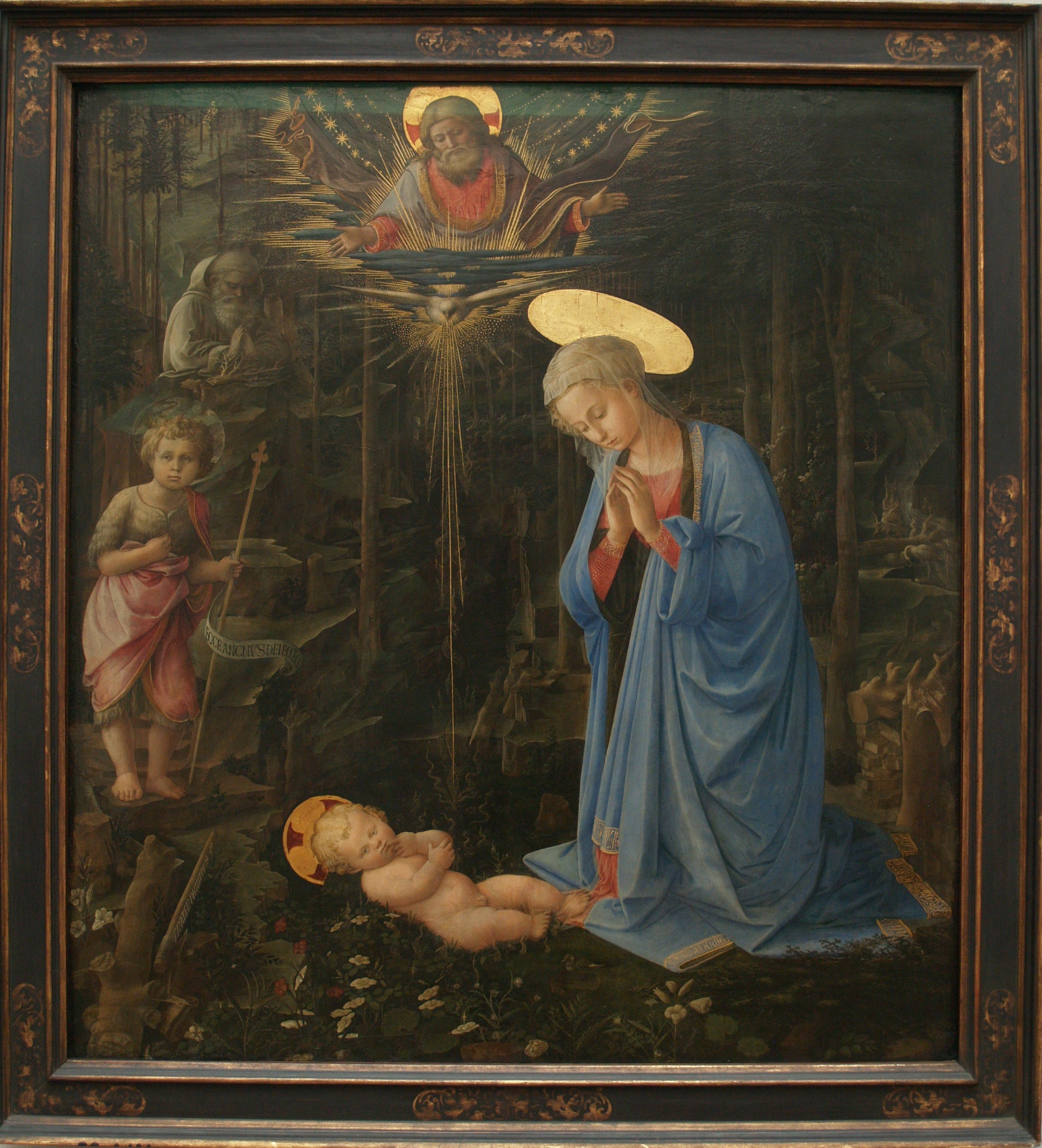
The original altarpiece, Lippi's Adoration

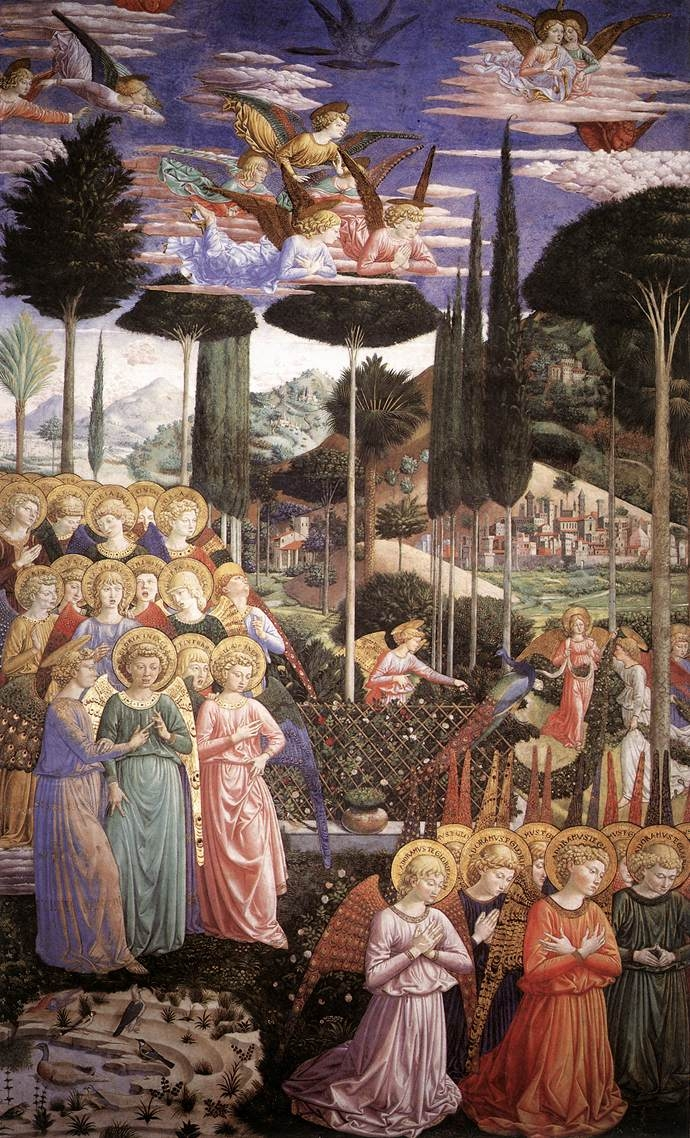
Angels in Adoration (left)

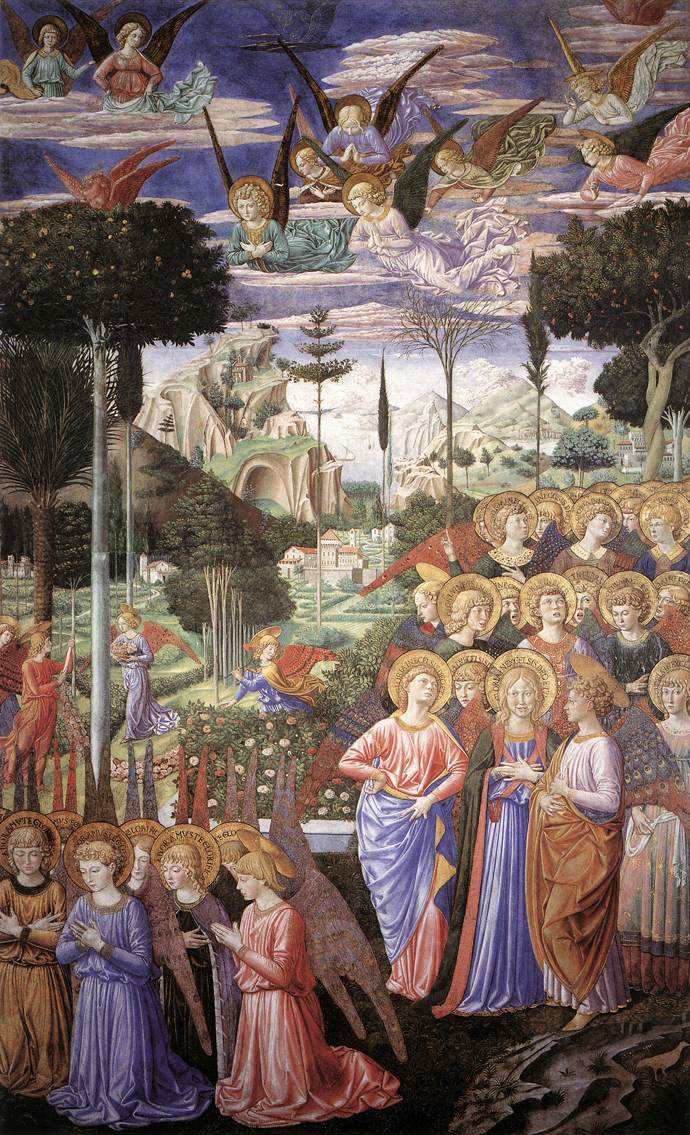
Angels in Adoration (right)
Procession

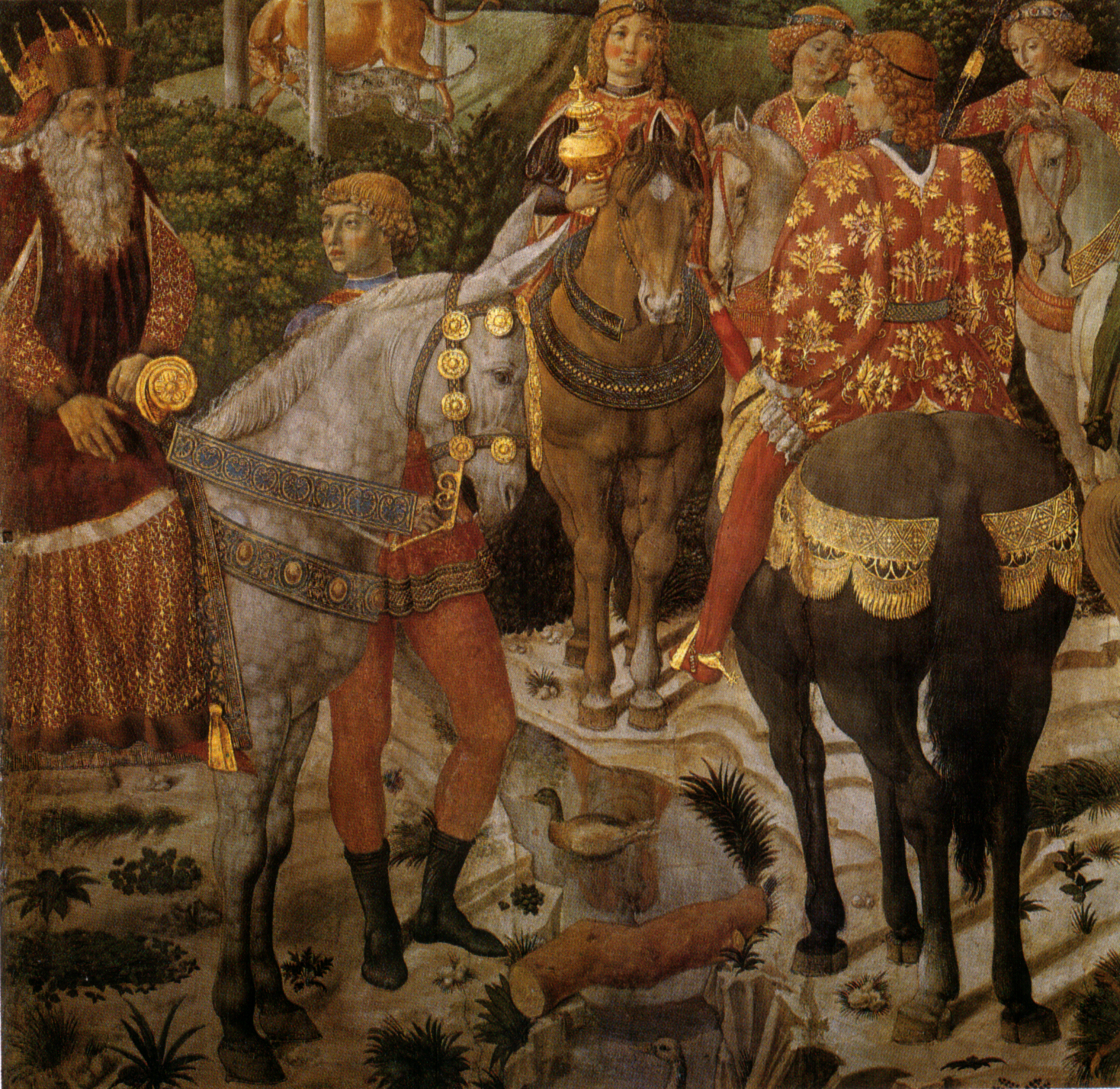
Melchior

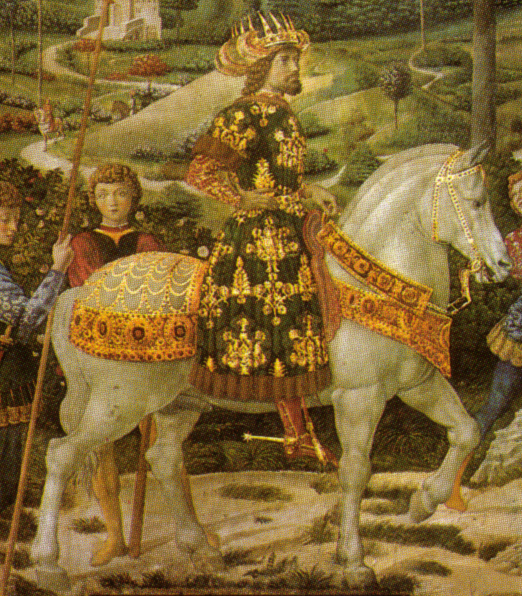
Balthasar

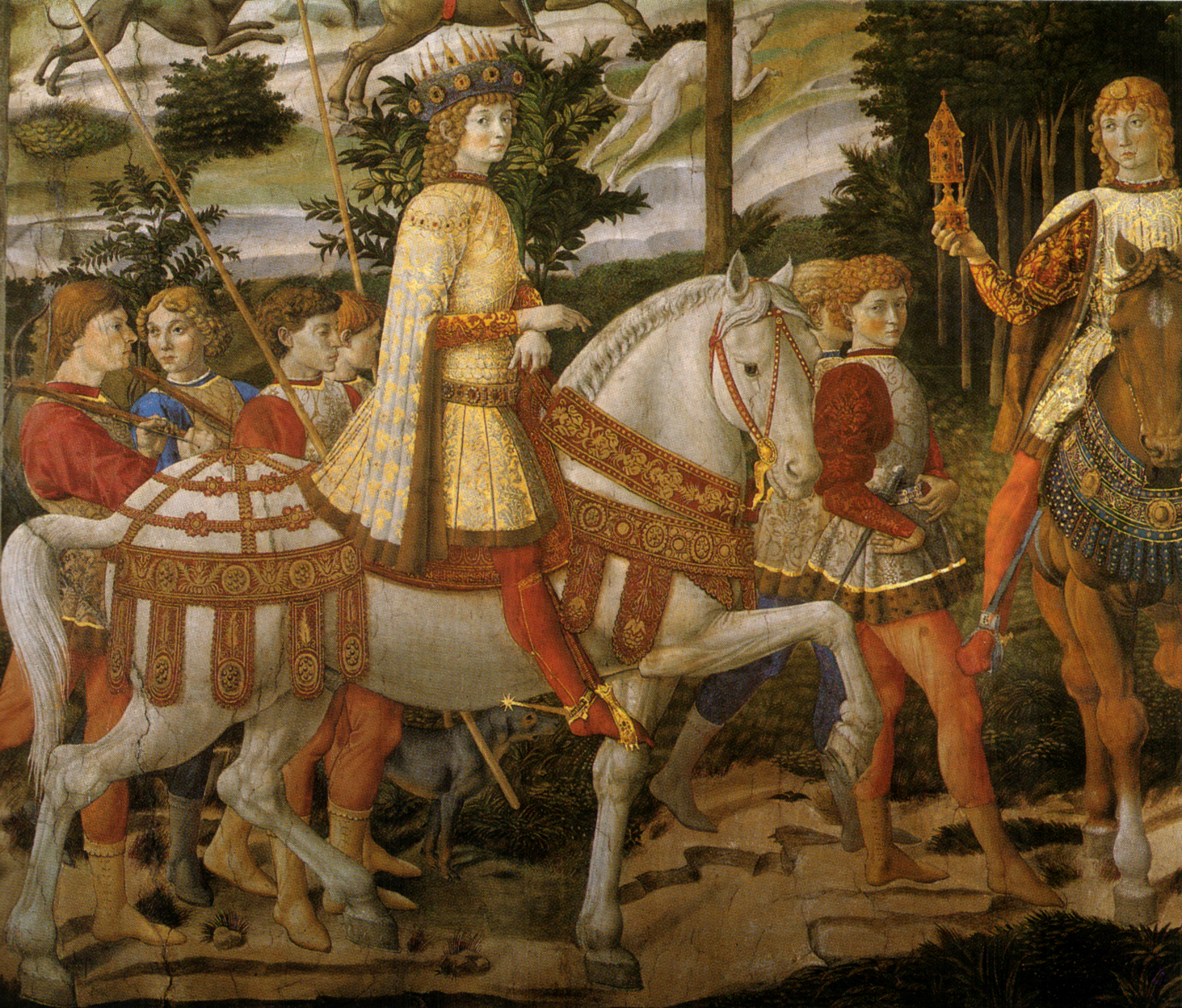
Caspar

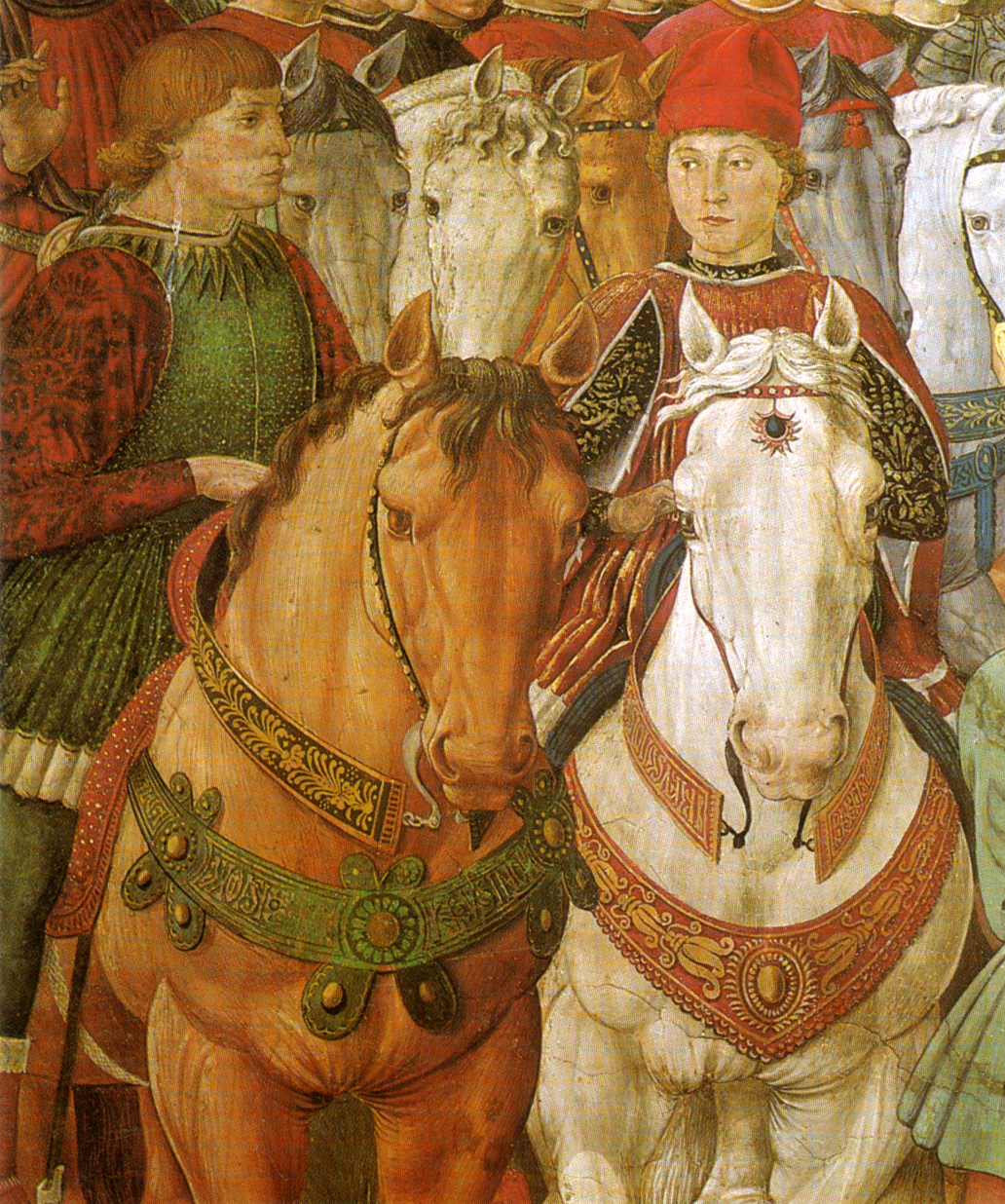
Sigismondo Malatesta and Galeazzo Maria Sforza

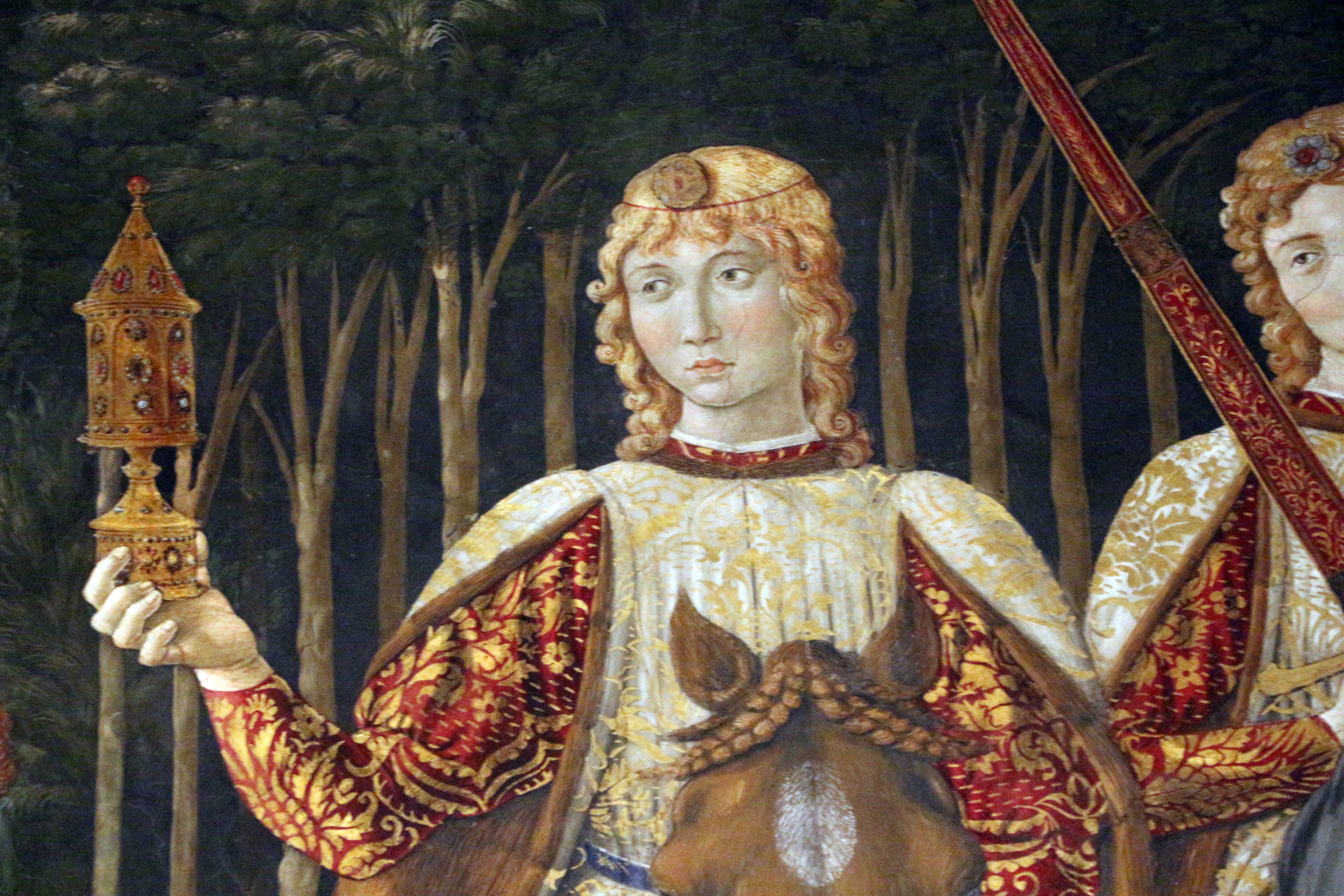
Byzantine wealth
Medici and Gozzoli

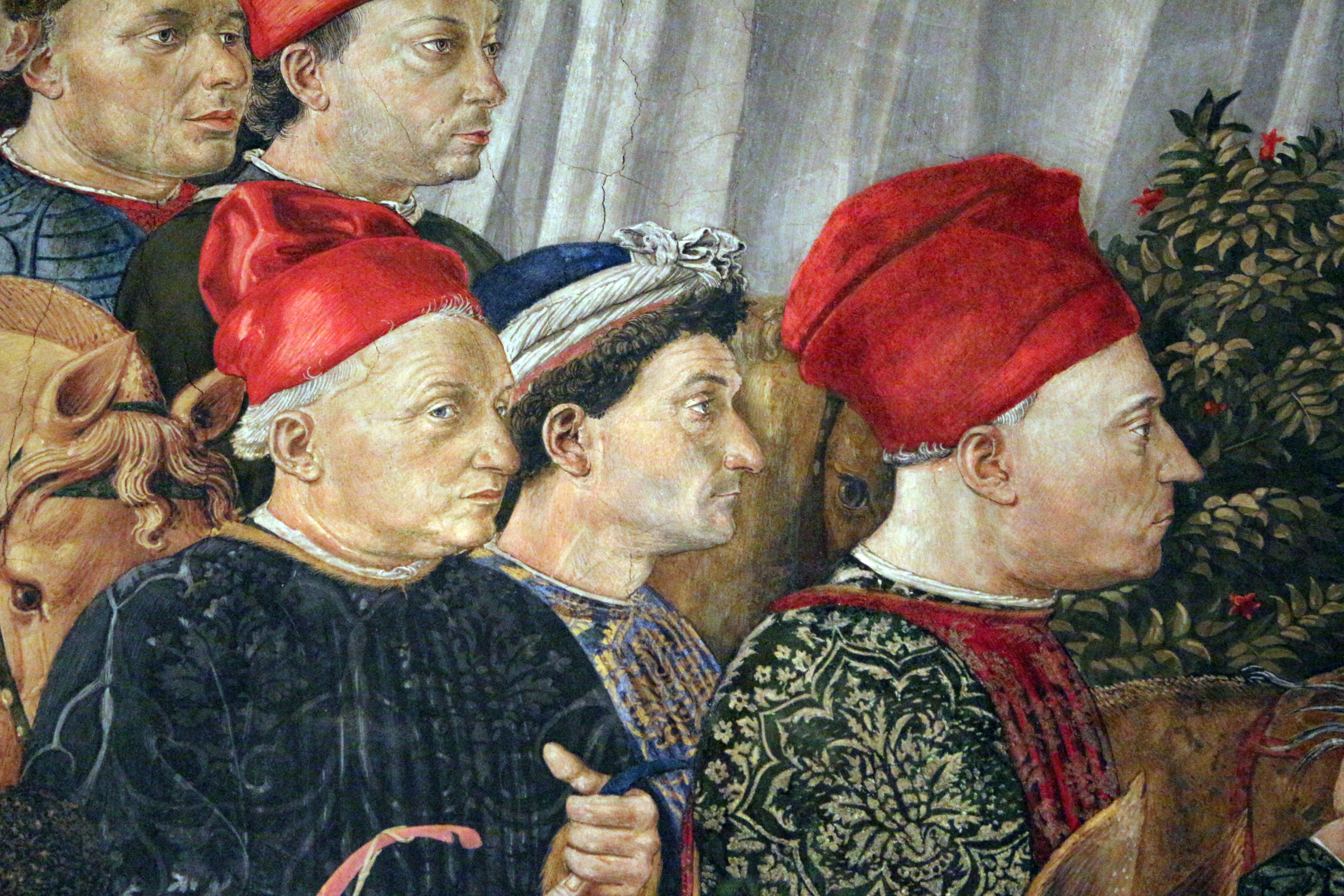
Cosimo and Piero

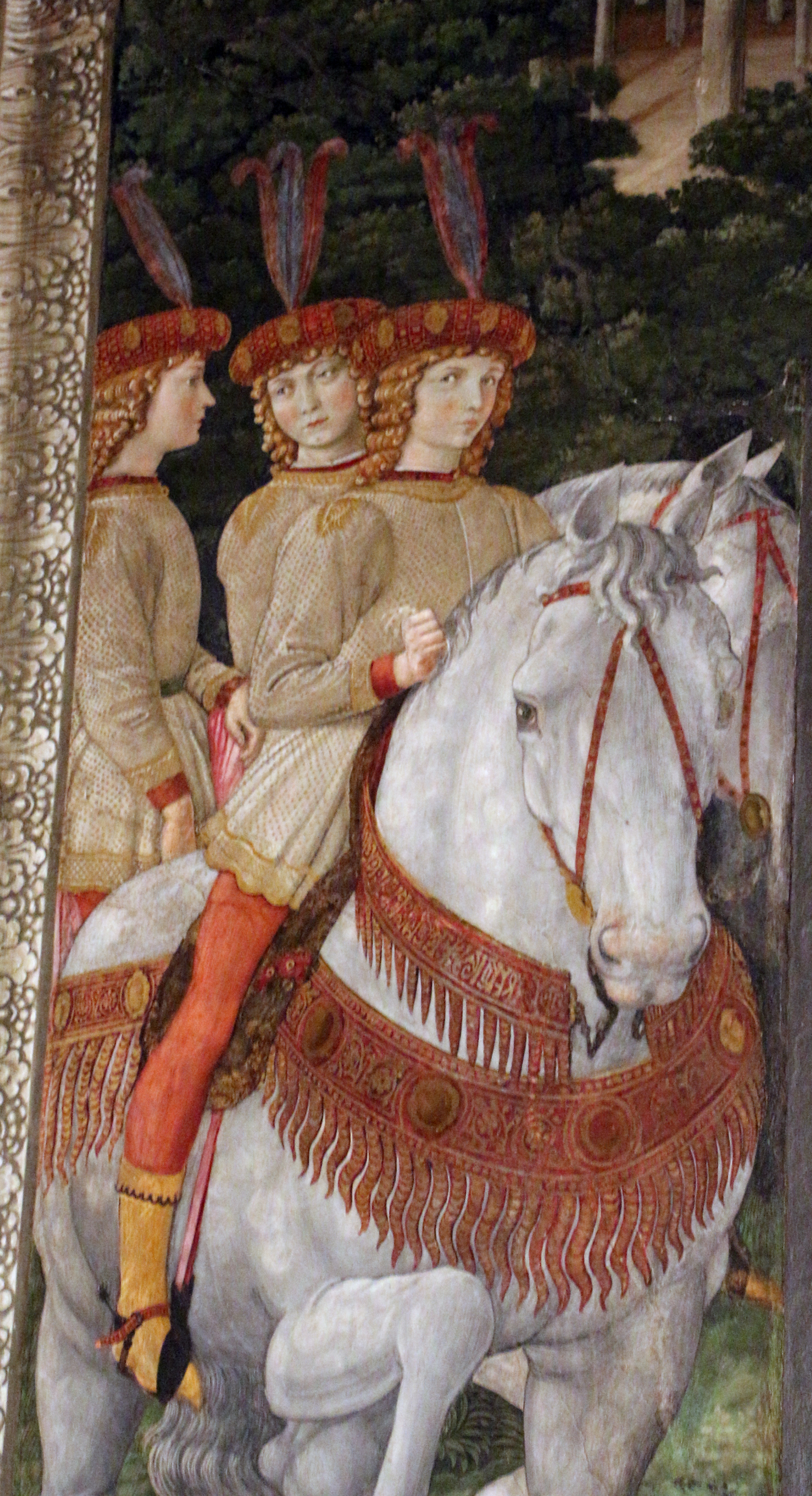
Nannina, Bianca and Maria.

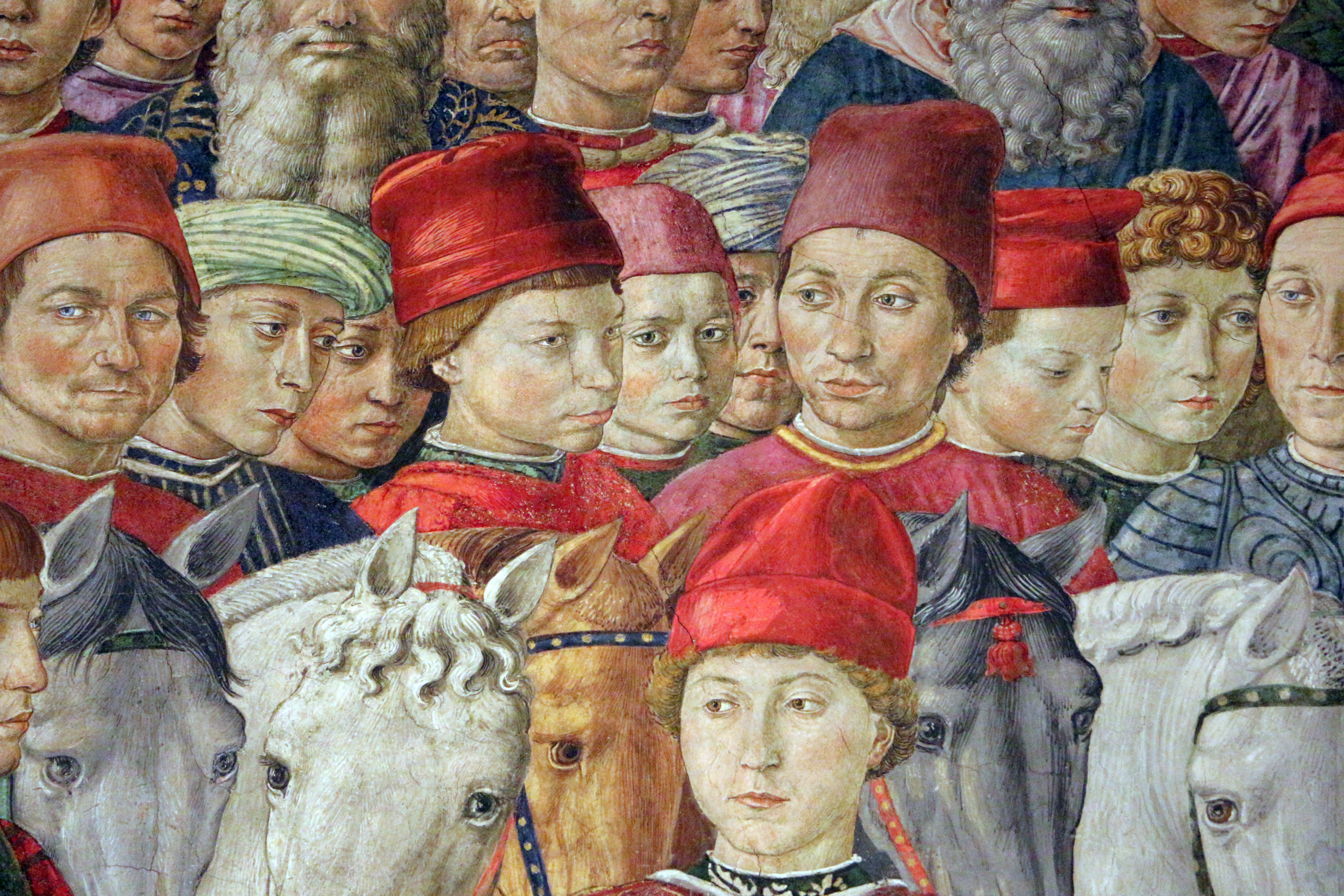
Lorenzo and Giuliano

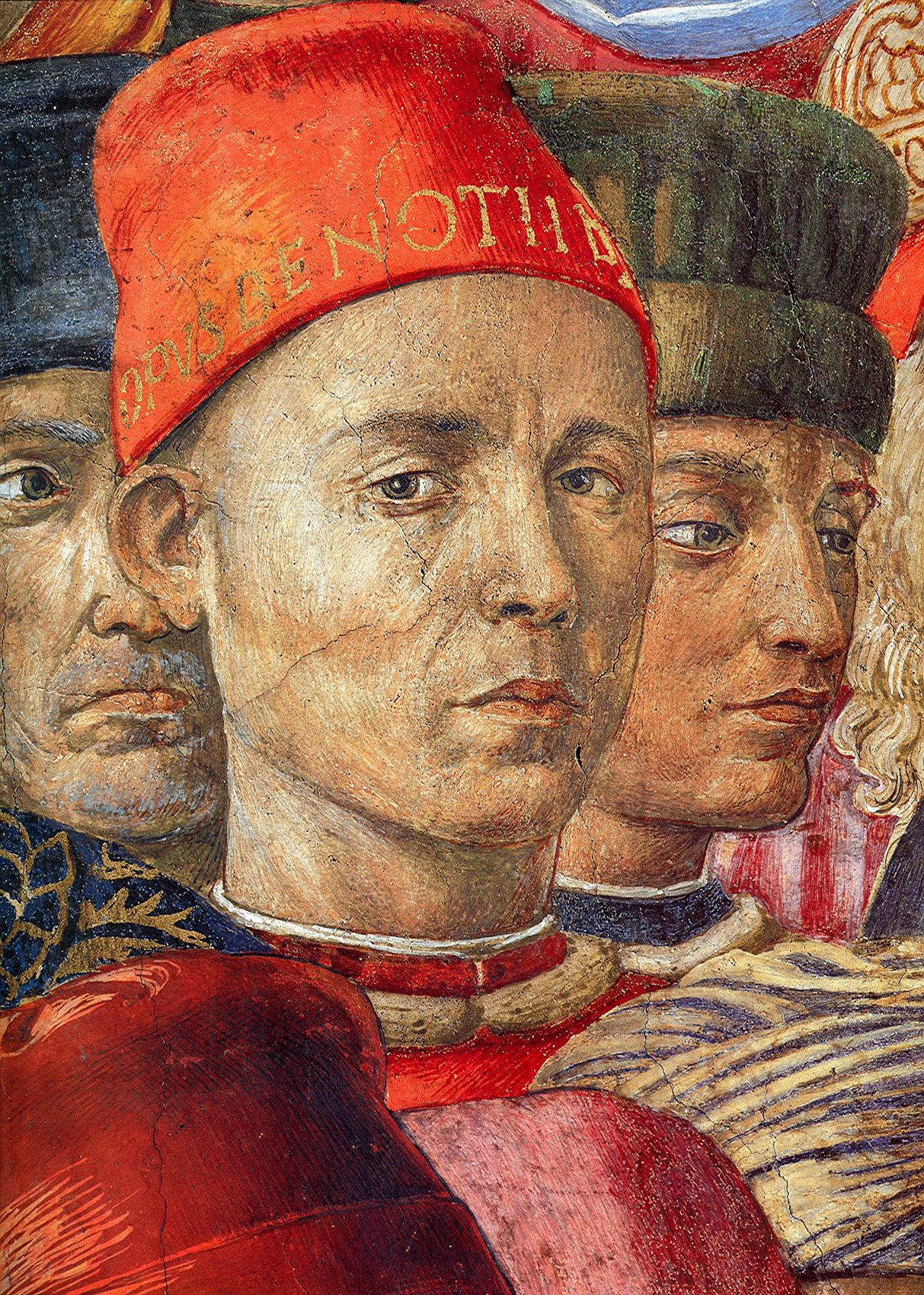
Gozzoli, self-portrait.

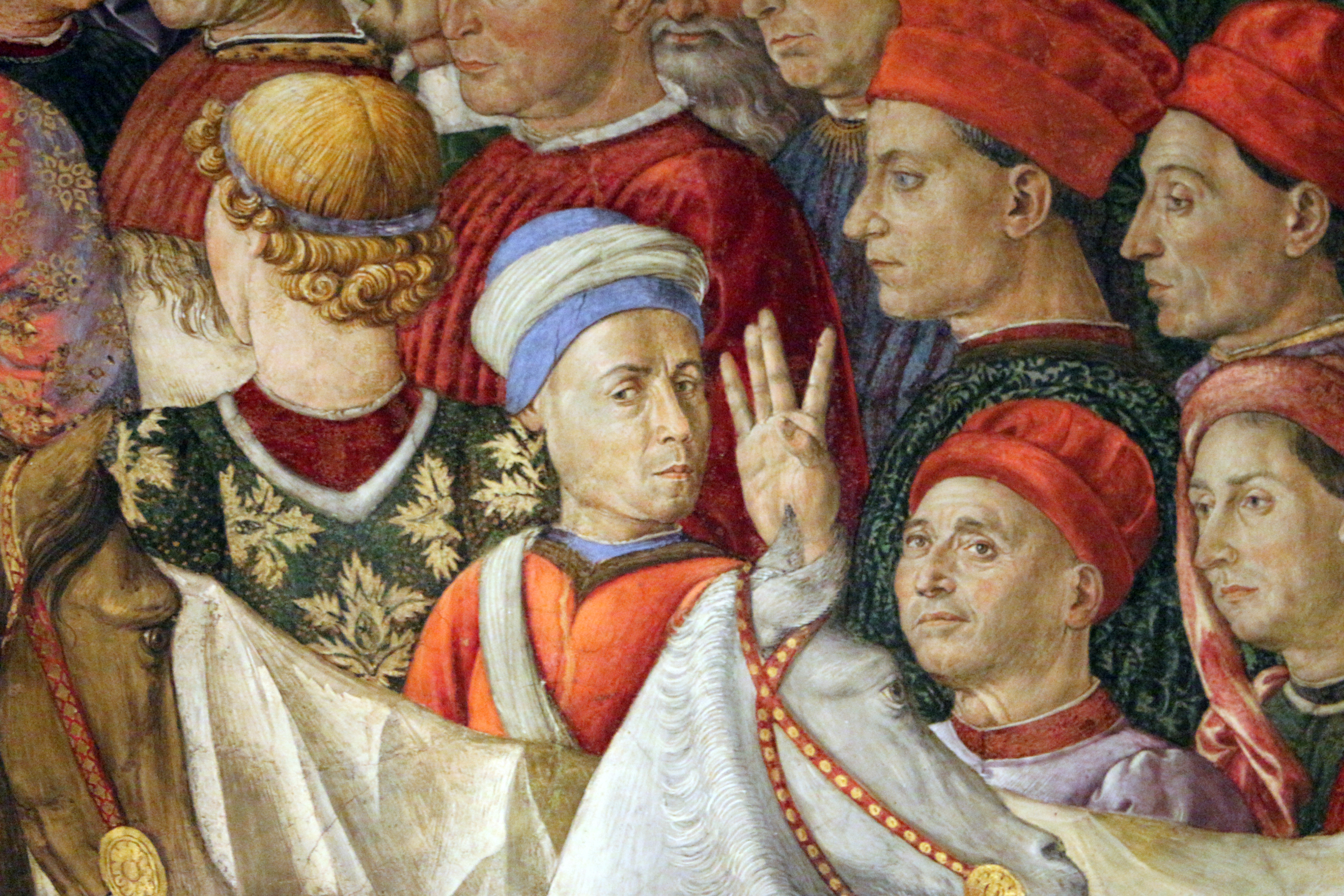
Gozzoli (centre), self-portrait
Nature

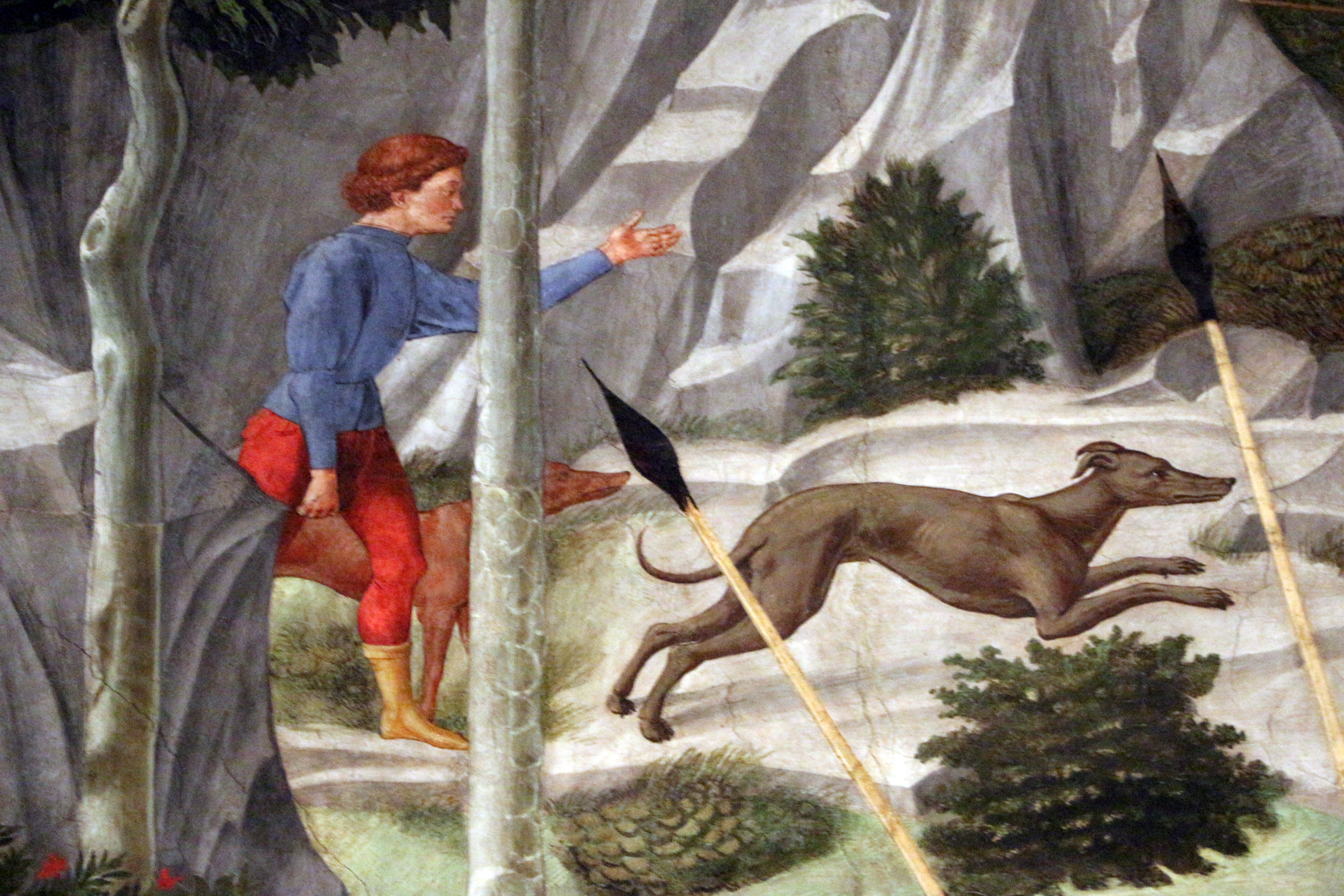
Hunting scene

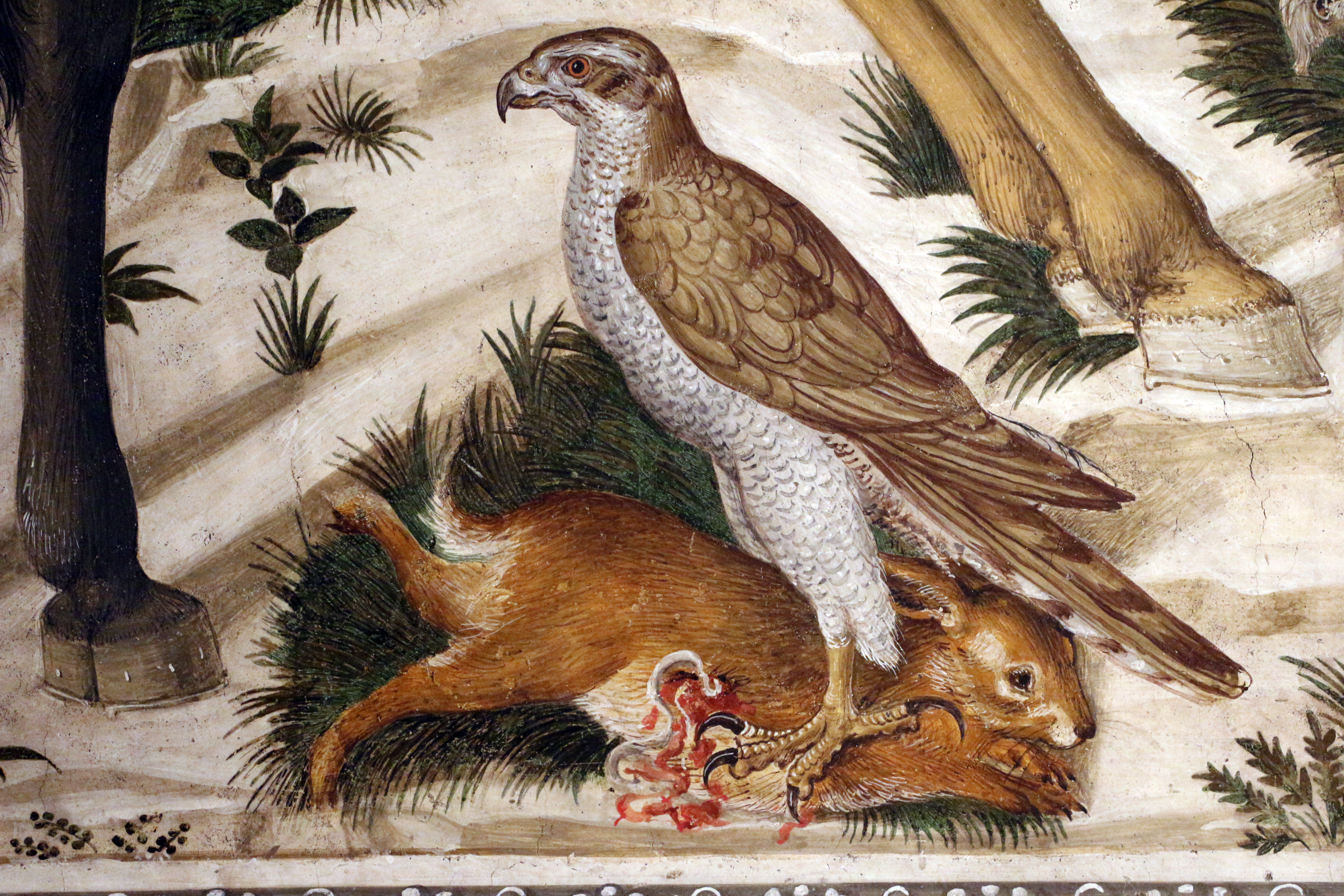
Falcon and hare

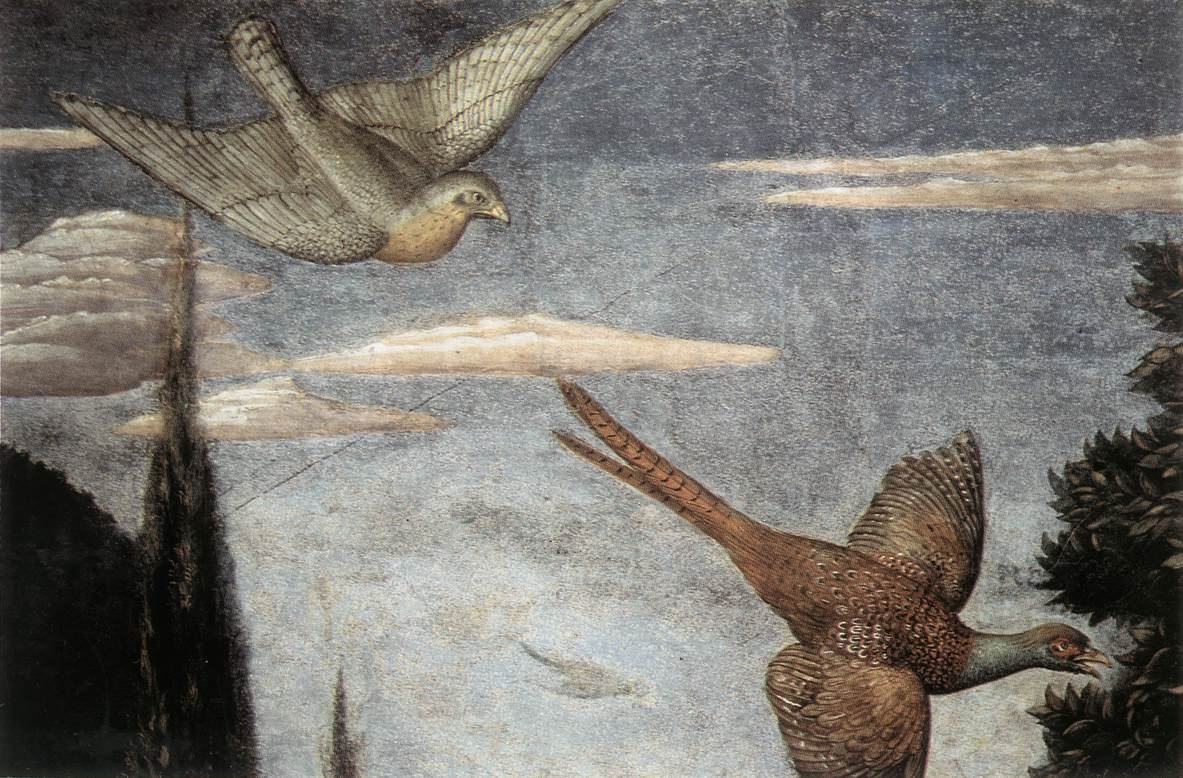
Birds in flight

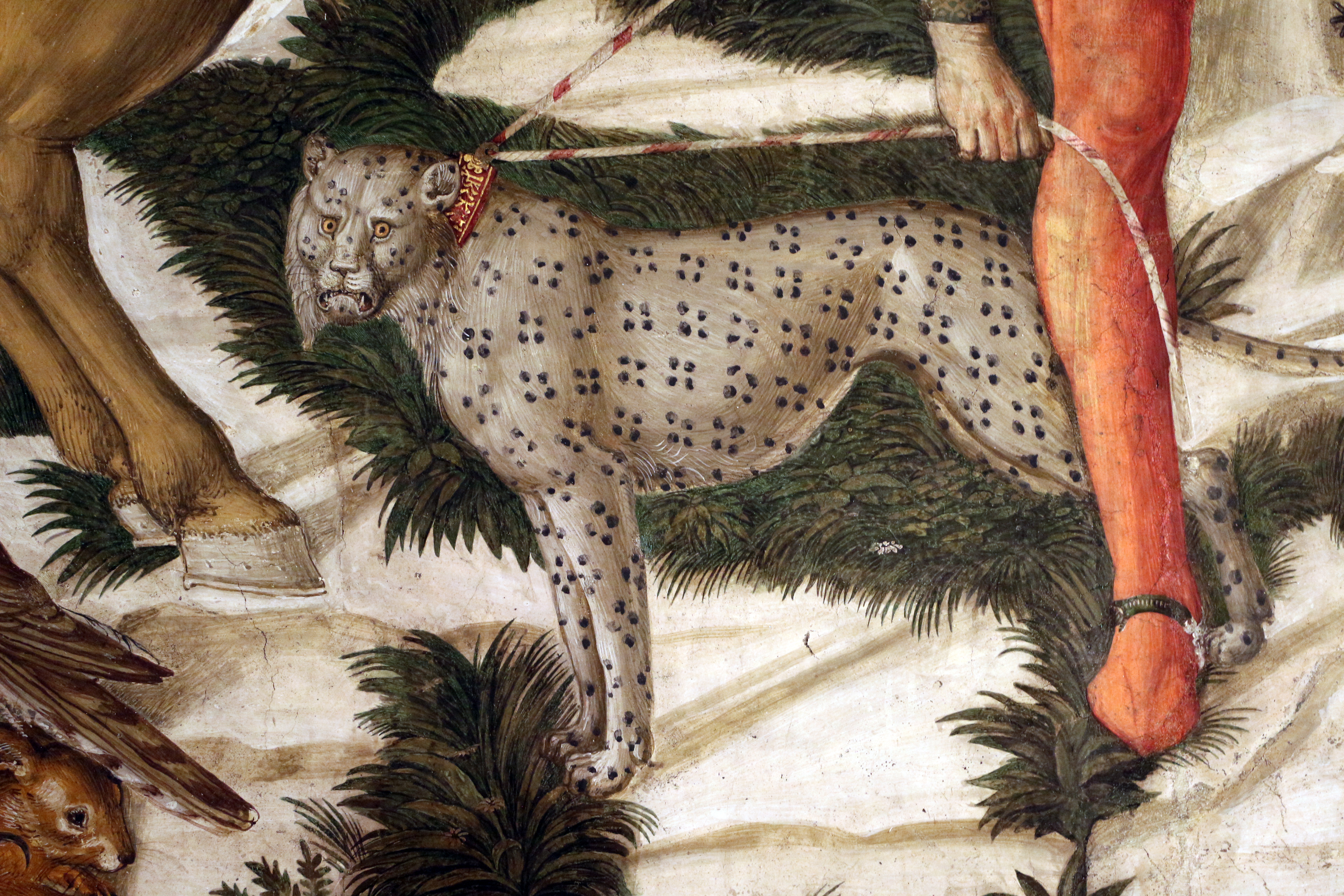
Exotic felid

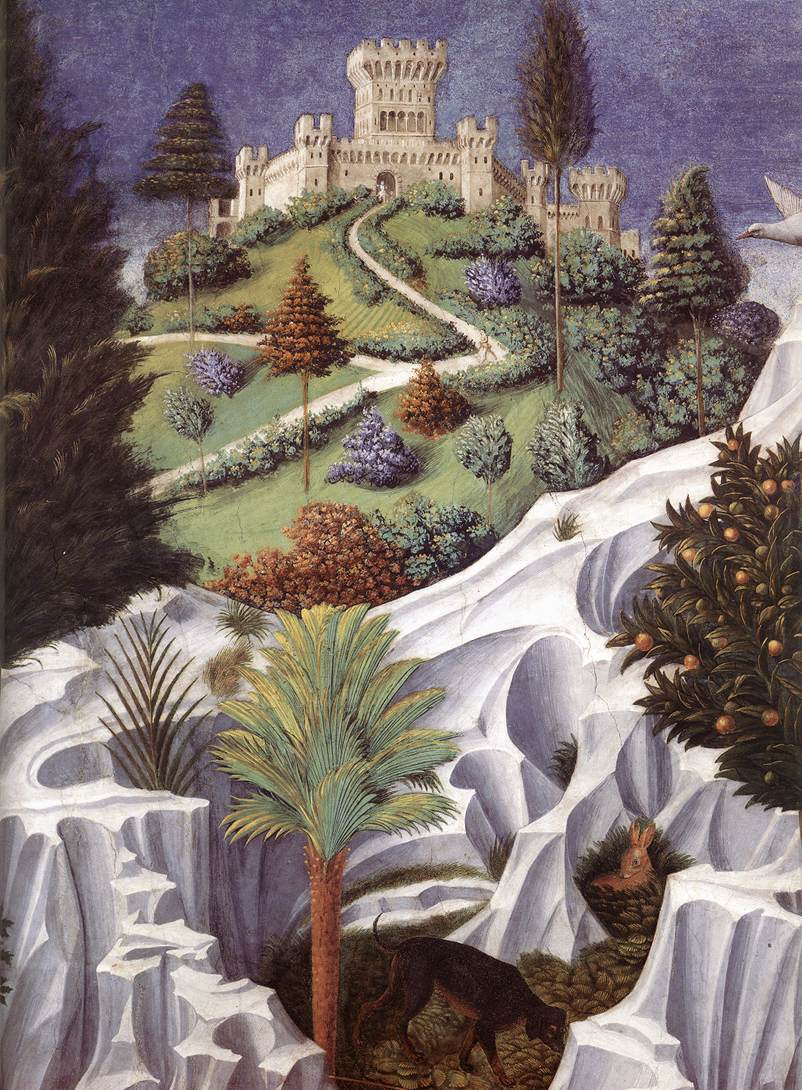
Jerusalem/Cafaggiolo

== See also ==
- Flagellation of Christ (Piero della Francesca) - another painting featuring contemporary portraits, the identities of which have been hotly debated.
- Adoration of the Magi (Sandro Botticelli) - a painting featuring prominent Medici family members as the Magi.
- Madonna of the Magnificat (Sandro Botticelli) - a painting featuring Lucrezia Tornabuoni, wife of Piero de' Medici, as Mary, while Lorenzo and Giuliano appear as angels.
- The Confirmation of the Rule (Domenico Ghirlandiao) - a painting featuring Lorenzo and his sons Giuliano, Piero and Giovanni, the latter being the future Pope Leo X.
