= The Mystical Nativity =

Painting by Sandro Botticelli

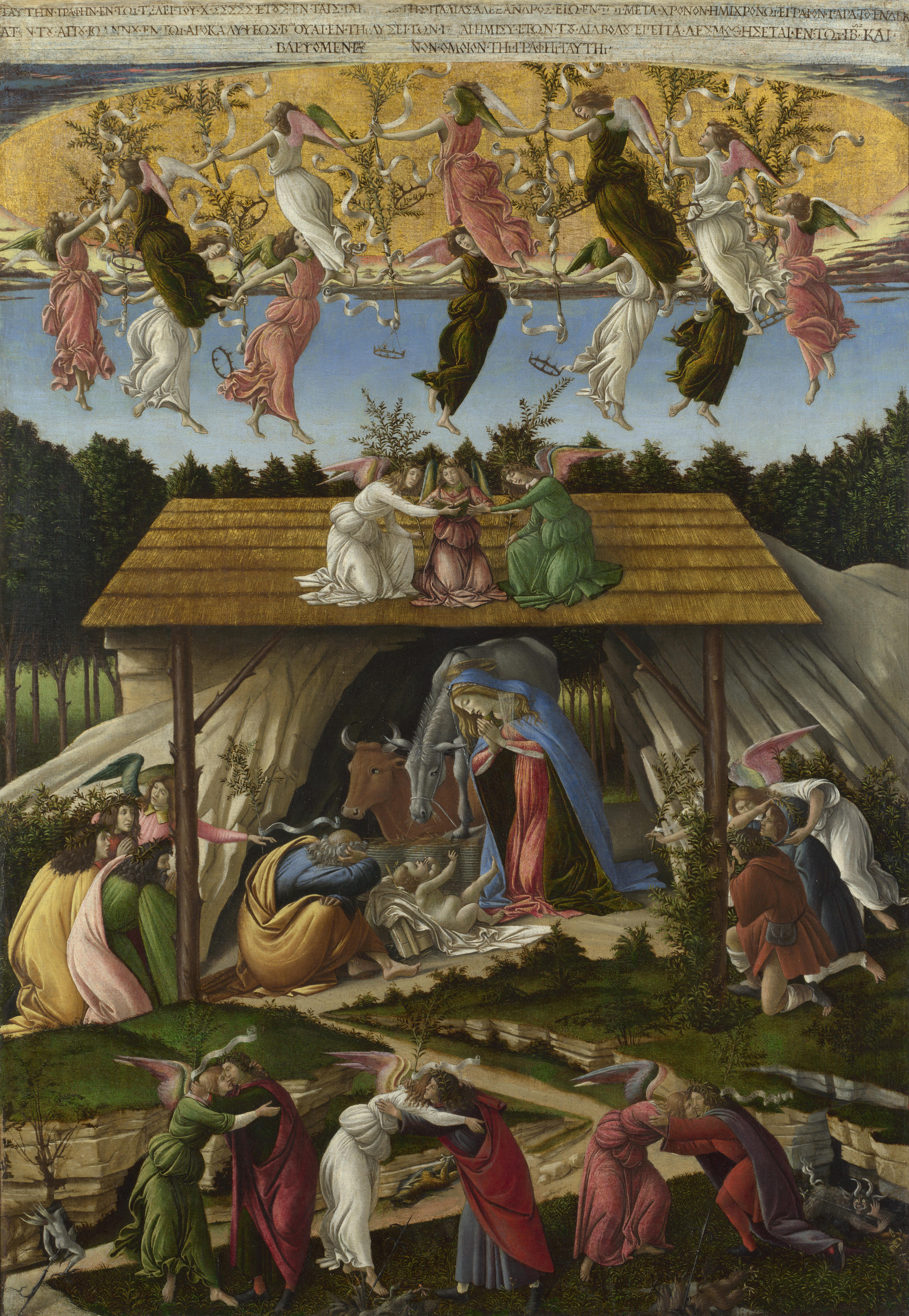
- Artist: Sandro Botticelli
- Year: c. 1500–1501
- Medium: Oil on canvas
- Dimensions: 108.5 cm × 74.9 cm (42.7 in × 29.5 in)
- Location: National Gallery, London

The Mystical Nativity is a modern name given to an oil painting on canvas executed c. 1500–1501 by the Italian Renaissance master Sandro Botticelli that is held in the National Gallery collection in London. It is his only signed work and has an unusual iconography for a painting of the Nativity. Other aspects of the work are unusual as well.

The Greek inscription by the painter at the top of the painting translates as: 'This painting, at the end of the year 1500, in the troubles of Italy, I, Alessandro, in the half-time after the time, painted, according to the eleventh [chapter] of Saint John, in the second woe of the Apocalypse, during the release of the devil for three and a half years; then he shall be bound in the twelfth [chapter] and we shall see [him buried] as in this picture'. Botticelli believed he was living during the Great Tribulation, and possibly due to the upheavals in Europe at the time, may have been predicting Christ's millennium as stated in the Book of Revelation.

The painting is connected with the influence of Girolamo Savonarola, whose influence appears in a number of late paintings by Botticelli, although the scene depicted in the painting may have been specified by those commissioning the work.

The painting uses the earlier medieval convention of showing the Virgin Mary and infant Jesus larger both than other figures and their surroundings rather than following the advances seen in early Renaissance art; this distortion was certainly created deliberately for effect, as earlier works by Botticelli use correct graphical perspective.

The painting is not to be confused with the Mystical Nativity or Adoration in the Forest by Filippo Lippi, now in Berlin.

== Description ==
The Virgin Mary is shown kneeling before the Christ Child in the centre, both are on a larger scale than the other figures. Joseph sits on the ground next to the child, perhaps asleep, with his face not visible. Behind the family are an ox and an ass. On either side of the main group an angel with an olive branch in an outstretched hand shows the child to two shepherds and three men in long gowns, perhaps the biblical Magi. These five are kneeling and crowned with olive branches. At the bottom of the work, three angels embrace three men also with olive details on their head. Around them, seven small devils are piercing themselves with lances and falling back into the underworld, "burying themselves".

== Historical context ==
The painting depicts a scene of joy and celebration, of earthly and heavenly delight with angels dancing at the top of the painting, but art historians now have research and scientific tools that give more depth to the interpretation of the painting. At the top of the painting Sandro Botticelli's name appears – but also the apocalyptic and troubling words. And there are dark premonitions – the helpless child rests on a sheet that evokes the shroud in which his body will one day be wrapped, while the cave in which the scene is set calls to mind his tomb. The kings on the left bear no gifts, but their own devotion. At the top of the painting twelve angels dressed in the colours of faith, hope, and charity dance in a circle holding olive branches, and above them heaven opens in a great golden dome, while at the bottom of the painting three angels embrace three men, seeming to raise them up from the ground. They hold scrolls that proclaim in Latin, "peace on earth to men of goodwill". Behind them seven devils flee to the underworld, some impaled on their own weapons. In Renaissance times, Last Judgment paintings showed viewers the reckoning of the damned and the saved at the time of Christ's Second Coming. According to art historian Jonathan Nelson, "in echoing this kind of painting the Mystical Nativity is asking us to think not only of Christ's birth but of his return".

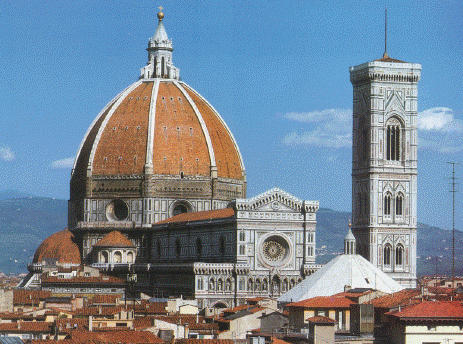
Savonarola's preaching attracted huge crowds to Florence Cathedral – like much of the city, Botticelli had come under his sway.

The painting emerged from the city of Florence in a time when the preacher Girolamo Savonarola held the city in its grip. He had arrived in Florence in 1490 and was repelled by the artistic glory and enormous wealth that so impressed the world. He preached that Florence was a corrupt and vice-ridden place. A great scourge was approaching – and then his words had assumed a terrifying reality: the Italian War of 1494–1498. In 1494, a huge French army invaded Italy and 10,000 troops entered Florence. The Florentines feared the King of France meant to sack the city. Savonarola stepped into the political vacuum, he met with the French king and persuaded him to leave Florence peacefully. In their gratitude and relief the Florentines increasingly saw the friar as a prophet and his preaching attracted huge crowds to Florence Cathedral. Savonarola claimed that Florence could become the new Jerusalem if the citizens would repent and abandon their sinful luxuries – and that included much of their art. His beliefs were made real as groups of evangelical youths went onto the streets to encourage people to part with their luxuries, their lewd pictures, and books, their vanities, combs, mirrors. Botticelli may well have seen his own paintings fed to the flames. Yet the artist might not have objected because, like much of the city, he too had come under the sway of Savonarola. It seems that a sermon preached by Savonarola bears directly upon the Mystical Nativity.

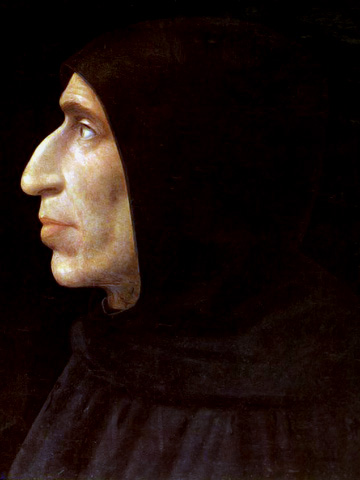
A sermon Savonarola had preached set forth a vision resembling what appears in the painting.

For years Savonarola held Florence in his hand, but his hardline charismatic rule made him powerful political enemies. He was challenged to prove his holiness by walking through fire and when he refused, the tide of opinion turned against him. He was arrested and under torture, confessed to being a false prophet. On 23 May 1498, he was hanged with two of his leading lieutenants, their bodies burnt, and their ashes scattered in the river Arno. Some see the figures of the three men at the bottom of the painting as representatives of the three executed holy men, raised up, and restored to grace – but persecution not peace awaited Savonarola's followers and it was in an atmosphere of oppression that Botticelli painted the Mystical Nativity.

In one sermon Savonarola had preached he set forth a vision that had come to him in which he saw an extraordinary heavenly crown. At its base were twelve hearts with twelve ribbons wrapped around them and written on these ribbons in Latin were the unique mystical qualities or privileges of the Virgin Mary – she is 'mother of her father', 'daughter of her son', 'bride of God', etc. In the painting, although much of the writing on the ribbons held by the dancing angels is now invisible to the naked eye, infrared reflectography has shown that the original words on those ribbons correspond exactly to Savonarola's twelve privileges of the Virgin. In his sermon, preached on Assumption Day, Savonarola went on to explore the 11th and 12th chapters of the Book of Revelation – the precise chapters mentioned in the painting's inscription. Savonarola connected the glory of Mary with the imminent coming of the power of Christ on earth.

== Technique ==
Normally Botticelli used wood panels for his paintings. This painting is on canvas. Art historians suggest that perhaps for a painting with a dangerous message, canvas had the advantage that it could be rolled up and hidden. His painting method has been the subject of research. With his canvas prepared he would sketch a detailed design on paper, then he transferred this to canvas. He drew on many sources – the dancing angels echo his own three graces of Primavera, the scurrying devil was inspired by a German woodcut. X-rays show that very little of the original design changed – only an angel's wing was adjusted and trees added above the roof of the stable. Botticelli was now ready to build up the image using tempera paint – the canvas was an experimental medium. To create the heavenly dome Botticelli called on the goldsmith's craft he had learned as a boy. "The symbolism of the gold is to do with the unchanging, untarnished nature of heaven – gold doesn't decay, it doesn't darken like silver. Botticelli would have used an adhesive layer made of oil mixed with resin – not burnished, the gold just patted down on to the surface, following the surface irregularities of the canvas – a glitter, intricate, it would have helped the jewel like quality of the painting – it would have drawn the eye upwards from the Nativity into Heaven. Faith, hope and charity, [the angels clothed in] white, green and red – but the copper based green pigment has discoloured with time, to bronze. Originally it would have been vibrant."

== Modern interest and influence ==
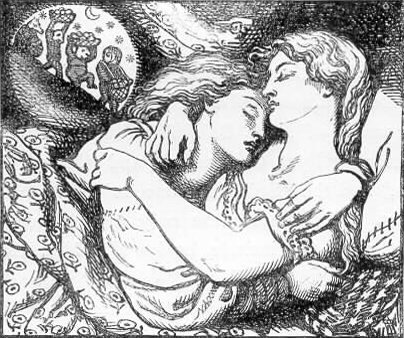
By Dante Gabriel Rossetti (1862), who was interested in figures locked in embrace; cf. the embracing figures at the bottom of the Mystical Nativity.

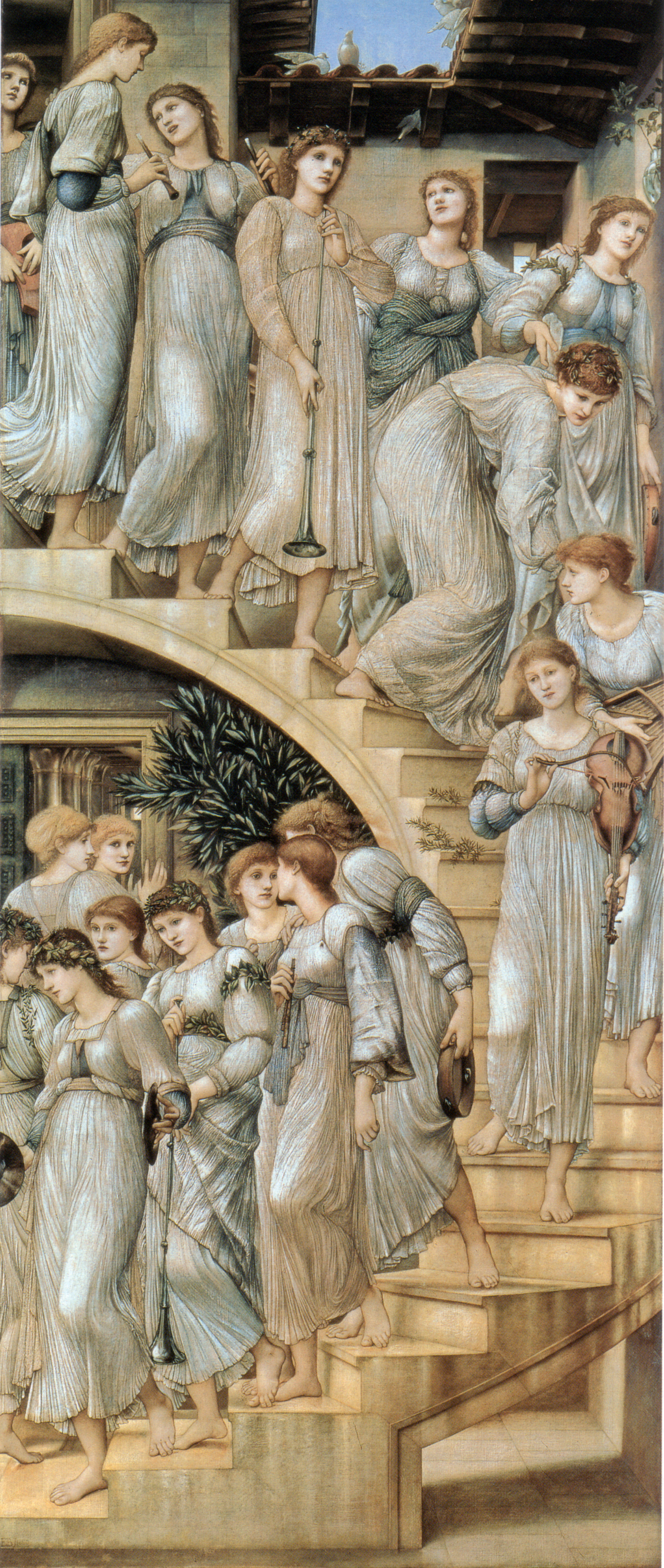
A Burne-Jones painting was influenced by the Botticelli technique.

Botticelli died in 1510. The Mystical Nativity remained little known for another three centuries. At the end of the eighteenth century Rome was very different from Renaissance Florence – except for the presence of French invaders. Many foreigners left, but not a young Englishman, William Young Ottley. He was an art lover, and wealthy with a slave plantation in the Caribbean. He bought up many paintings cheaply. At the Villa Aldobrandini he saw a small, unknown work, Botticelli's Mystical Nativity. Botticelli was then in obscurity. The painting arrived in London where Ottley's house became, in effect, a private museum of Italian masterpieces.

After Ottley's death William Fuller Maitland of Stansted picked up the painting at an auction for £80. When he loaned it to the Art Treasures Exhibition, Manchester 1857, it was probably exposed to a wide public for the first time. The exhibition's newspaper the Art Treasures Examiner printed a reproduction of it.

John Ruskin helped to give the painting its name; after seeing it in London he referred to Botticelli's 'mystic symbolism'. When Maitland died in 1876 the National Gallery in London stepped in. According to Nicholas Penny the Gallery "was concerned to buy works from the earlier Renaissance – previously it had been its top priority to buy masterpieces which there would be no controversy about at all. There was an element of avant-garde excitement about buying pictures like this in the 19th century." When the Gallery bought the painting in 1878, it had to find £1,500, nearly 20 times what it had fetched just thirty years earlier.

From the moment Botticelli's art is shown in Manchester there's a real change in opinion about his work and certainly by the late 1870s, 1880s Botticelli becomes a real cult figure – somebody the artists who aspire to be on the cutting edge of the art world are looking to...Dante Gabriel Rossetti and Edward Burne-Jones both adapted elements of it for their own work. Burne-Jones copied some of Botticelli's illustrations for Dante's Divine Comedy into his own sketchbooks. Rossetti demonstrated his affection for Botticelli's work by buying his portrait of Smeralda Bandinelli in 1867.

Burne-Jones commented about his own 1880 work, The Golden Stairs: "All those little toes that are climbing down the stairs – you can see the fascination with the patterns of the toes that are circling in the angels of the Mystical Nativity... The Mystical Nativity worked a particular magic on members of the Pre-Raphaelite circle."

== See also ==
- List of works by Sandro Botticelli
