= Mystical Nativity (Filippo Lippi) =

c. 1459 painting by Filippo Lippi

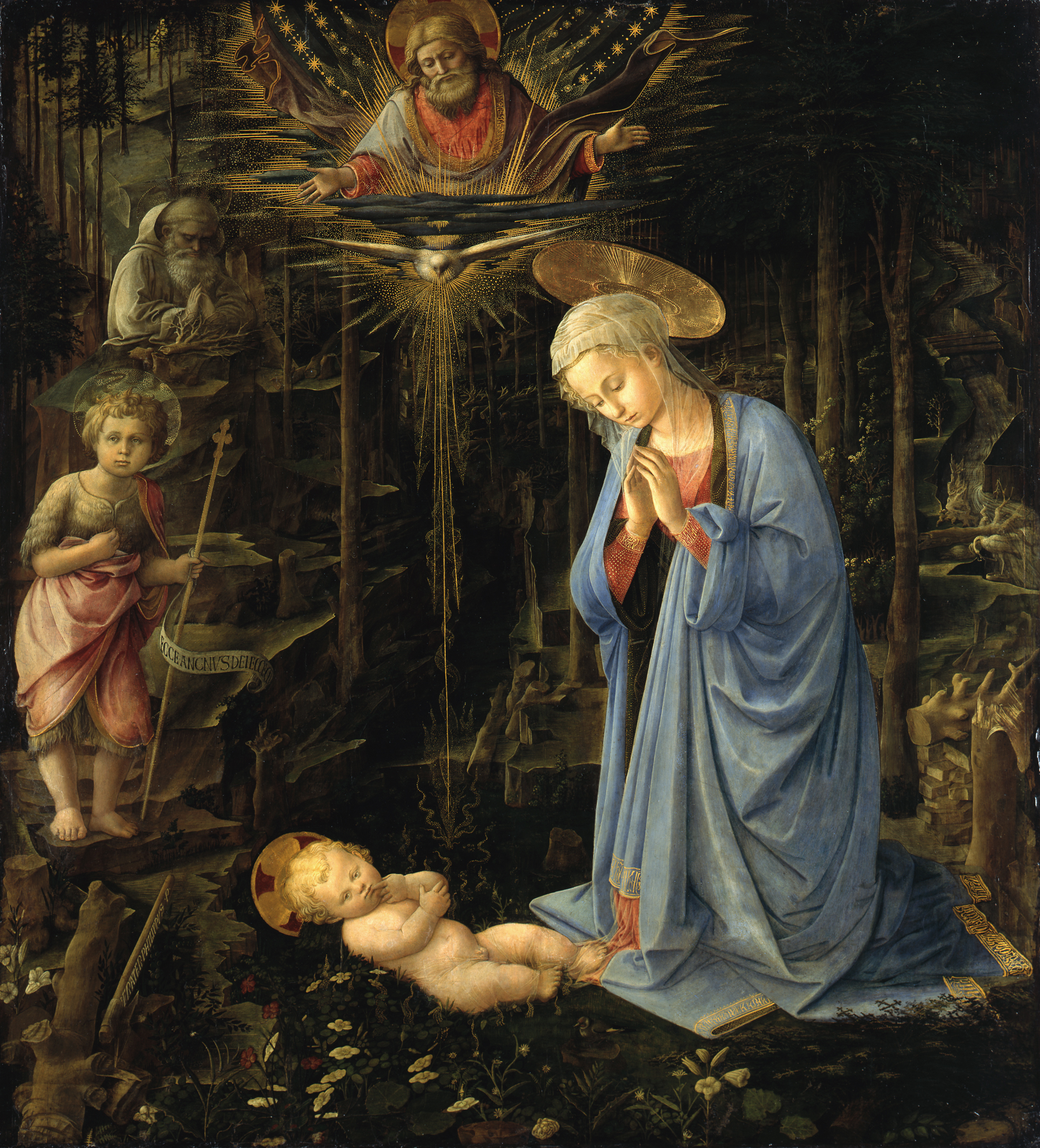
Fra Filippo Lippi, Mystical Nativity or The Adoration in the Forest, c. 1459

The Mystical Nativity or Adoration in the Forest was painted by Fra Filippo Lippi (c. 1406 – 1469) around 1459 as the altarpiece for the Magi Chapel in the new Palazzo Medici in Florence. It is now in the Gemäldegalerie, Berlin, with a copy by another artist now hanging in the chapel. It is a highly individual depiction of the familiar scene of the Nativity of Jesus in art, placed in a mountainous forest setting, with debris from woodcutting all around, rather than the familiar stable in Bethlehem, and with the usual figures and animals around the mother and child replaced by others.

The painting is in oil on a poplar panel, and the painted surface measures 127 x 116 cm, with the panel being 129.5 x 118.5 cm. It is not to be confused with The Mystical Nativity by Sandro Botticelli, now in the National Gallery in London.

== Description ==
The moment shown is known as the Adoration of the Child in art, as the almost naked baby Jesus is placed on the ground, and "adored" by his mother Mary. The lower part of his body is covered by a gauzy and transparent cloth. They are on a patch of ground with grass, several types of flower in bloom, but also some of the debris of forestry that appears throughout the forest background. To the left, the infant John the Baptist stands, wearing his attribute of a camelskin coat under a red robe. He carries a small cross on a long staff, and holds a banderole inscribed Ecce Agnus Dei ("Behold the Lamb of God"). However, he is shown as perhaps five or six years old, a much bigger age difference with the newborn Jesus than the church taught.

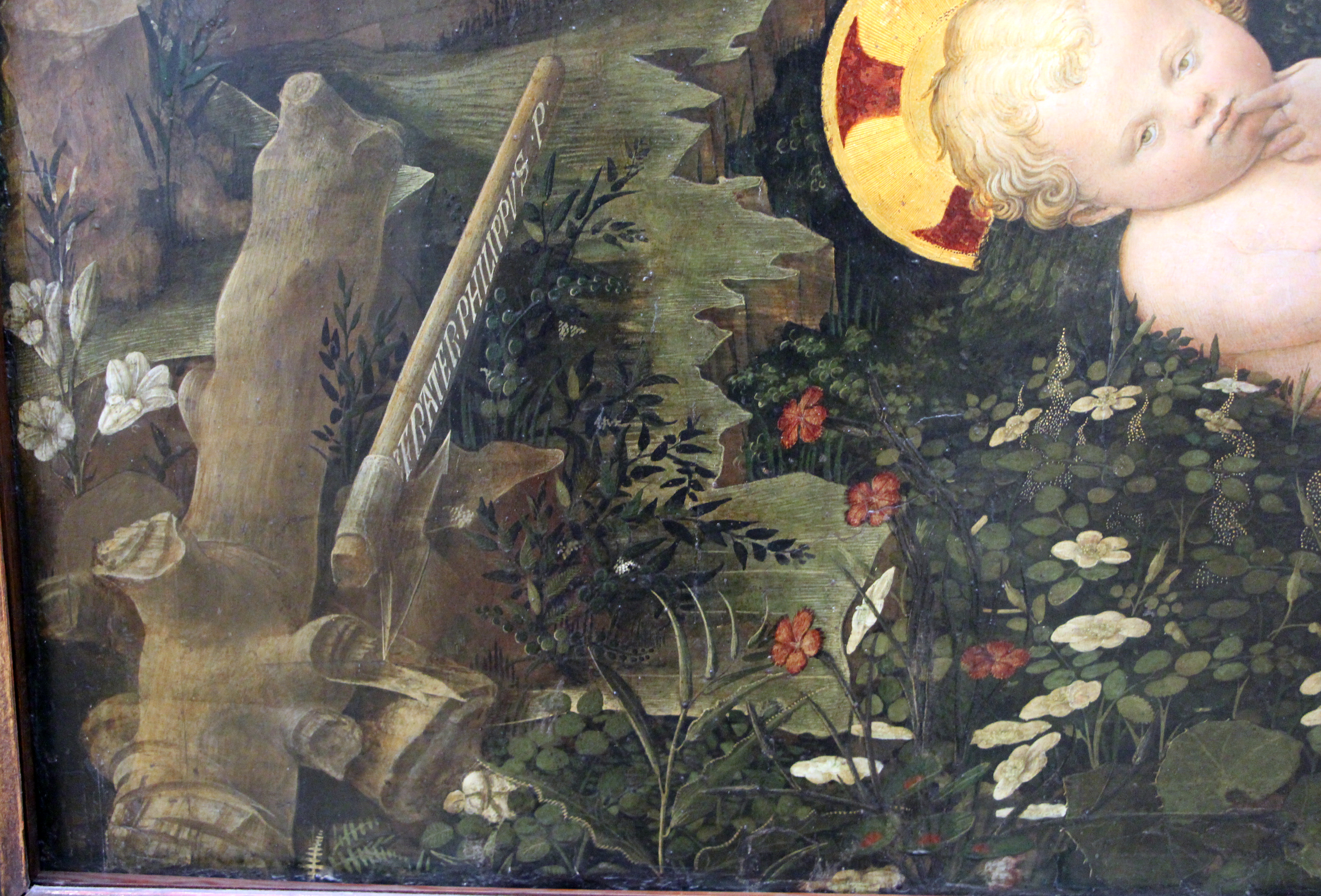
The signature on the axe handle

Above John the Baptist is the praying figure of Saint Romuald (c.951 – c. 1025/27), founder of the Camaldolese order of monks, to which the Medici family, the patrons of the painting had connections. At the top of the painting, slightly off-centre, are the two other persons of the Christian Holy Trinity, God the Father and the Holy Spirit, represented as a dove. All these figures form a near-continuous rough circle, slightly off-centre to the left. John's figure almost reaches the left edge of the painted surface, but on the right of the composition there is a generous slice of background, interrupted only by Mary's robe. It is not uncommon to have saints and persons not mentioned in the biblical accounts in Nativity scenes, but in addition to the normal elements. In contrast, as Hartt puts it, here there is "no cave, no shed, no Joseph, no angels, no ox, no ass".

The scene is set on a steep slope in a rather dark forest, mostly consisting of pine trees, which runs right to the top of the composition, so that no sky can be seen. Stumps, discarded pieces of tree and other evidence of woodcutting is all around, and Lippi has signed his name ("FRATER PHILIPPUS P[inxit]" – "Brother Phillip painted this") along the handle of an axe struck into a stump in the bottom left-hand corner. A small, evidently fast-running, stream runs down the right-hand side of the painting, crossed by a crude bridge of planks. On the other side of this, near the top of the painting there is a small hut-like building. On the near side of the stream a crane or heron preens itself. A small goldfinch is perched on a stump at the front of the picture-space, near Jesus's foot; a common symbol in art for the Passion of Christ in the future.

== Context ==
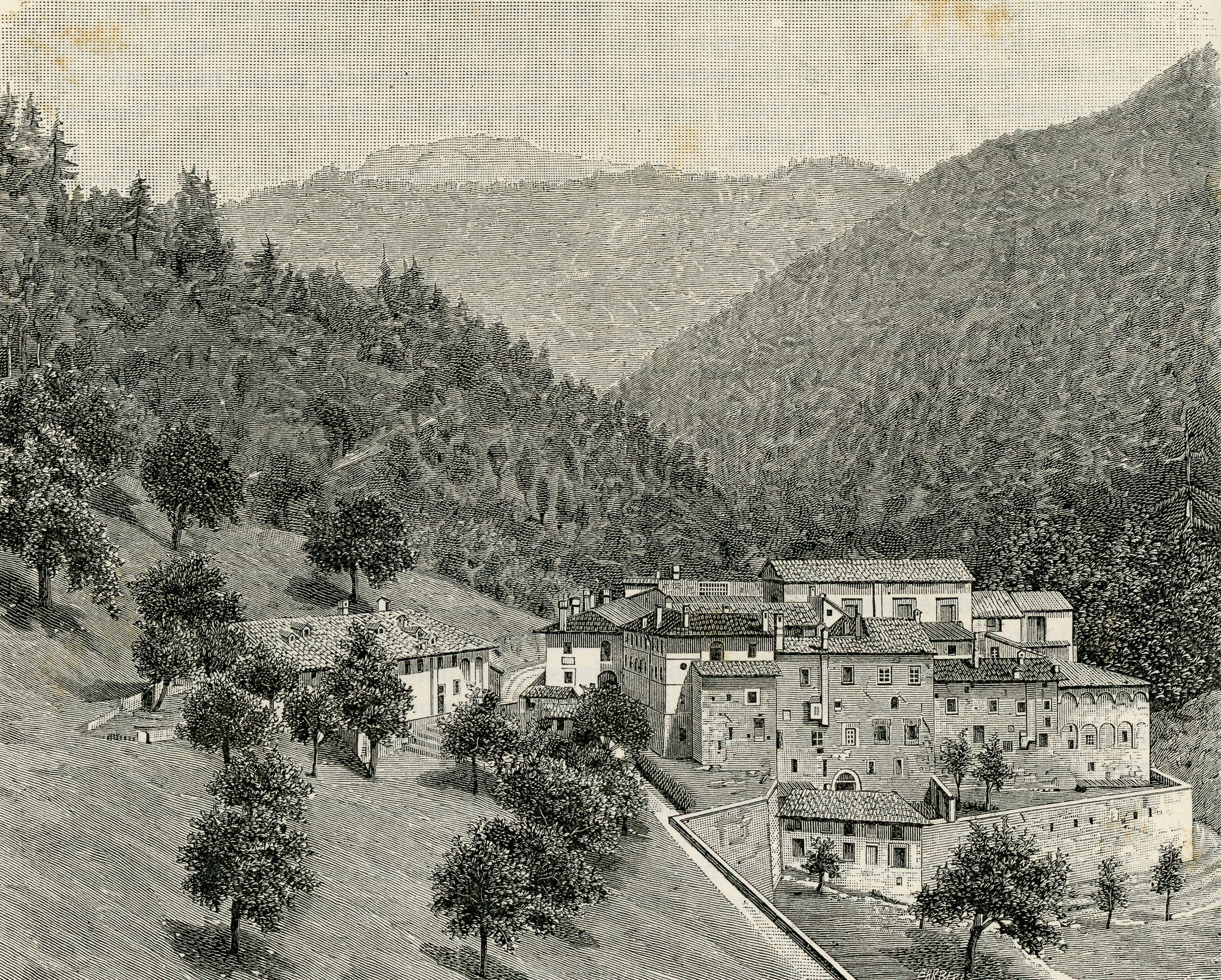
The Camaldoli monastery, 1898

Having a "portable altar", and so a private chapel, in a family city house was at this time a rather rare privilege; the Medici's right to do so had been granted in a papal bull of Pope Martin V in 1422. Only nine Florentine families were given the right in this period, and most of the identifiable altarpieces for such chapels featured several saints associated with the family, often the namesakes of members.

By 1563 the lack of the normal elements of a Nativity scene would be partly redressed by the completion of the famous frescos of the Procession of the Magi by Benozzo Gozzoli that cover most of the other walls of the Magi Chapel, and give it its name. These show the large and lively processions of the three Biblical Magi and their crowded trains making their way to Bethlehem, and include a number of portraits of the Medici family.

Romuald was the founder of the Camoldolite order, named after their remote base at Camaldoli in the Apennines. The Medici, in particular Lucrezia Tornabuoni Medici, wife of the head of the family Piero de' Medici, were supporters of the order, and in the 1460s financed extensive rebuilding at Camaldoli, including cells reserved for their use when they visited. It is agreed that the forest in the painting represents the thick pine forests on the steep slopes around the monastery.

Woodcutting was a part of daily life for the community there, and timber for Florentine builders a major source of income. Many of the monks lived as hermits in small huts in forest clearings where they grew crops on their own plots. The cut down trees also refer to the words of John the Baptist, given in the Gospel of Matthew 3:10:

And now also the axe is laid
unto the root of the trees:
therefore every tree which
bringeth not forth good fruit is
hewn down, and cast into the fire. (Authorized Version)

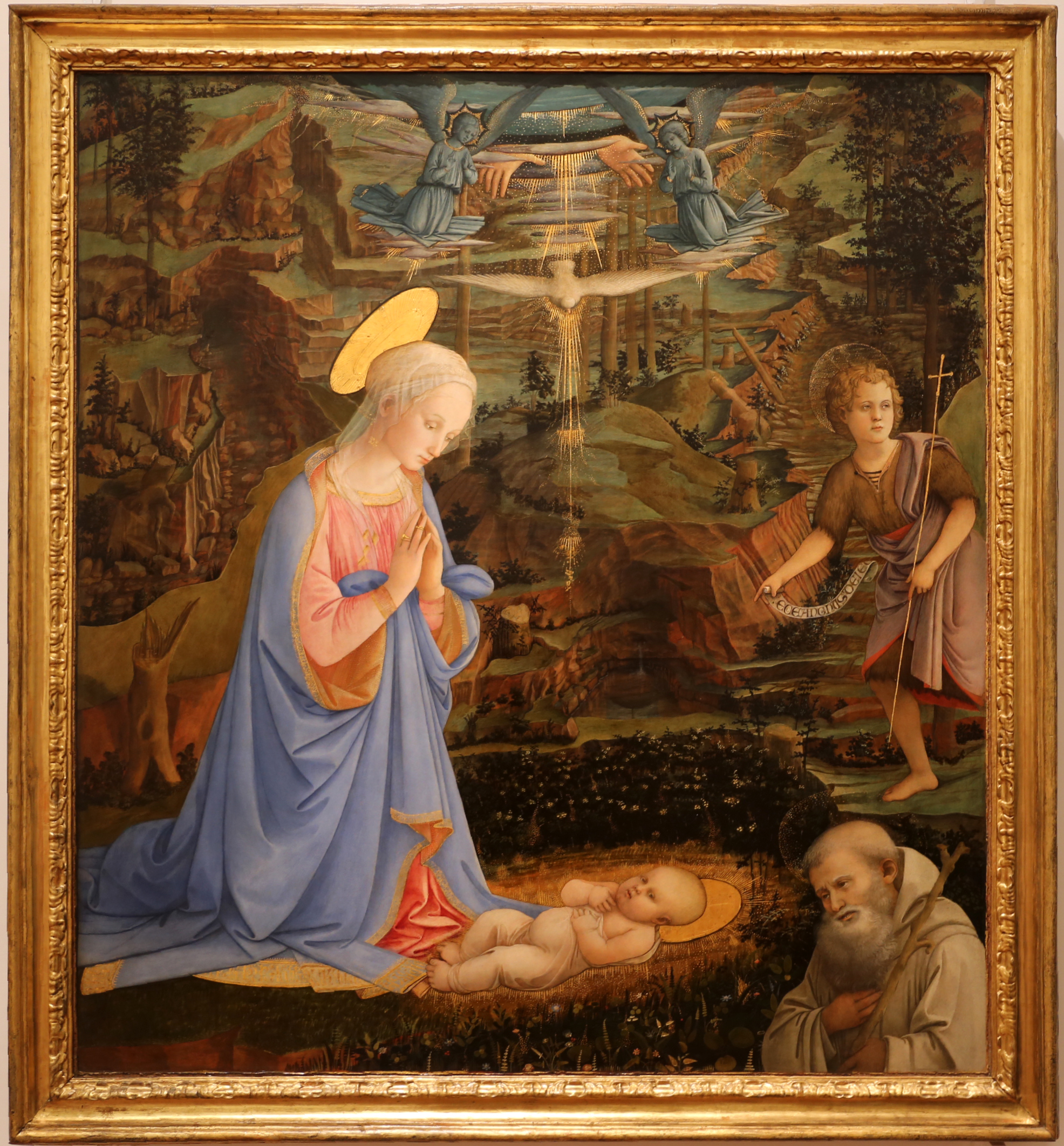
The Camaldoli Nativity by Lippi, for Lucrezia Tornabuoni Medici's cell at Camaldoli, c. 1463. 130 x 140 cm (51.1 by 55.1 inches); now Uffizi Gallery

Because of this passage, an axe was an attribute of John the Baptist in art, though by this period it was rare in Western art. It may also have had other specific and personal meanings for Lippi, arising from the traditions of his own Carmelite order.

John the Baptist was the patron saint of Florence and of the Camaldoli monastery. Lucrezia Tornabuoni Medici had a particular devotion to him, demonstrated by her poetry. There has been much discussion as to who influenced the unusual features of the painting, apart from Lippi himself. Although there is surviving correspondence showing that Piero de' Medici took a considerable interest in the Gozzoli frescos, making his wishes prevail, there is nothing comparable for the altarpiece, and it has been argued that his wife Lucrezia was more significant for that.

Another candidate is the Archbishop of Florence until his death in 1459, Saint Antoninus of Florence, who knew the Medici well. The distinctive elements of the painting were quickly repeated by Lippi in a different composition of about 1463, known as the "Camaldoli Nativity". This was painted for Lucrezia Tornabuoni Medici's "cell" (one of the small single-story houses with its own plot) in the Camaldoli monastery, the treatment no doubt specified by her; it is now in the Uffizi Gallery in Florence. Vasari says that both paintings were commissions of Lucrezia.

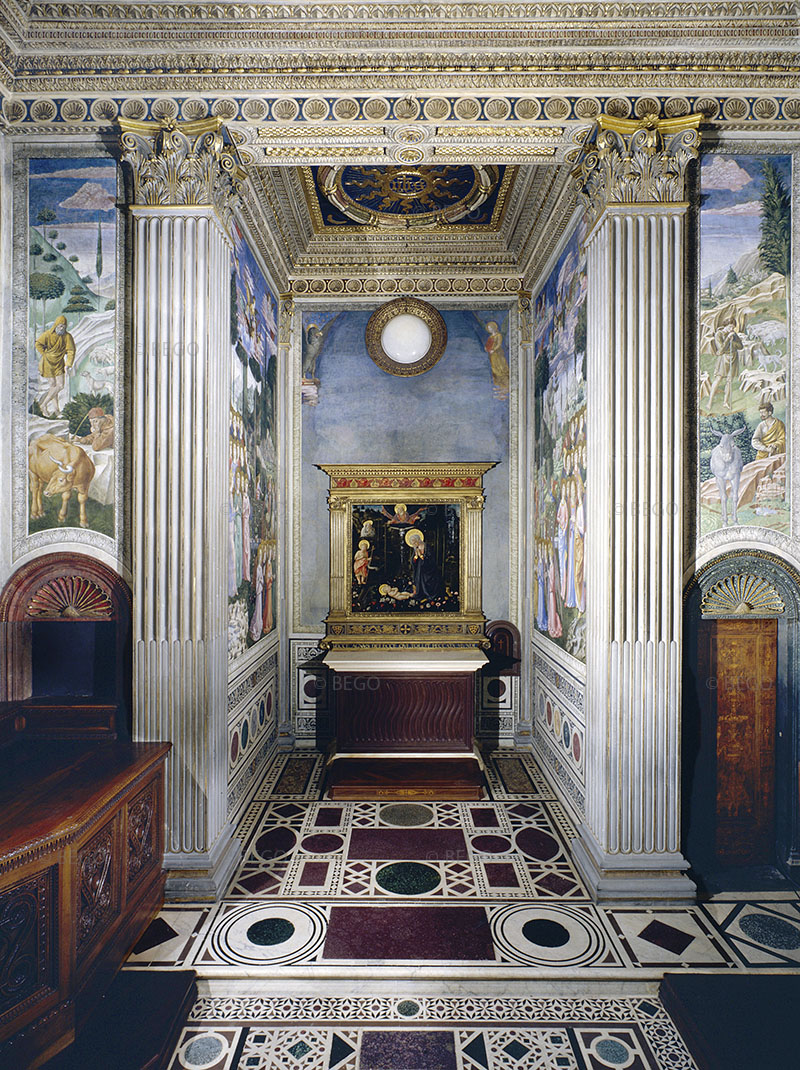
The copy in the Magi Chapel of the Palazzo Medici, flanked by parts of Gozzoli's frescos

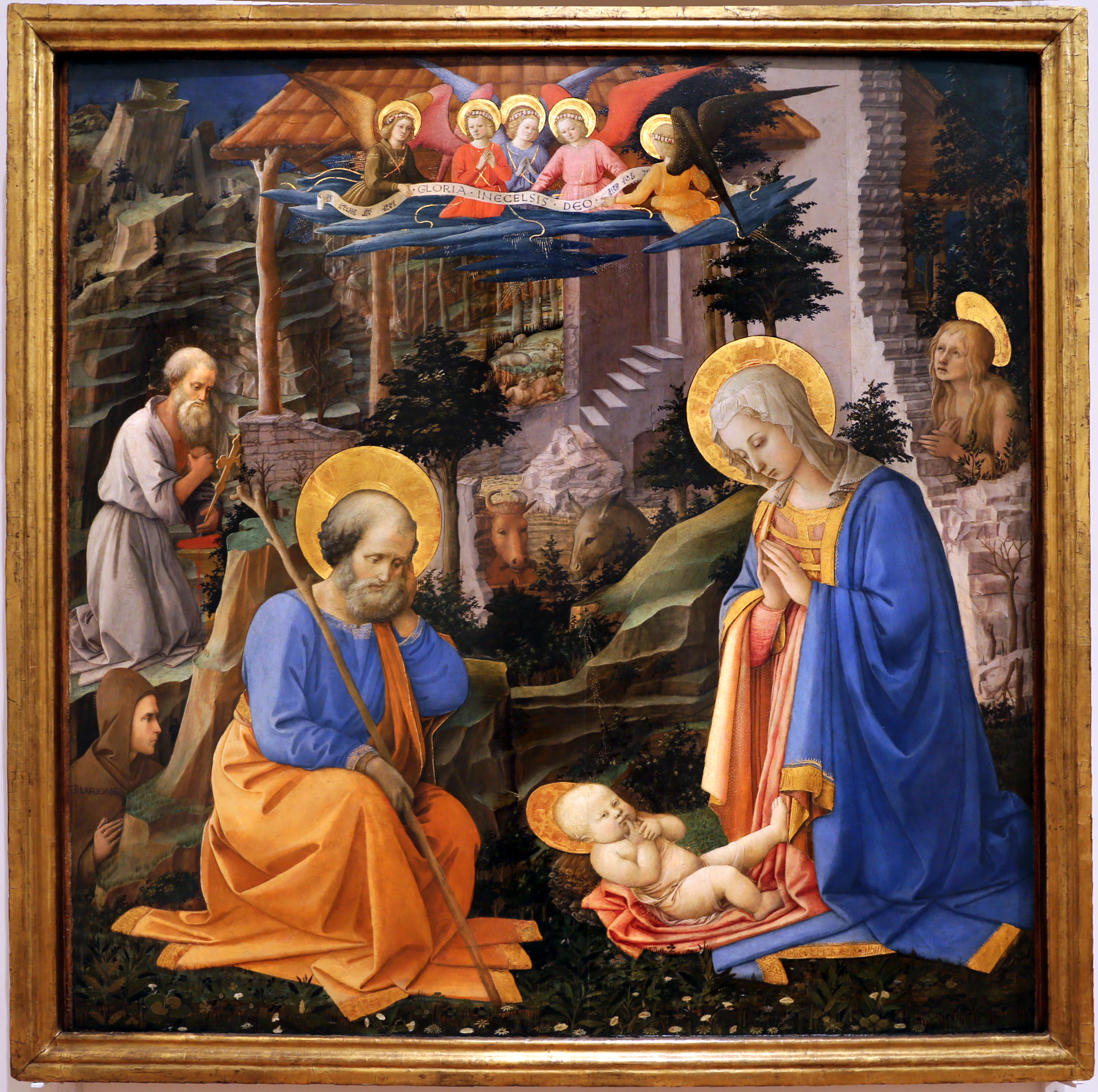
The Annalena Nativity by Lippi, c. 1455, Uffizi Gallery

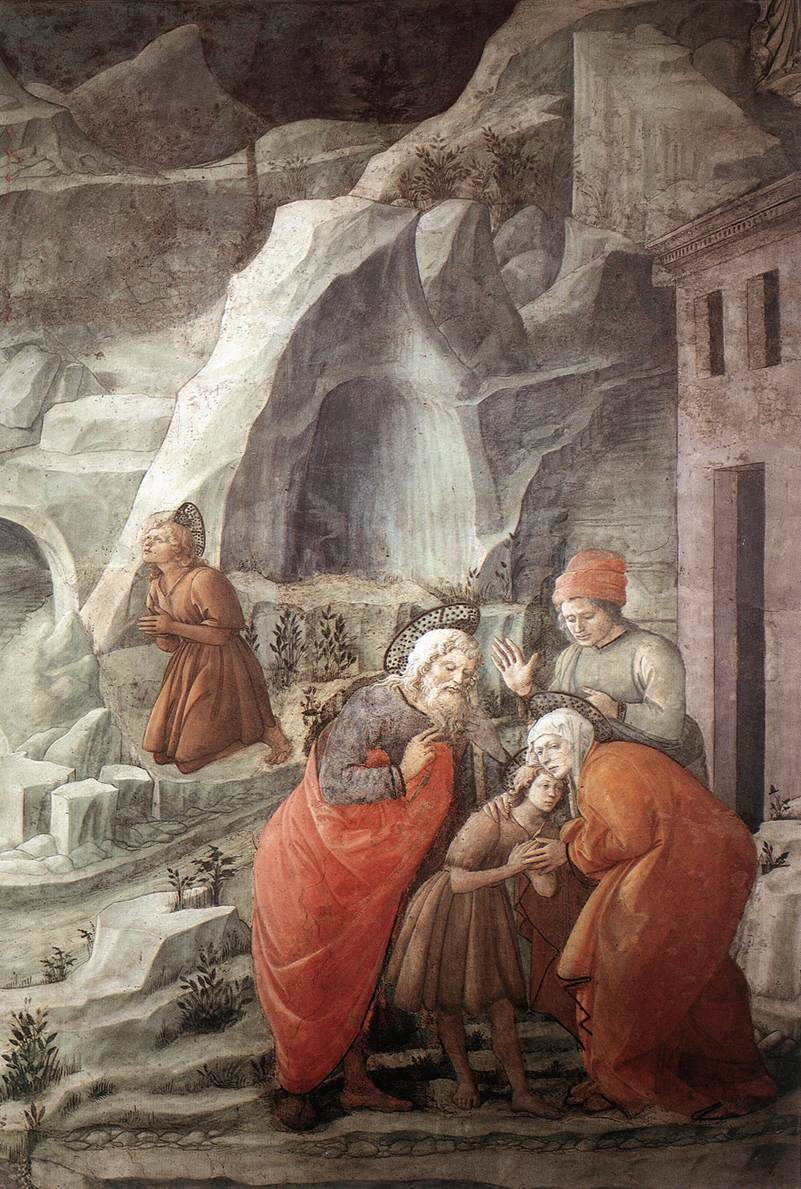
Lippi and workshop, fresco in Prato Cathedral, John the Baptist Bids Farewell to his Family

== History ==
The painting was created at the height of the power of the Medici family; Piero was dead within a few years, and the power of their many enemies grew until the main family members were expelled from Florence in 1494. Their goods were confiscated, and the Lippi was for several years hung as the altarpiece in the chapel of the Palazzo Vecchio, headquarters of the republic. When the Medici returned in 1512 they reclaimed it and it returned to their palace, where it remained for the next three centuries. Although not on public display, the painting was very well-known and much copied.

The Englishman Edward Solly, whose large fortune came appropriately from trading timber, bought the painting in 1814, during the upheavals of the Napoleonic wars, and it was acquired for the Berlin collection in 1821, as part of a large sale of his collection. It became famous and popular with the public on display in Berlin over the next century, and in 1940 was moved with other important works to safe storage in a Berlin bunker. In 1945 this was not felt safe enough, and with thousands of other artworks and other valuables it was moved to a potassium mine.

The US Army took the mine in the same year. At the end of the war the Americans intended, like the Russians, to permanently seize artworks owned by the German government, and over strong protests from the "Monuments Men", the Lippi was one of 202 artworks shipped to the US. On arrival they were hung in the basement of the National Gallery of Art in Washington, but the collection was not opened to the public, as the seizure had become controversial, with criticism in the press and Congress. Eventually the paintings were displayed as a temporary exhibition in the National Gallery, which toured to twelve cities in 1948–49; they were then sent back to Germany. The touring exhibition was a huge success, seen by over ten million people. After returning to West Berlin, the painting had a number of homes in the Berlin State Museums before the new building of the Gemäldegalerie at the Kulturforum was opened in 1998.

== See also ==
- The Mystical Nativity by Sandro Botticelli, 1500–01
