= Benozzo =

Benozzo is both an early Italian masculine given name and a surname. Notable people with the name include:

== Given name ==
- Benozzo Federighi (died 1450), Italian Roman Catholic bishop of Fiesole (1421–1450)
- Benozzo Gozzoli (1420/1421–1497), Italian Renaissance painter from Florence

== Surname ==
- Alesso di Benozzo (1473–1528), Italian Renaissance painter
- Francesco Benozzo (1969–2025), Italian poet, musician and philologist
