= Purification of the Virgin (Gozzoli) =

Painting by Benozzo Gozzoli

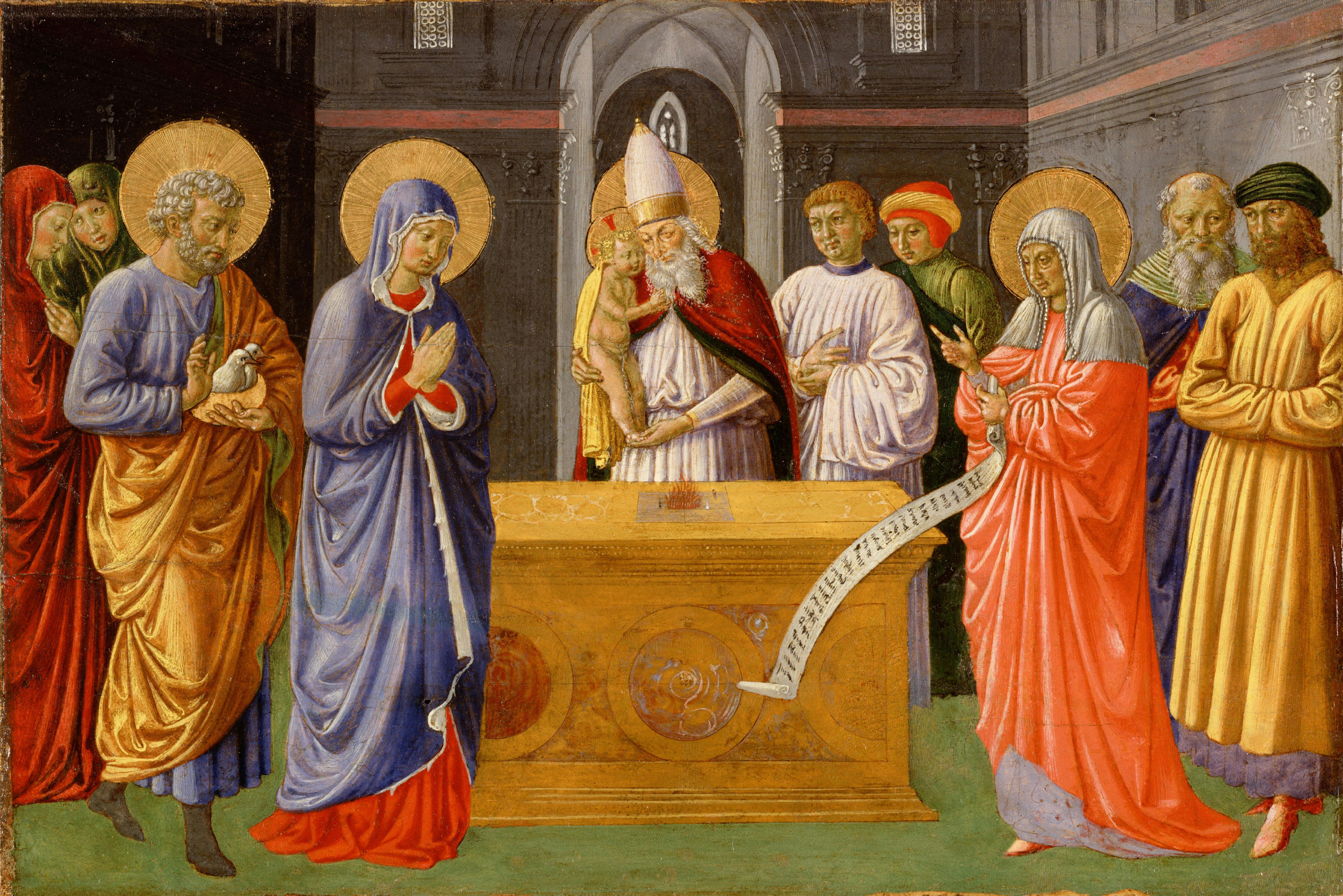
- Artist: Benozzo Gozzoli
- Year: 1461–1462
- Medium: Tempera and tooled gold on panel
- Dimensions: 24.8 cm × 36.4 cm (9.8 in × 14.3 in)
- Location: Philadelphia Museum of Art

The Purification of the Virgin is a painting in tempera on panel from an altarpiece by Benozzo Gozzoli and once owned by the Compagnia di Santa Maria della Purificazione e di San Zanobi of Florence, Italy. The painting is on display in the Philadelphia Museum of Art in Philadelphia, Pennsylvania, United States of America.

== Description ==
This panel is part of a predella, or a series of narrative scenes below the main depiction above in a polyptych. This particular polyptych was broken up and widely dispersed. Companion panels for this piece are in the National Gallery, London; the British Royal Collection; the Pinacoteca di Brera, Milan; the Gemäldegalerie, Berlin; and the National Gallery of Art, Washington, D.C. This panel entered the John G. Johnson Collection by 1917.

The altarpiece was commissioned by the Company from Gozzoli on October 23, 1461. The company also included in its title Zenobius, the name of the putative first bishop of Florence. The company sponsored services in the Convent of San Marco in Florence, and was patronized by the Medici family. The company was likely active promoting either or both the ritual post-partum purifications or it the feast of the purification, which was celebrated forty days after Christmas. Putatively the architecture of the scene resembles an interior in San Marco.

The scene depicts events described in the Gospel of Luke (Luke 2:22–40). The events are also often described as the Presentation of Jesus at the Temple. According to Jewish law, a first-born child needs to be brought about a month after birth to the temple for redemption (pidyon haben) and a post-partum mother requires ritual purification. Joseph has brought Mary and her infant Jesus to the temple in Jerusalem. Due to his poverty, he brings a pair of doves for sacrifice in his arms. There are gilded haloes identifying the five sanctified individuals in the scene: Joseph, Mary (center in typical blue and red gown), Jesus, Simeon with a bishop's mitre, and Anna with an unrolled scroll on the left. Simeon in the scene recognizes the infant as the future redeemer. Anna, an elderly woman in the temple, also recognized him as the future redeemer. An awkward small flame is present in the altar before Simeon. On the right, two elegant men appear to view the scene with doubt.
