= Adoration of the Magi (San Marco) =

Fresco by Fra Angelico

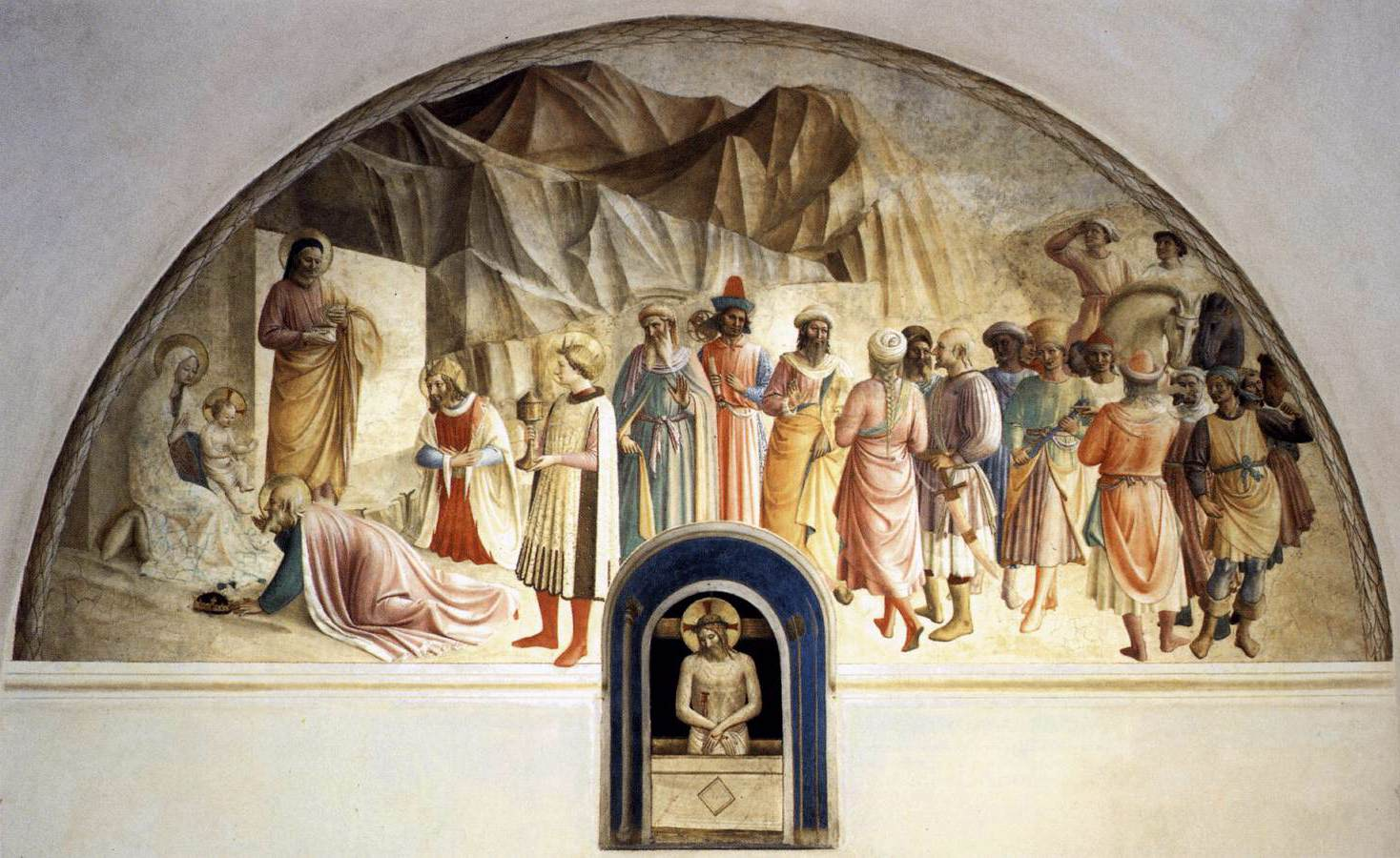
Adoration of the Magi by Fra Angelico in San Marco (c. 1441–1442)

The Adoration of the Magi in San Marco is a fresco by Fra Angelico in a double cell used by Cosimo de' Medici, created c. 1441–1442.

The paintings in the double cell differ in some respects from Fra Angelico's frescos in others cells. The pictorial language is more descriptive and the colours are brighter and the composition is more complex. Compared to the other cells the contribution from Fra Angelico is less and those of his assistants, particularly Benozzo Gozzoli, is greater.

The scene is generally dated to a period close to the Crucifixion with saints, with which it has some stylistic features in common, just after the completion of the cells on the outer side of the east corridor. Some relate this scene to the Council of Florence, held in 1439, due to the presence of characters with oriental shapes.

John Pope-Hennessy attributes the entire design to Angelico, also given the prestige of the location, and also confirms the intervention by Benozzo Gozzoli, proposed by Gengaro.

The scene is the largest in the cycle of cells and has the shape of a large lunette with a recess in the center that houses a tabernacle with Christ in mercy.

The Madonna, the Child and St. Joseph are placed on the left, while they receive the homage of the three Magi who, one at a time, are kneeling and delivering the gifts. Behind them the procession unfolds, made up of men of letters, knights, men of science and soldiers. Unlike the same theme treated in the predella of the tabernacle of the Linaioli (1433–1435), here the scene is treated in a more traditional way, with a horizontal development that has been related to the composition of the Crucifixion with the saints which is in the chapter house of the convent. Even the background with chipped rocks is drawn from tradition. Various poses of the characters are also found in some scenes from the predella of the San Marco Altarpiece.

The light is diaphanous and crystalline and gives rise to a soft and delicate colour scheme which, together with the wealth of characters, is one of the best characteristics of the work.

The work is often seen as leading to Gozzoli's later commission and more famous painting of the same subject in the Magi Chapel in the Palazzo Medici.
