= Alesso (disambiguation) =

Alesso (born Alessandro Lindblad, 1991) is a Swedish DJ and electronic dance music producer.

Alesso may also refer to:

- Alesso di Benozzo (1473–1528), Italian painter
- Alesso Baldovinetti (1427–1499), Italian early Renaissance painter
