= Basilica di San Marco =

Basilica di San Marco may refer to:

- Basilica di San Marco (Florence)
- Basilica di San Marco (Rome)
- Basilica di San Marco (Venice)
