= Cosimo de' Medici's cell =

Cosimo de' Medici had two friar's cells reserved for him in the Dominican convent of San Marco in Florence. This was intended as a place for personal retreat and was used as a guest room for other important guests.

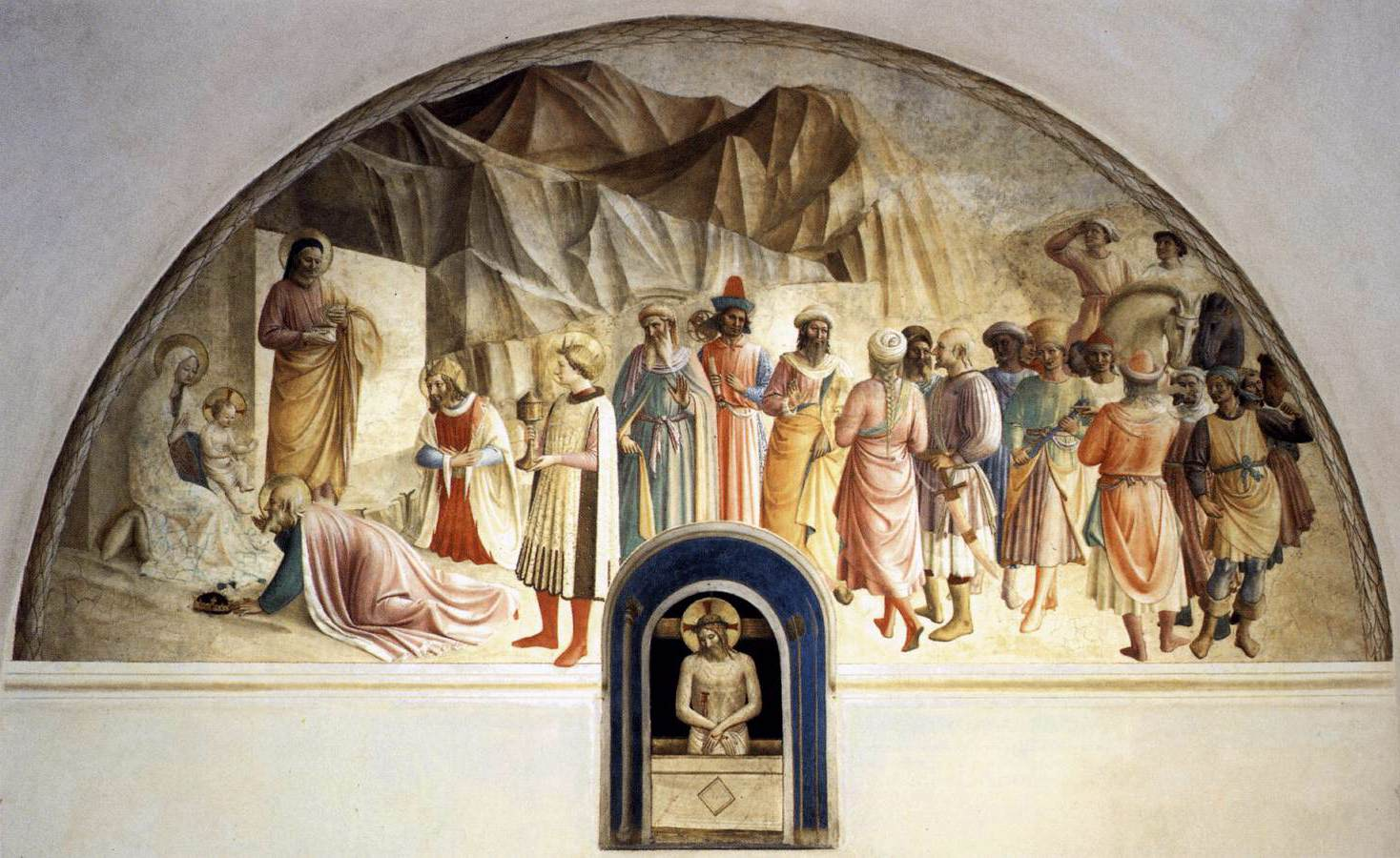
Adoration of the Magi by Fra Angelico in San Marco (1438–1446)

Cosimo de' Medici was not a member of the Dominican Order, but had a claim to the cell due to his patronage of the monastery.

Pope Eugenius IV slept in the cell the night of Epiphany 1443 when he came to consecrate the new church.

The paintings in the double cell differ in some respects from those in the other cells. The pictorial language is more descriptive and the colours are brighter and the composition is more complex. Compared to the other cells the contribution from Fra Angelico is less and those of his assistants, particularly Benozzo Gozzoli, is greater.

The cell's largest painting is the Adoration of the Magi.
