= Benozzo Gozzoli =

Italian painter (c. 1421–1497)

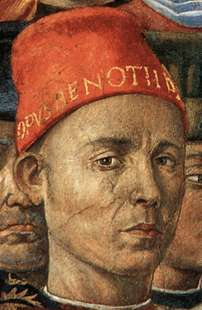
- Self-portrait from fresco Procession of the Magi
- Born: Benozzo di Lese c. 1421; Sant'Ilario a Colombano, Republic of Florence
- Died: 4 October 1497 (aged 75–76); Pistoia, Republic of Florence
- Known for: Painting, fresco
- Movement: Early Renaissance

Benozzo Gozzoli (pronounced [beˈnɔttso ˈɡɔddzoli, – ˈɡɔttsoli]; born Benozzo di Lese; (Note: The nickname Gozzoli does not appear in any documents; Giorgio Vasari recorded it in his second edition of the Vite (1568).) c. 1421 – 4 October 1497) was an Italian Renaissance painter from Florence. A pupil of Fra Angelico, Gozzoli is best known for a series of murals in the Magi Chapel of the Palazzo Medici-Riccardi, depicting festive, vibrant processions with fine attention to detail and a pronounced International Gothic influence. The chapel's fresco cycle reveals a new Renaissance interest in nature with its realistic depiction of landscapes and vivid human portraits. Gozzoli is considered one of the most prolific fresco painters of his generation. While he was mainly active in Tuscany, he also worked in Umbria and Rome.

== Biography ==
=== Apprenticeship ===
Gozzoli was born Benozzo di Lese, son of a tailor, in the village of Sant'Ilario a Colombano around 1421. His family moved to nearby Florence in 1427. According to the 16th century Italian biographer Giorgio Vasari, Gozzoli was a pupil and assistant of Fra Angelico in the early part of his career.

Gozzoli assisted Fra Angelico in the execution of fresco decorations in the dormitory cells of the Convent of San Marco in Florence. Established contributions here include The Adoration of the Magi in Cosimo de' Medici's cell and the Women at the Tomb in a larger depiction of the Resurrection of Christ in cell 8. Like many other Early Renaissance painters, Benozzo was initially trained as a goldsmith as well as a painter.

Between 1444 and 1447, he was therefore able to collaborate with Lorenzo Ghiberti on the famous Gates of Paradise of the Florence Baptistery.

On 23 May 1447, Benozzo was with Fra Angelico in Rome, to where they were called by Pope Eugene IV to carry out fresco decorations in a chapel in the Vatican Palace. This chapel was later demolished, so nothing of these works remains. He then accompanied Fra Angelico to Umbria, where they decorated a chapel vault in the Chapel of the Madonna di San Brizio in the Orvieto Cathedral.

Due to political complications in the city, they completed only two of the four vault webs and were again summoned to the Vatican, where the pair worked for Nicholas V in the Niccoline Chapel until June 1448. Gozzoli is assumed to have made significant contributions in the chapel's frescoes. Furthermore, the attribution of a 1449 Madonna and Child Giving Blessings in the church of Santa Maria sopra Minerva is disputed between Gozzoli and Fra Angelico. In Rome, Gozzoli also executed a fresco of St Anthony of Padua in the Basilica of Santa Maria in Aracoeli.

Both Fra Angelico and Lorenzo Ghiberti were to influence much of Gozzoli's work for the rest of his life. From Ghiberti he learned precision in depicting the finest details and how to illustrate a story vividly, while from Fra Angelico, he took his bright color palette, transferring it to the art of fresco painting.

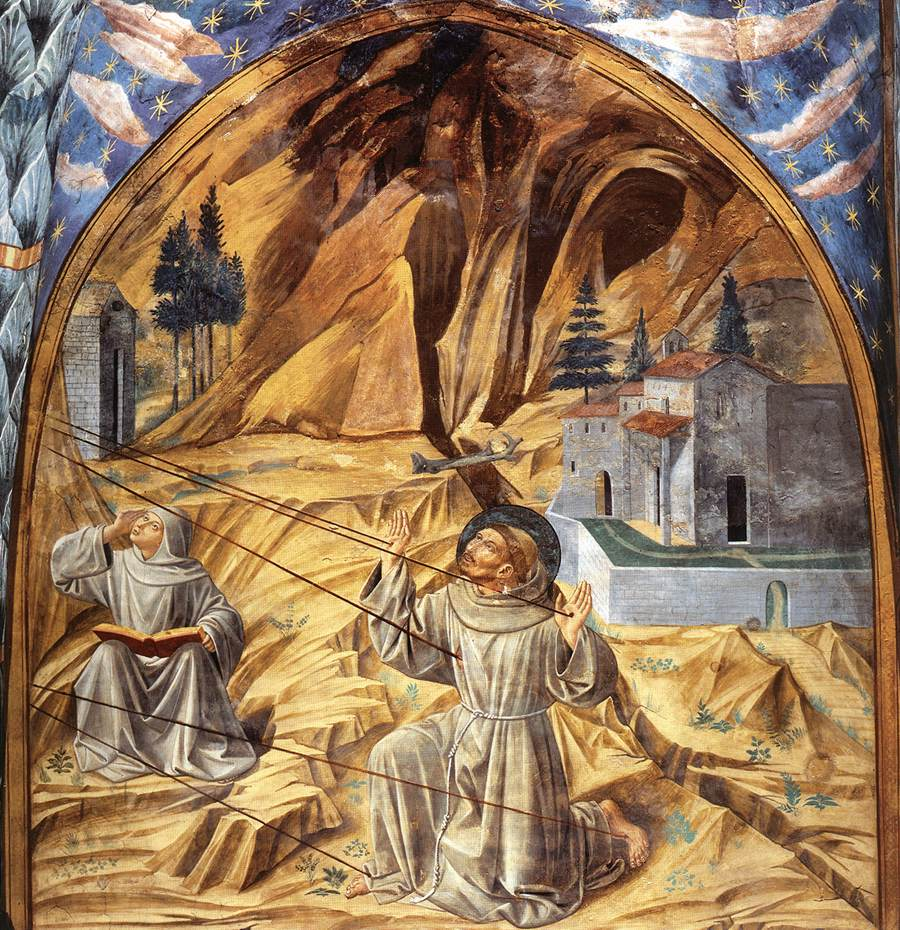
Scenes from the Life of St Francis, Museum Complex of San Francesco, Montefalco, 1452

=== In Umbria ===
In 1449, Gozzoli left Fra Angelico and moved to Umbria. In the hilltown of Narni there is an Annunciation from 1450, signed OPU[S] BENOT[I] DE FLORENT[IA]. In the monastery of San Fortunato, near Montefalco, Gozzoli painted a Madonna and Child between St. Francis and St. Bernardine of Siena, and three other works. One of these, the altarpiece Madonna of the Girdle, is now in the Vatican Museums and shows the affinity of Benozzo's early style to Fra Angelico's.

In 1450, Gozzoli received his first major independent commission from the monastery of S. Francesco in Montefalco. There, he filled the choir chapel with three registers of episodes from the life of St Francis of Assisi and various accessories, including portrait heads of Dante, Petrarch and Giotto. These works were completed in 1452, and are still marked by the style of Angelico, crossed here and there with a more distinctly Giottesque influence. In the same church, in the chapel of Saint Jerome, there is a fresco by Gozzoli of the Virgin and Saints, the Crucifixion and other subjects.

Gozzoli probably remained at Montefalco (with an interval at Viterbo) until 1456, employing Pier Antonio Mezzastris as an assistant. Then, he went to Perugia and painted a Virgin and Saints that is now in the local academy.

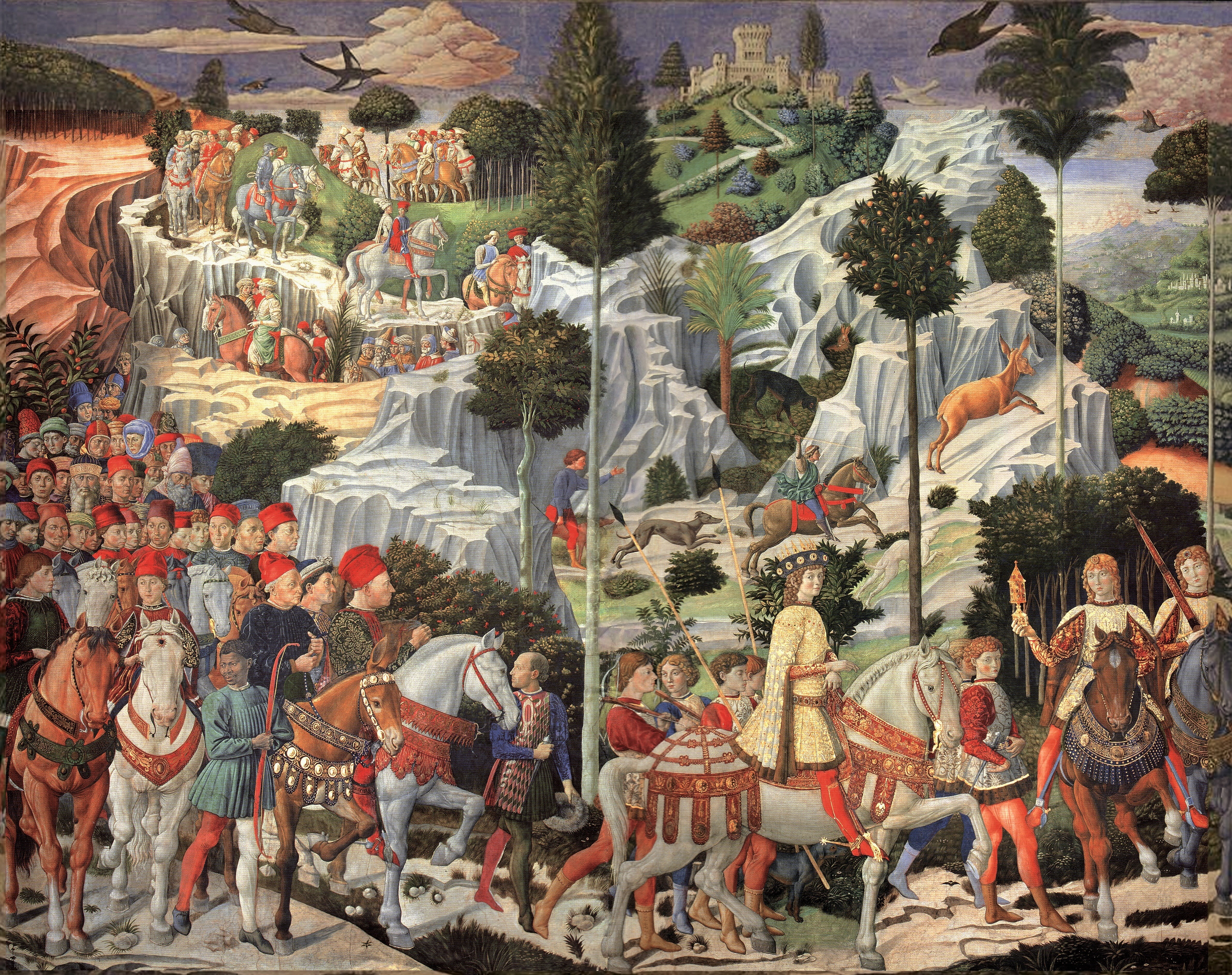
Journey of the Magi (East Wall), Magi Chapel of Palazzo Medici, Florence, 1459–1461

=== Return to Florence ===
That same year, Benozzo returned to his native city Florence, the epicenter of Quattrocento art. Between 1459 and 1461, Gozzoli painted what may be considered his most important works, the frescoes in the Magi Chapel of the Palazzo Medici-Riccardi. There, in his Journey of the Magi to Bethlehem and Angels in Adoration, he mastered a combination of complexity and subtlety, portraying a wealthy scene that encompasses realistic depictions of nature and vivid human portraits. In his Journey of the Magi, Gozzoli incorporated numerous portraits of his Medici patrons, their allies and prominent contemporary figures. Furthermore, he also included his self-portrait in the procession, with his name written around the rim of his cap.

His frescoes in the Magi Chapel brought Gozzoli a great amount of fame and ensured him of new important commissions. One of these was an altarpiece for the Confraternity of the Purification in Florence, originally housed in the Convent of San Marco. The Virgin and Child Enthroned among Angels and Saints that he produced between 1461 and 1462 for this occasion is now housed in the National Gallery, London.

=== Late years in Tuscany ===
==== San Gimignano ====
In 1463, likely in fear of the plague, Gozzoli left Florence for San Gimignano, where he executed some extensive works. Most prominent of these is his seventeen-panel fresco cycle on The Life of St Augustine, covering the entire apsidal chapel in the church of Sant'Agostino. In that same church Gozzoli also completed a composition of St. Sebastian Protecting the City from the Plague, in which he depicted St. Sebastian fully clothed and unhurt, thereby going against iconographic canon. In 1465, at the town's heart in the Collegiate Church of Santa Maria Assunta, Gozzoli furthermore painted a fresco of the Martyrdom of Sebastian. He stayed in San Gimignano until 1467, completing some further works in the city and its vicinity.

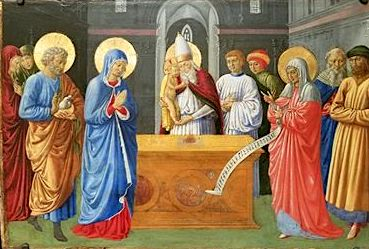
Purification of the Virgin, 1460–1461 (Philadelphia Museum of Art)

==== Pisa ====
In 1469, Gozzoli moved to Pisa and began working on his most extensive commission: the vast series of mural paintings in the Campo Santo edifice of Pisa. There, he depicted twenty-four subjects from the Old Testament, ranging from the Invention of Wine by Noah to the Visit of the Queen of Sheba to Solomon. He was contracted to paint three subjects per year for about ten ducats each. It appears, however, that this contract was not strictly adhered to, for the actual rate of painting was only three pictures in two years. Perhaps the great multitude of figures and accessories was accepted as a set-off against the slower rate of production.

By January 1470 he had executed the fresco of Noah and his Family, followed by the Curse of Ham, the Building of the Tower of Babel (which contains portraits of Cosimo de' Medici, the young Lorenzo, Angelo Poliziano and others), the Destruction of Sodom, the Victory of Abraham, the Marriages of Rebecca and of Rachel, the Life of Moses, etc. In the Cappella Ammannati, facing a gate of the Camposanto, he also painted an Adoration of the Magi, wherein appears a portrait of himself.

All this enormous mass of work, in which Benozzo was probably assisted by Zanobi Machiavelli, was performed, in addition to several other pictures during his stay in Pisa (including the Glory of St. Thomas Aquinas, now in the Louvre), in sixteen years, lasting up to 1485. This is the latest date which can with certainty be assigned to any work by his hand. Gozzoli died in Pistoia in 1497, perhaps of a pestilence.

In 1478, as a token of their regard, the Pisan authorities had given him a tomb in the Campo Santo. He likewise had a house of his own in Pisa, and houses and land in Florence.

== Trivia ==
- The painters Francesco, Gerolamo, and Alesso di Benozzo were his sons and assisted him on various commissions.
- The Master of the Small Figures identified by Longhi is the same painter called Alunno di Benozzo (pupil of Benozzo) by Berenson. The name is based on stylistic grounds.

== Works ==
- Women at the Tomb (1440–1441) – Fresco, San Marco, Florence
- Adoration of the Magi (1440–1441) – Fresco, San Marco, Florence
- Gates of Paradise (1444–1447, collaboration) – Gilded bronze doors, Museo dell'Opera del Duomo, Florence
- Chapel of the Madonna di San Brizio (1447, collaboration) – Fresco, Orvieto Cathedral, Orvieto
- Niccoline Chapel (1447–1449, collaboration) – Fresco, Apostolic Palace, Vatican City
- The Virgin and Child with Angels (1447–1450) – Tempera on wood, 29.2 x 21.6 cm, National Gallery, London
- Madonna and Child Giving Blessings (1449) – Tempera on silk on a wooden mount, 254 x 130 cm, Santa Maria sopra Minerva, Rome
- St. Anthony of Padua (1450) – Panel, Santa Maria in Aracoeli, Rome
- Madonna and Child between St Francis and St Bernardine of Siena (1450) – Fresco, San Fortunato, Montefalco
- St Fortunatus Enthroned (1450) – Fresco, 200 x 110 cm, San Fortunato, Montefalco
- Madonna and Child (1450) – Fresco, 250 x 135 cm, San Fortunato, Montefalco
- Madonna of the Girdle (1450–1452) – Tempera on panel, 133 x 164 cm, Pinacoteca Vaticana, Vatican City
- Madonna and Child Surrounded by Saints (1452) – Fresco, Cappella di San Gerolamo, San Francesco, Montefalco
- The Departure of St Jerome from Antioch (1452) – Fresco, Cappella di San Gerolamo, San Francesco, Montefalco
- St Jerome Pulling a Thorn from a Lion's Paw (1452) – Fresco, Cappella di San Gerolamo, San Francesco, Montefalco
- Madonna and Child with Sts Francis and Bernardine, and Fra Jacopo (c. 1452) – Tempera on panel, 34 x 54 cm, Kunsthistorisches Museum, Vienna
- Madonna and Child with Sts John the Baptist, Peter, Jerome, and Paul (1456) – Tempera on panel, 122 x 212 cm, Galleria Nazionale dell'Umbria, Perugia
- Procession of the Magi (1459–1460) – Frescoes, Magi Chapel, Palazzo Medici Riccardi, Florence
- Madonna and Child (c. 1460) – Tempera on panel, 84.8 x 50.6 cm, Detroit Institute of Arts, Detroit
- The Virgin and Child Enthroned among Angels and Saints (1461–1462) – Tempera on panel, 161.9 x 170.2 cm, National Gallery, London
- St. Dominic Reuscitates Napoleone Orsini (1461) – Tempera on panel, 25 x 35 cm, Pinacoteca di Brera, Milan
- Fall of Simon Magus (1461–1462) – Tempera on panel, 24 x 35,5 cm, Royal Collection, Hampton Court Palace, London
- The Dance of Salome (1461–1462) – Tempera on panel, 23.8 x 34.3 cm, National Gallery of Art, Washington, D.C.
- Histories of St. Augustine (1464–1465) – Fresco cycle, Sant'Agostino, San Gimignano
  - Four Evangelists (1464–1465) – Fresco, Sant'Agostino, San Gimignano
  - Saints (1464–1465) – Frescoes, Sant'Agostino, San Gimignano
  - St. Sebastian Intercessor (1464–1466) – Fresco, 527 x 248 cm, Sant'Agostino, San Gimignano
- Martyrdom of St Sebastian (1465) – Tempera on panel, 525 x 378 cm, Collegiate Church, San Gimignano
- Madonna and Child between Sts. Andrew and Prosper (Madonna dell'Umiltà; 1466) – Tempera on panel, 137 x 138 cm, Museo Civico, San Gimignano
- Mystical Marriage of St. Catherine (1466) – Tempera on panel, 90 x 50 cm, Palazzo Gazzoli, Pinacoteca Comunale, Terni
- Triumph of St. Thomas Aquinas (1471) – Tempera on panel, 230 x 102 cm, Louvre, Paris
- The Vintage and Drunkenness of Noah (1469–1484) – Fresco, Campo Santo, Pisa
- Saints with Kneeling Donors (1481) – Metropolitan Museum of Art, New York
- Histories of the Holy Virgin, tabernacle with the Madonna della Tosse (1484) – Transferred frescoes, Museo Benozzo Gozzoli di Castelfiorentino
- Deposition of Christ (1491) – Oil on canvas, 180 x 300 cm, Museo Horne, Florence

=== Gallery of works ===
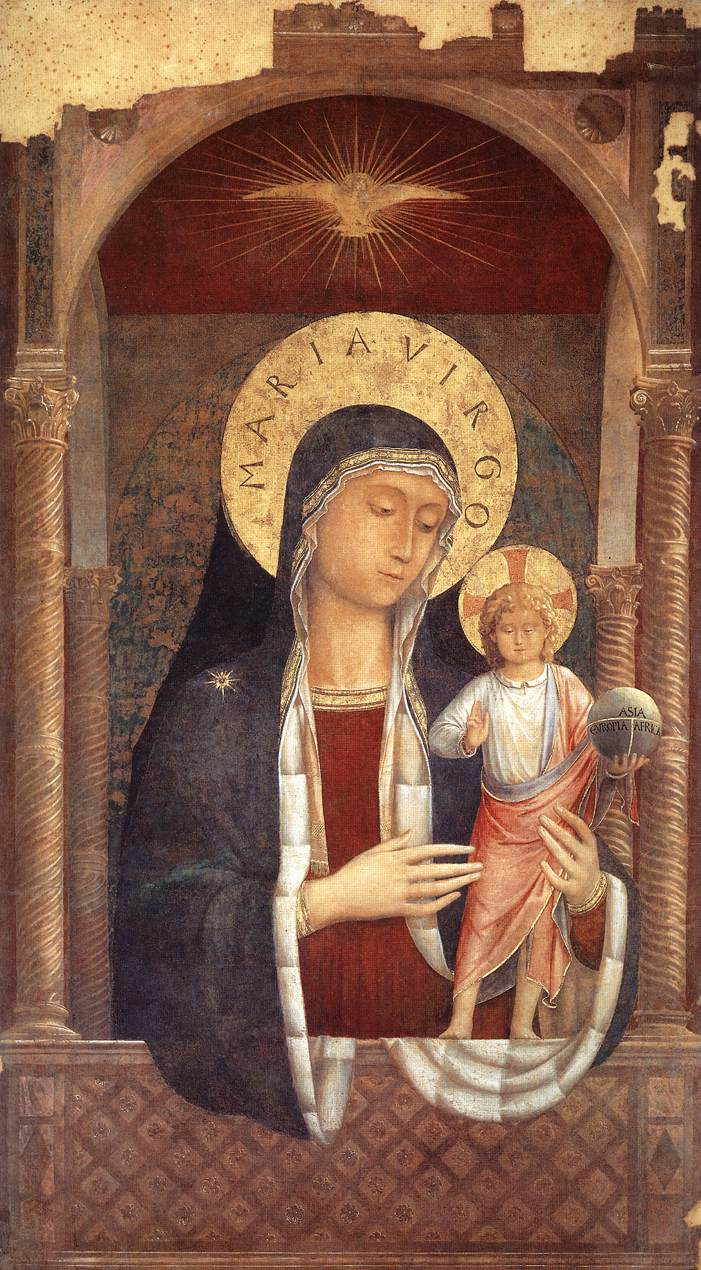
Madonna and Child Giving Blessings, 1449, Santa Maria sopra Minerva, Rome (also attributed to Fra Angelico)

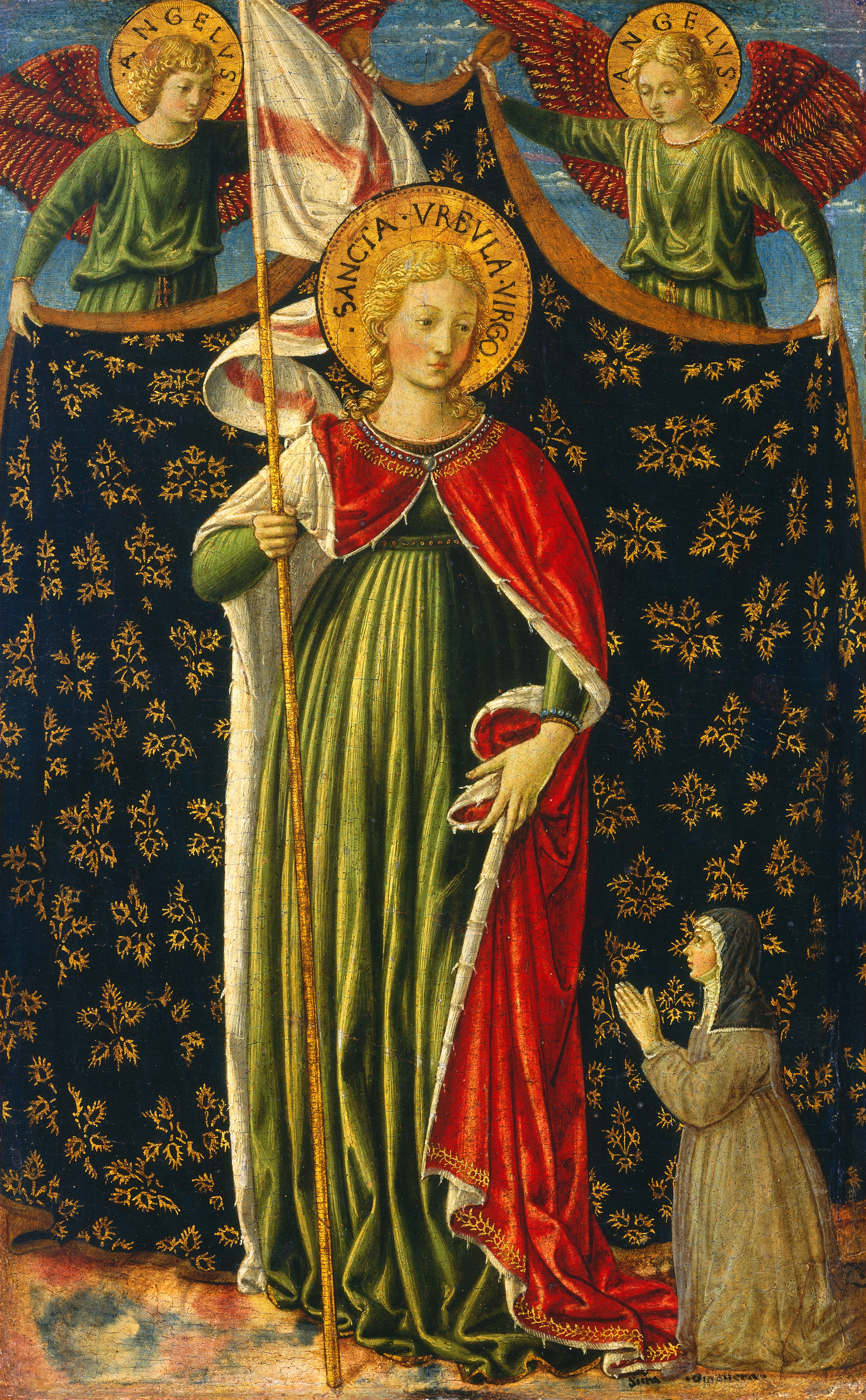
St. Ursula, 1455–1460, National Gallery of Art, Washington

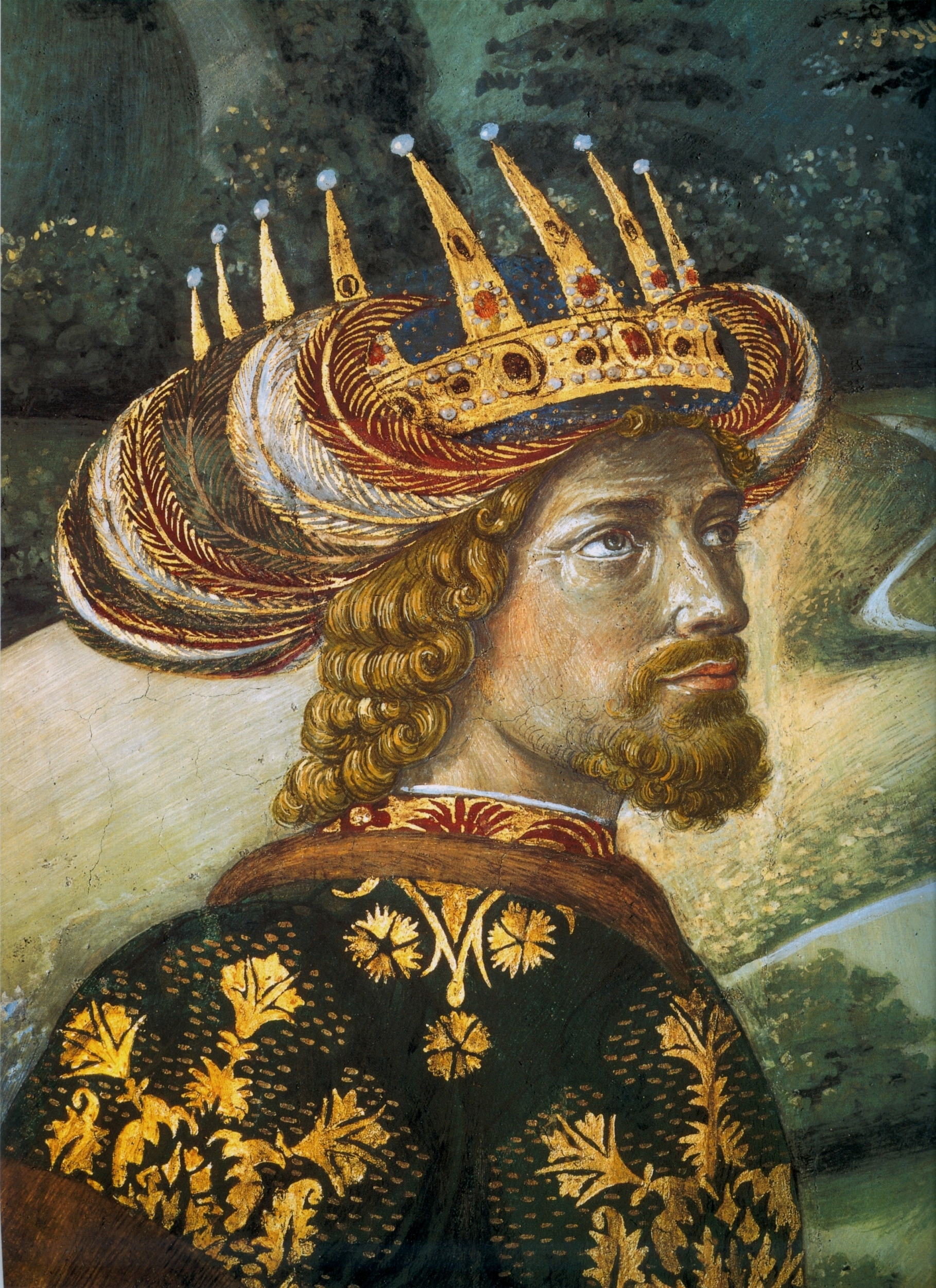
The middle king in the Magi Chapel is believed to represent John VIII, 1459–1461, Palazzo Medici, Florence

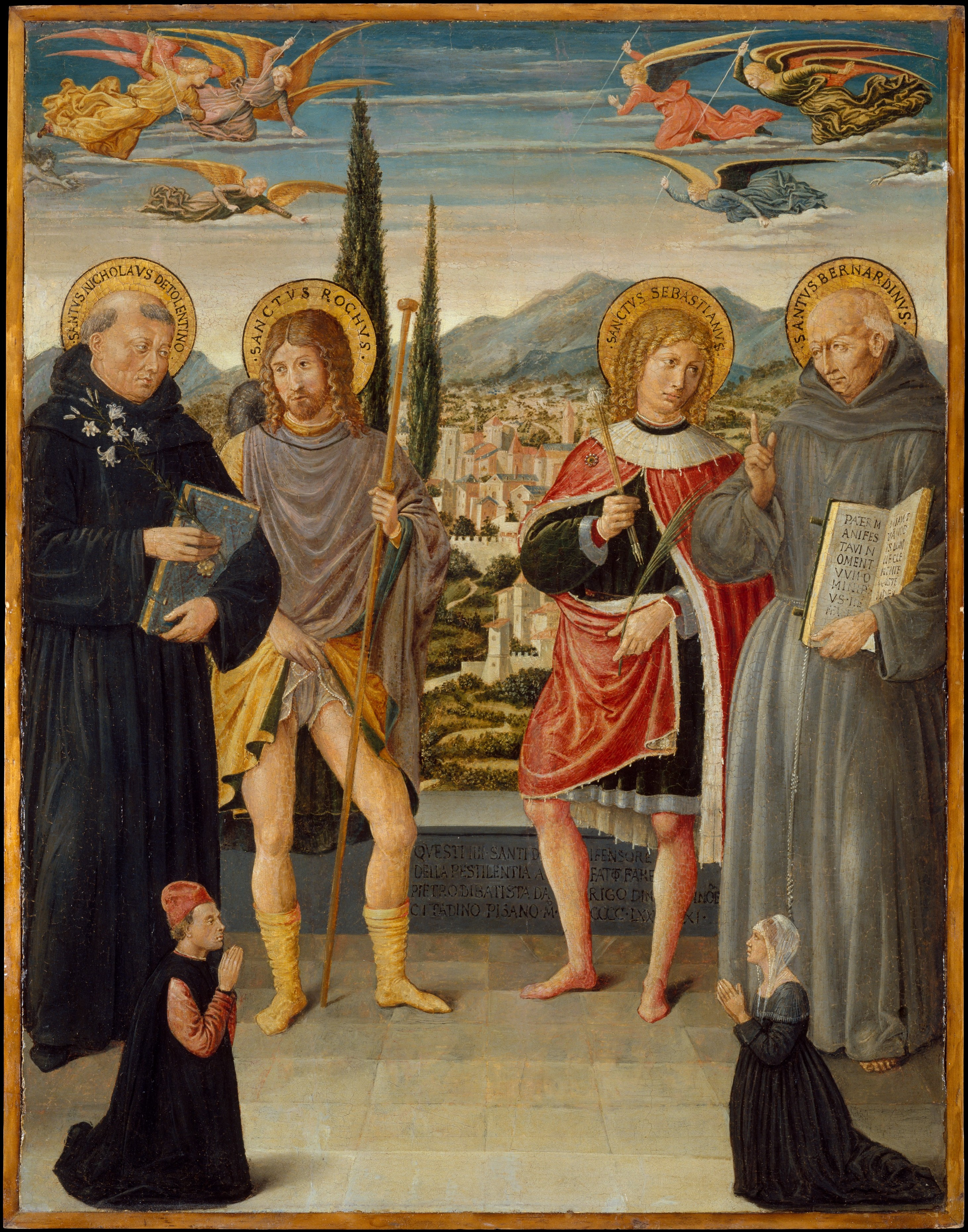
Saints with Kneeling Donors, 1481, Metropolitan Museum of Art, New York

== Sources ==
- Roger J. Crum, "Roberto Martelli, the Council of Florence, and the Medici Palace Chapel", Zeitschrift für Kunstgeschichte, 59 (1996).
- Dale Kent, Cosimo de' Medici and the Florentine Renaissance. New Haven: Yale University Press, 2000.
- Franco Cardini, The Chapel of the Magi in Palazzo Medici. Florence: Mandragora, 2001.
- Gerardo de Simone, Cristina Borgioli (eds.). Benozzo Gozzoli a San Gimignano. Exhibition catalogue, Pinacoteca & Museo d’Arte Sacra, San Gimignano, 18 June–1 November 2016. Florence: Giunti, 2016.
