= Niccoline Chapel =

Chapel in the Apostolic Palace in Vatican City

Coordinates: 41°54′12.24″N 012°27′16.63″E

Ordination of St. Laurence
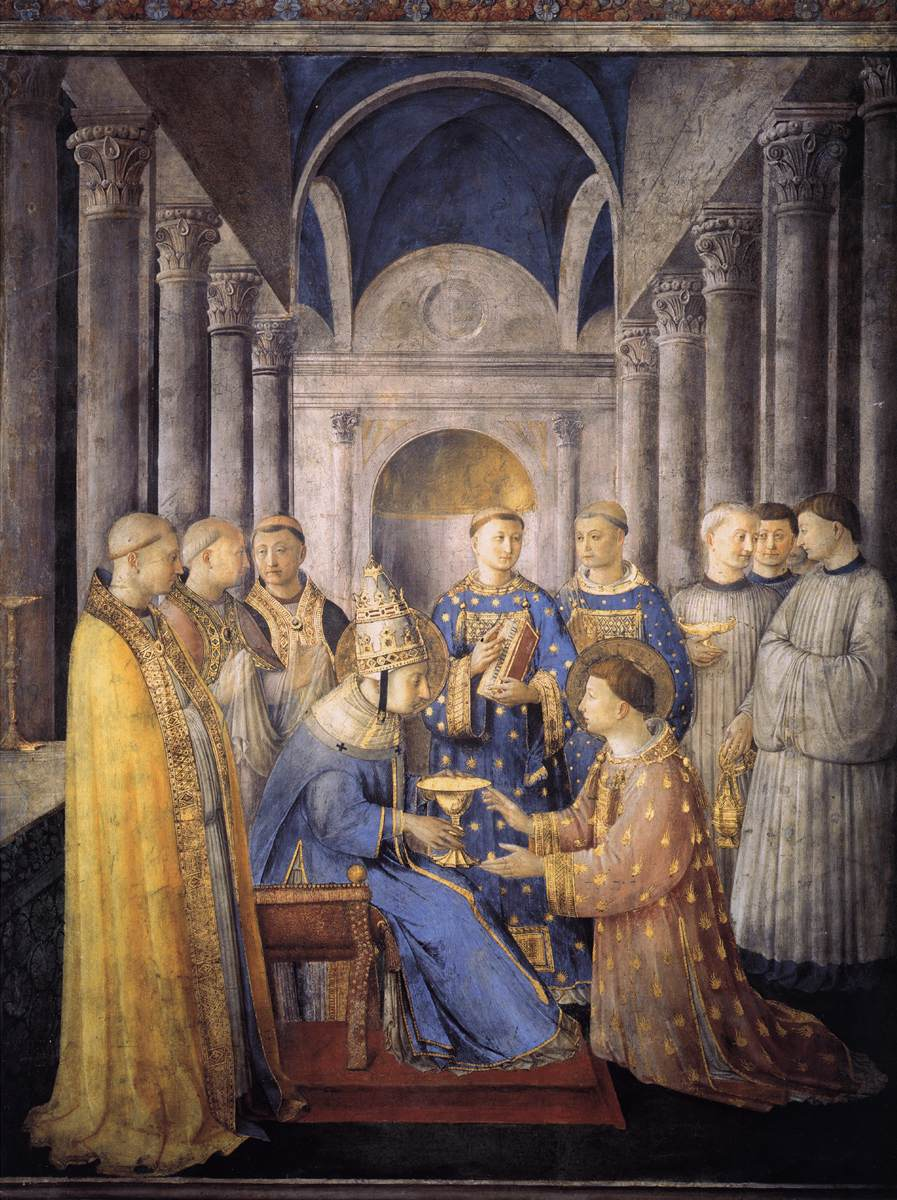
- Artist: Fra Angelico
- Year: 1447–1449
- Type: Fresco
- Dimensions: 271 cm × 197 cm (107 in × 78 in)

The Niccoline Chapel (Italian: Cappella Niccolina) is a chapel in the Apostolic Palace in Vatican City. It is especially notable for its fresco paintings by Fra Angelico (1447–1451) and his assistants, who may have executed much of the actual work. The name is derived from its patron, Pope Nicholas V, who had it built for use as his private chapel.

The chapel is located in the Tower of Innocent III, in the most ancient part of the Apostolic Palace. The walls were decorated by Fra Angelico with images of two of the earliest Christian martyrs; the upper level has Episodes from the Life of St. Stephen, and the lower one Scenes from the life of St. Laurence. The vault is painted blue, decorated with stars, and features figures of the Four Evangelists in the corners. The pilasters are decorated with the eight Doctors of the Church.

The chapel is not included in the usual tourist visit, but can be seen by special pre-booked groups.

== Frescos ==
Fra Angelico depicted a Deposition of Christ (the removal of Christ from the Cross) on the wall behind the altar, but it has been destroyed. However, his other works in the lunettes are well preserved.

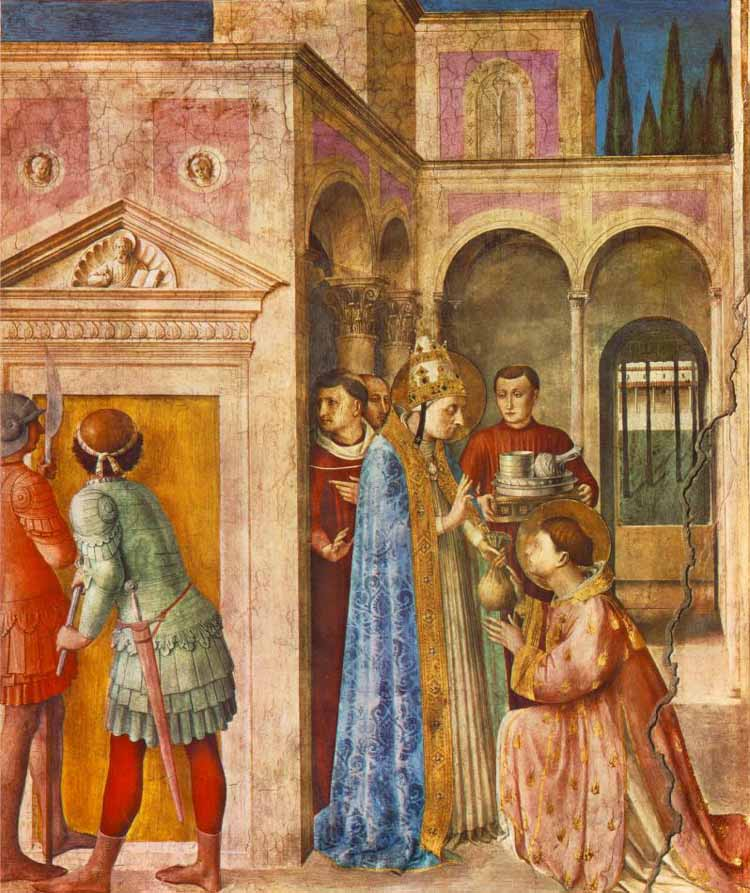
St. Lawrence Receiving the Treasures of the Church, 322 x 412 mm.

The scenes of St. Stephen follow the Biblical account in the Acts of the Apostles, while those of St. Laurence are patterned after the older cycles in the basilica of San Lorenzo fuori le Mura, where he is buried. Stephen was a Greek-speaking Jew, one of the first deacons named in Jerusalem by St. Peter – Ordination of St Stephen with St Stephen distributing Alms (lunette). His prayers (The Prayer of St. Stephen) earned him the hostility of his opponents in the city, who eventually stoned him to death in front of the city gate.

Laurence was a deacon (Ordination of St Laurence) to whom Pope Sixtus II had entrusted the Church's treasure in order to give it to the Roman emperor Valerian (St. Lawrence Receiving the Treasures of the Church). Lawrence instead divided it among the poor (St Laurence distributing Alms), an act for which he was martyred. The frescoes underline the similarities in the lives of the two figures: both were ordained deacons, both gave alms to the poor and both were martyred after a courageous declaration of faith. The choice of the two saints also shows the connection between the Churches of Jerusalem and the Rome.

The frescoes, full of fine architectural details, allude also to Nicholas V's desire to rebuild Rome as the new capital city of Christianity. The large walls in the Martyrdom of St. Stephen hint at the rebuilding of Rome's walls. Further, the schism in the Jewish community in Jerusalem can be compared to the Christian schism witnessed by Nicholas (who is portrayed in the frescoes as Pope Sixtus II).

Location in Vatican City

== Gallery ==
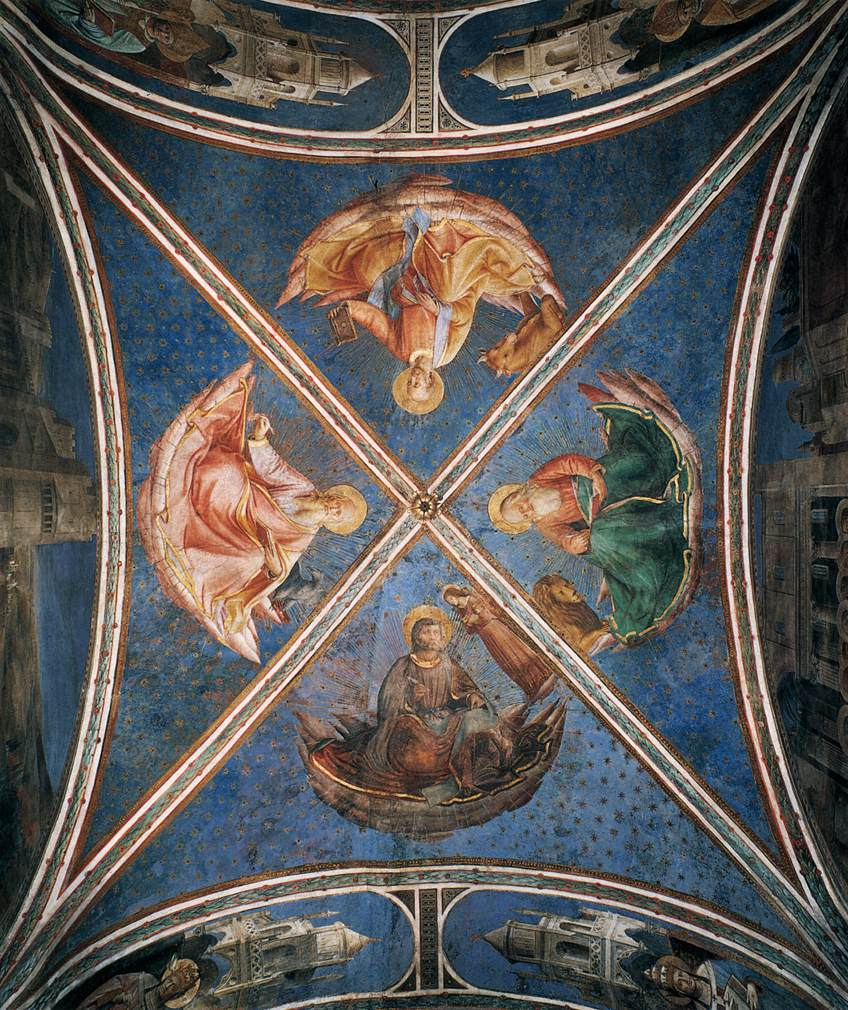
The vaulting and ceiling of the chapel

=== Left wall ===
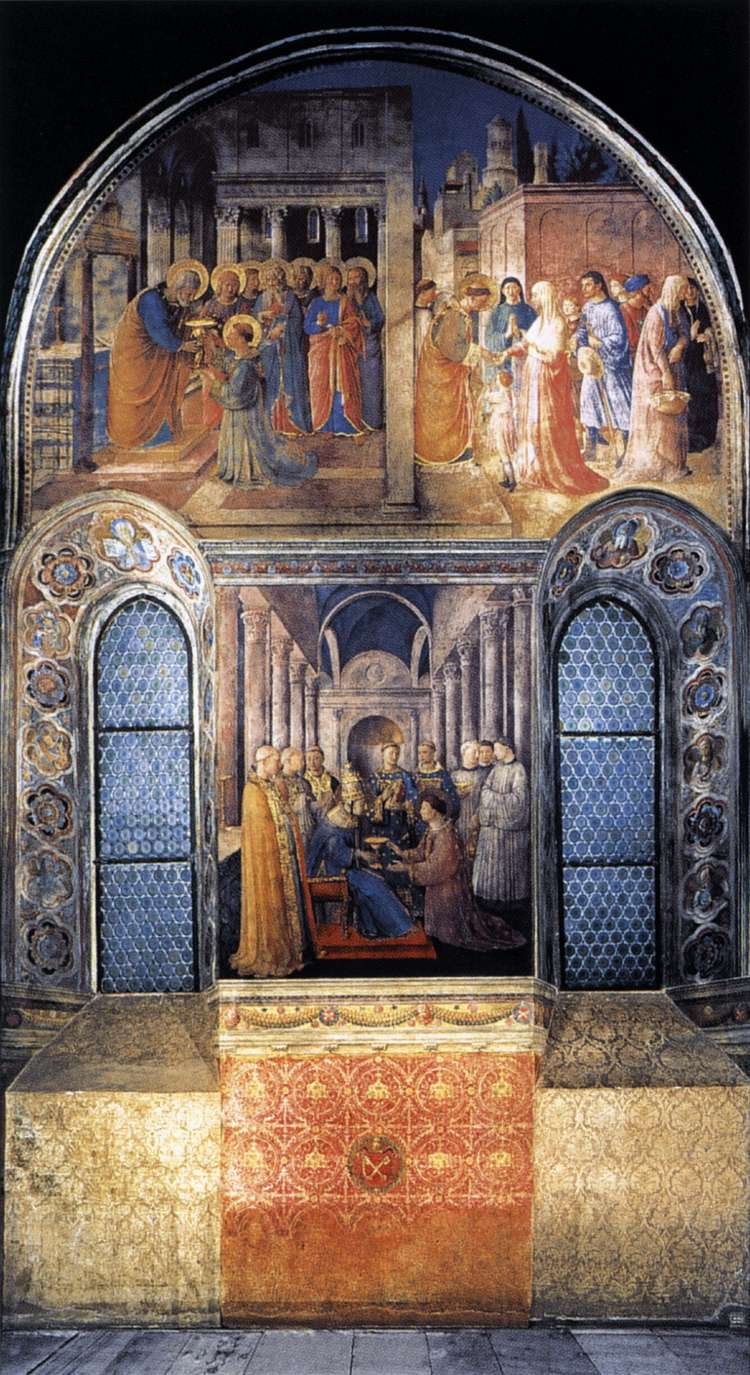

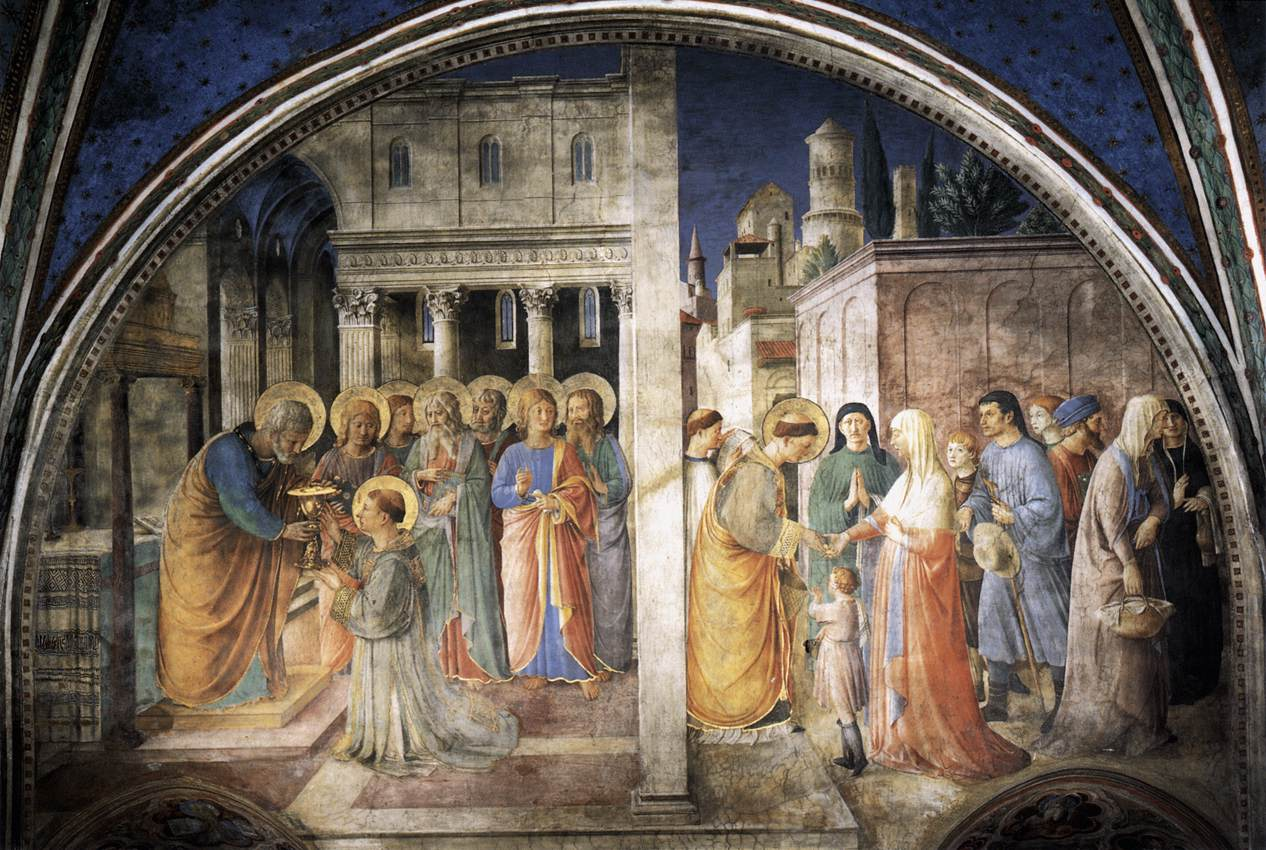

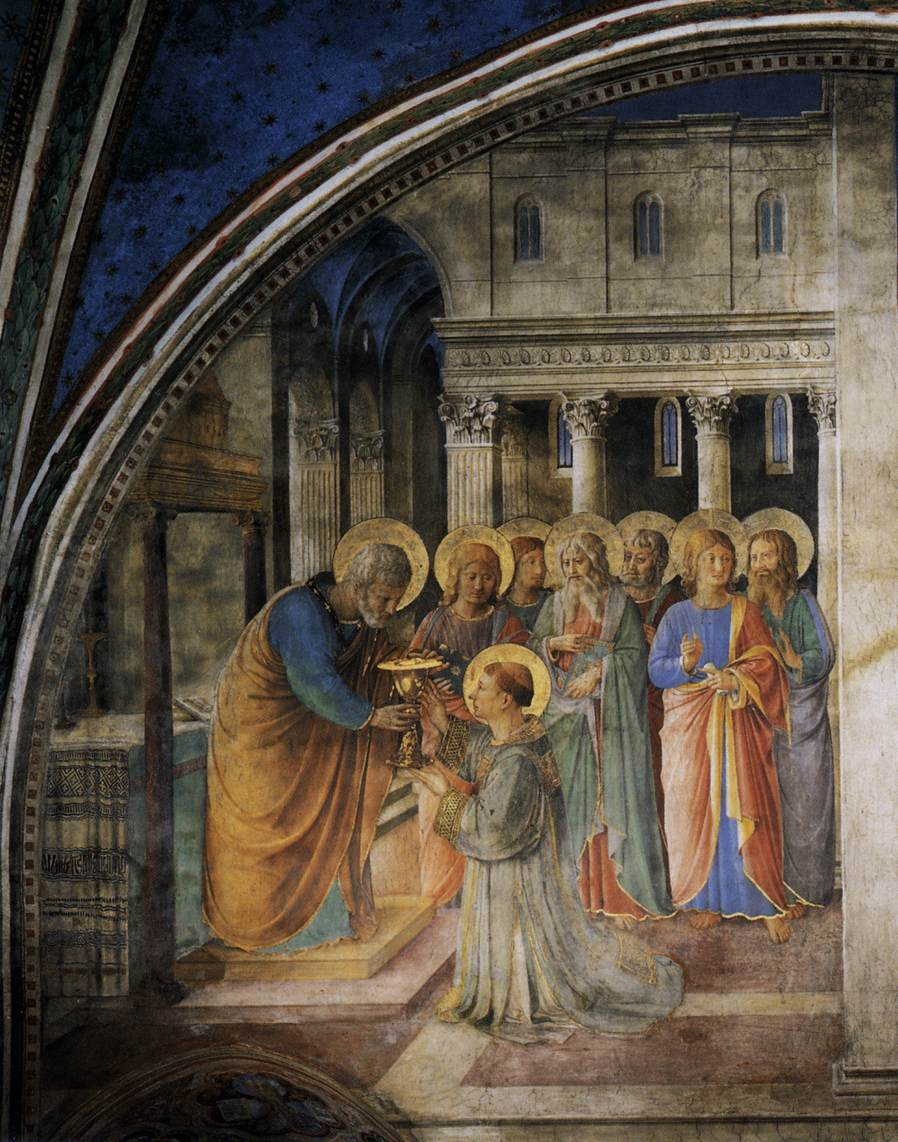

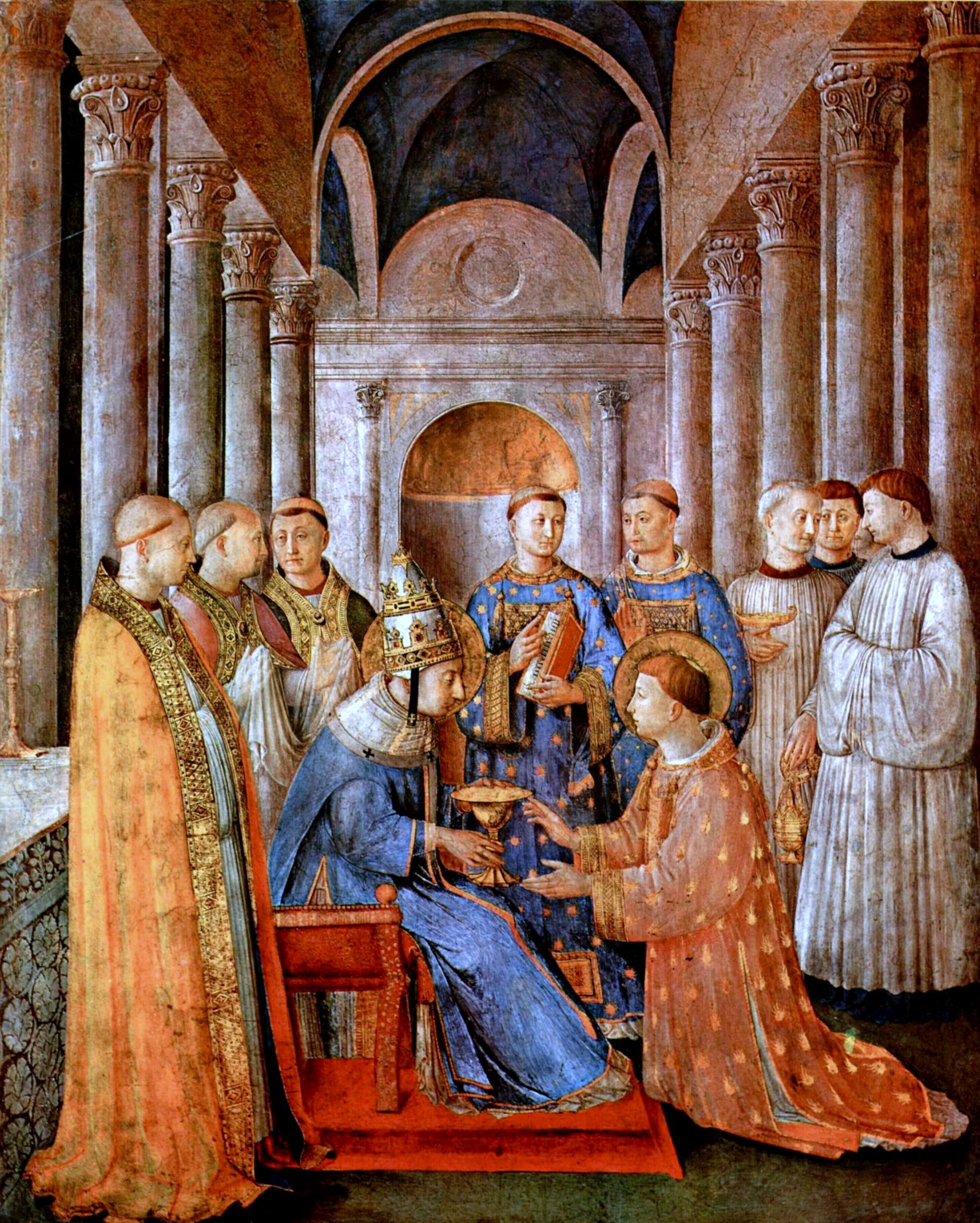

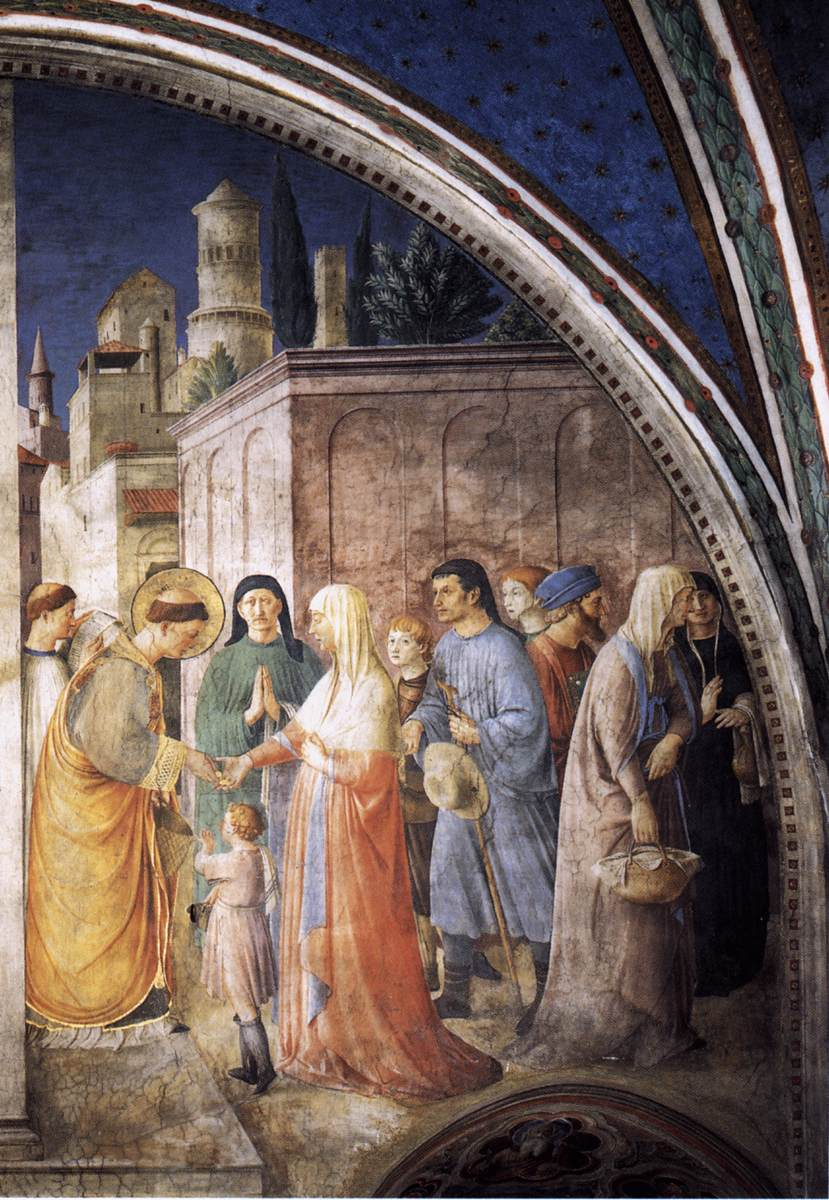

=== Centre wall ===
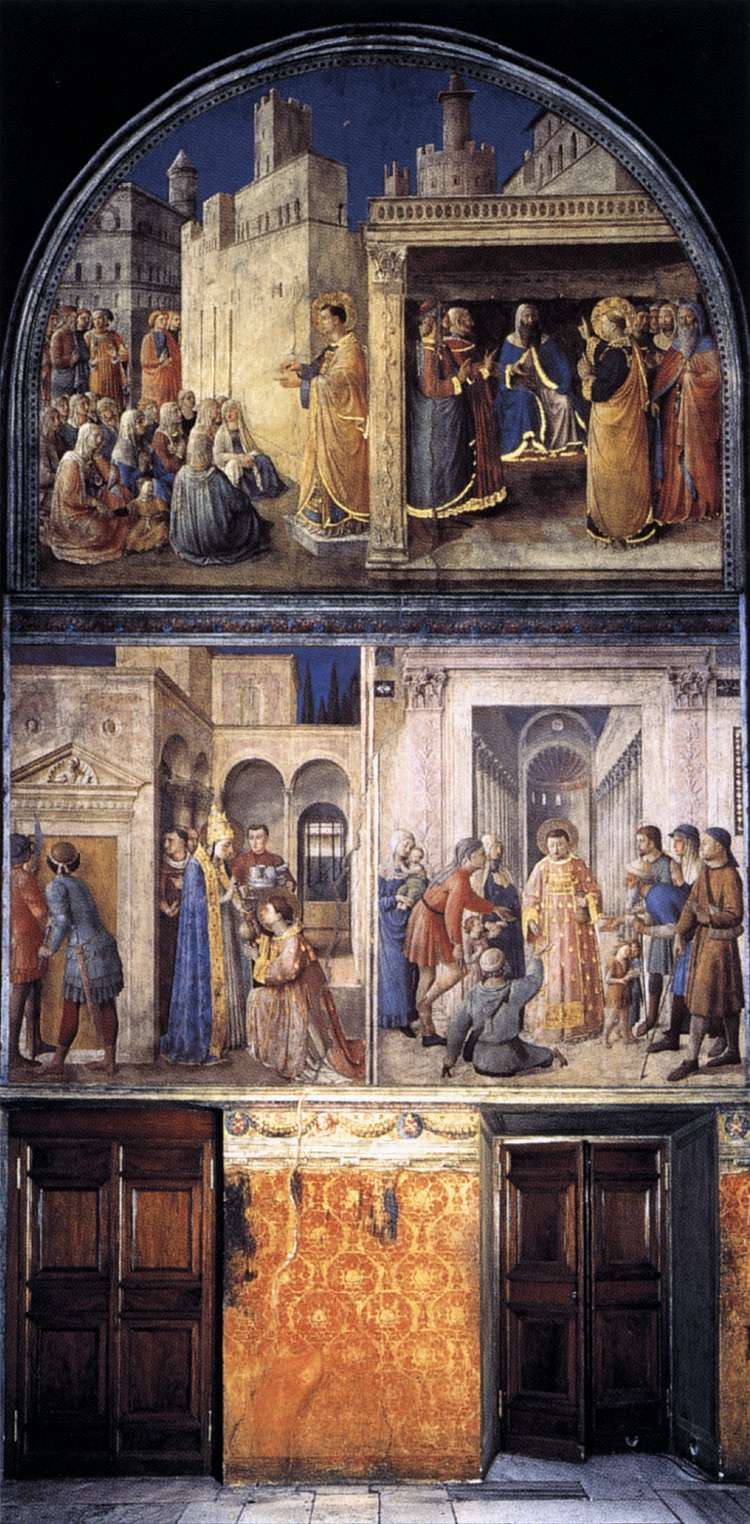

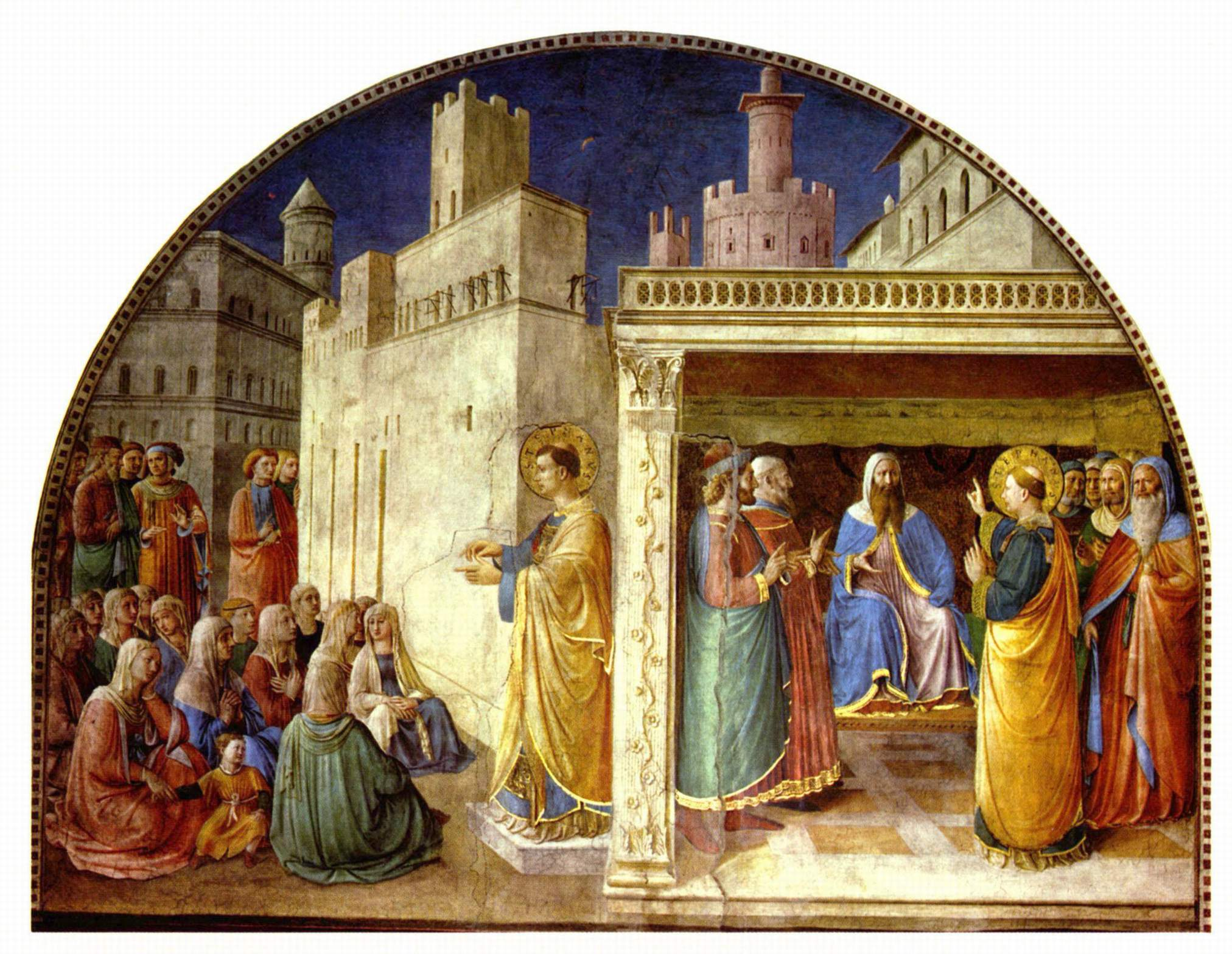

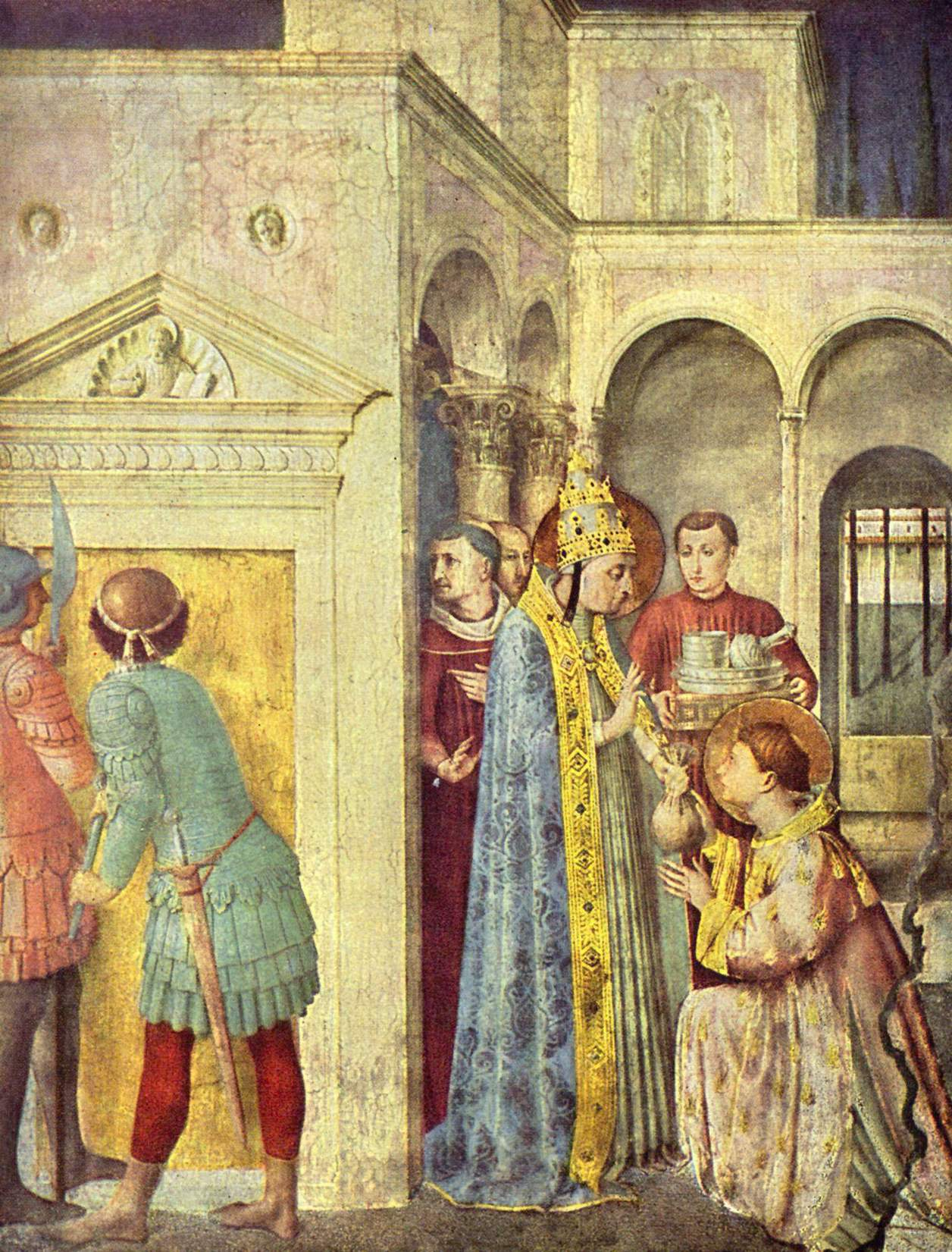

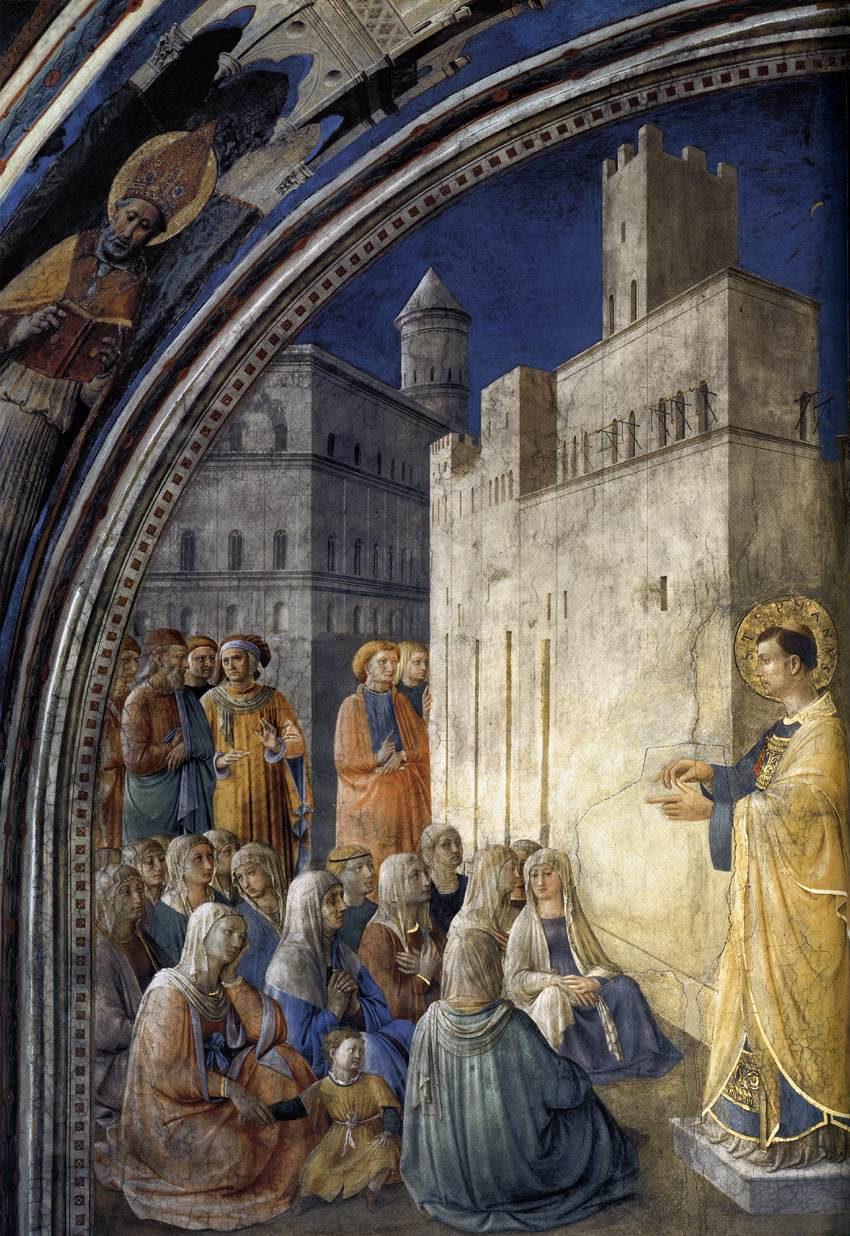

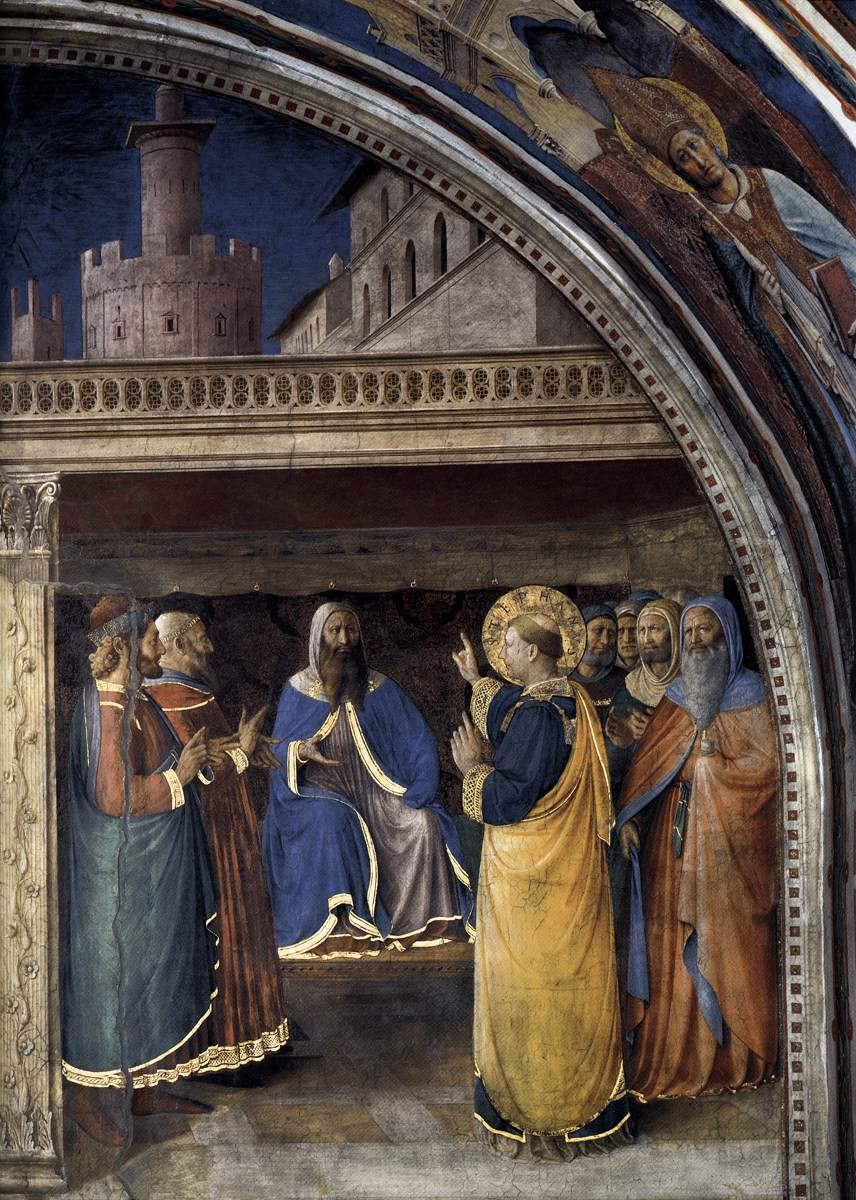

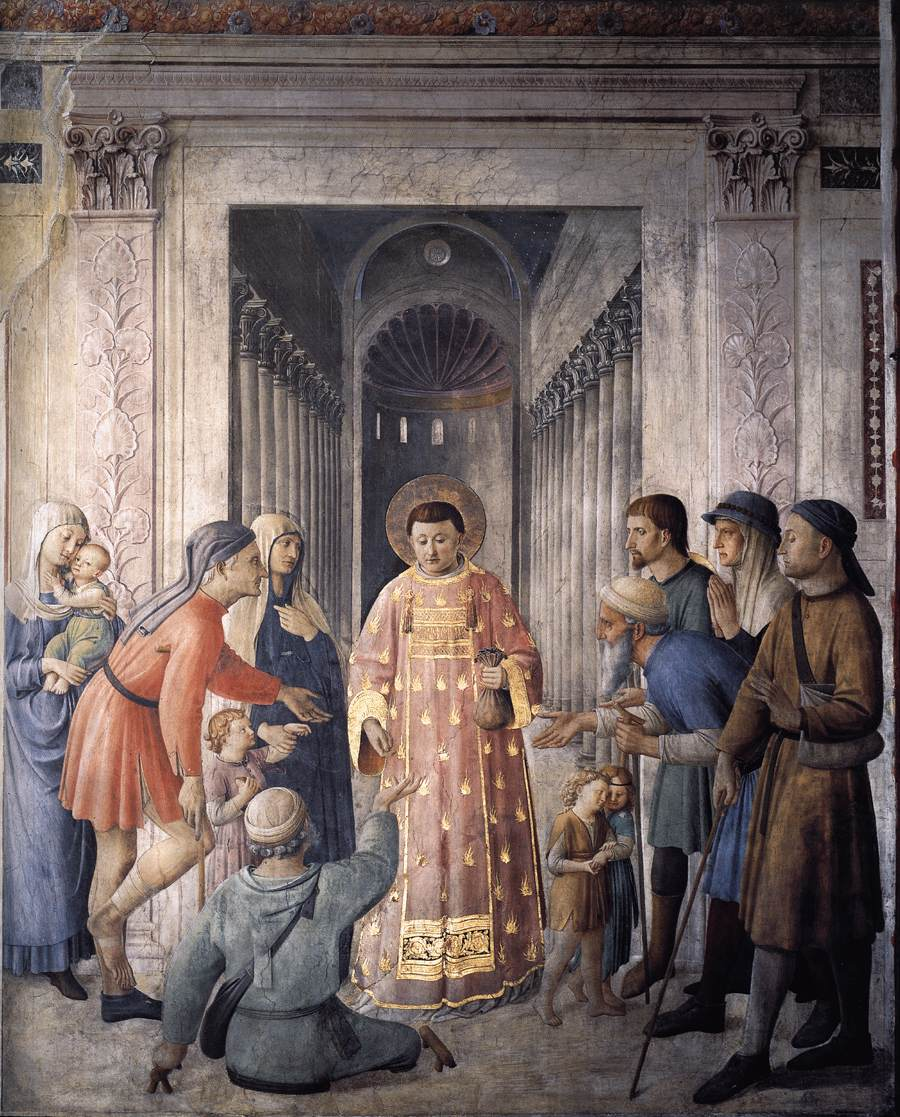

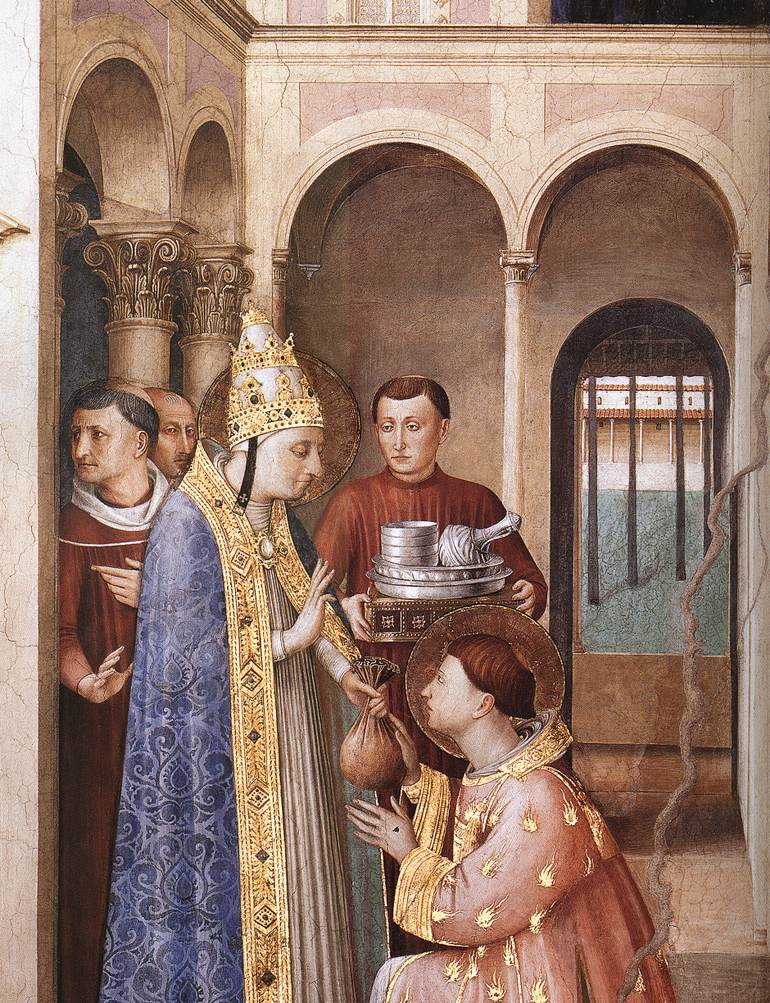

=== Right wall ===
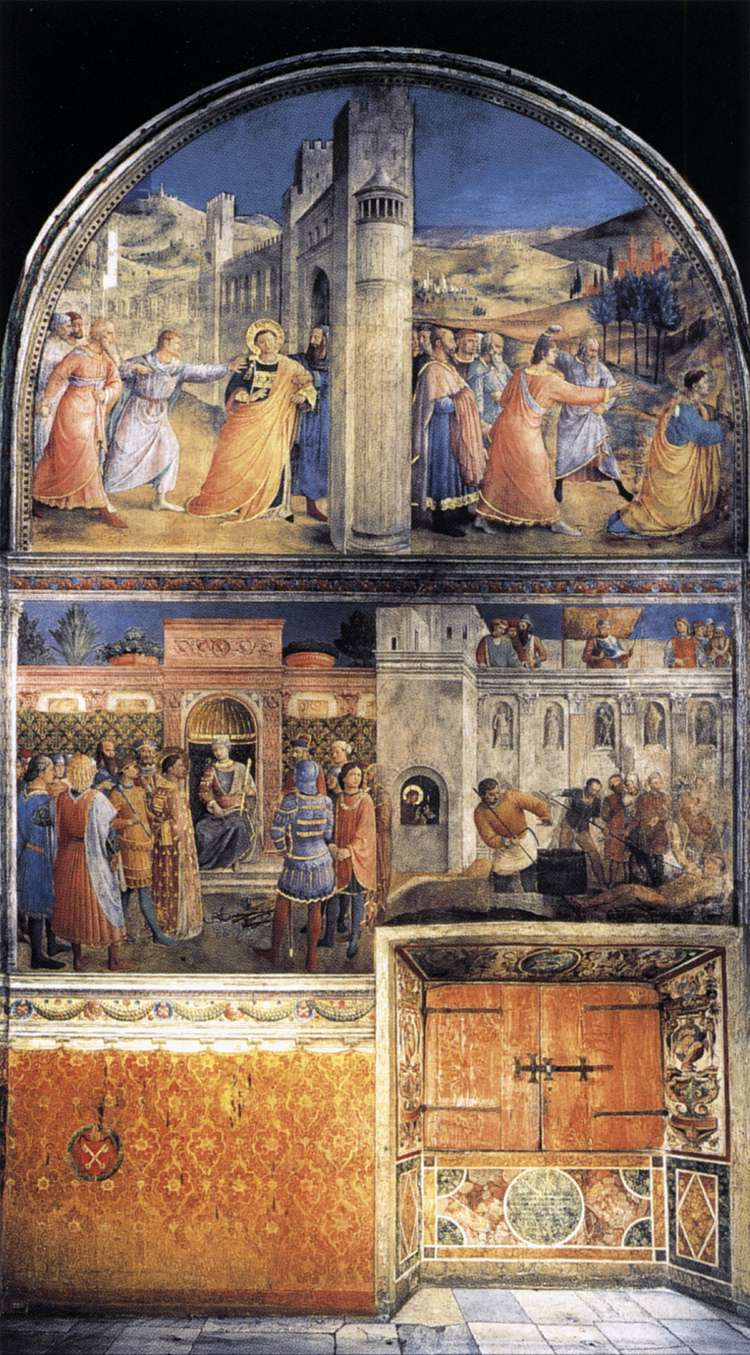

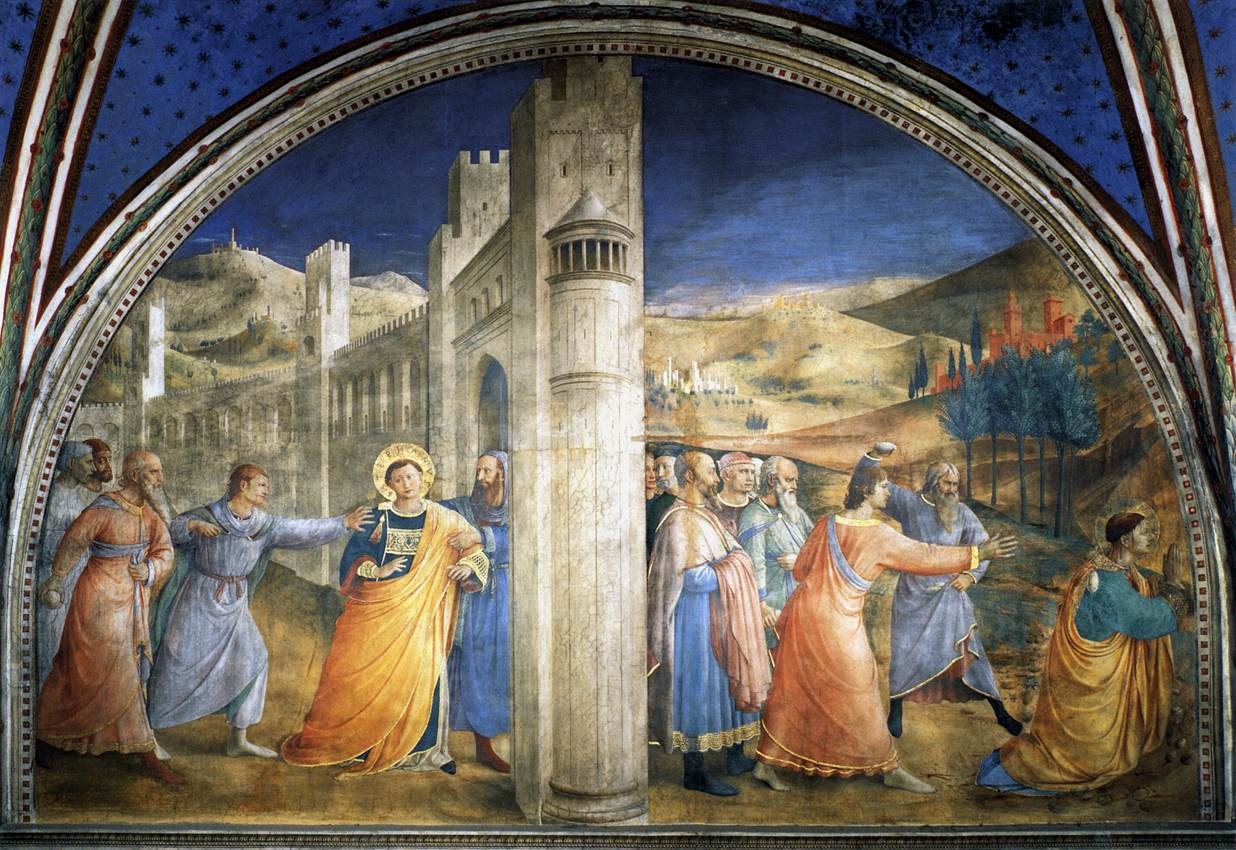

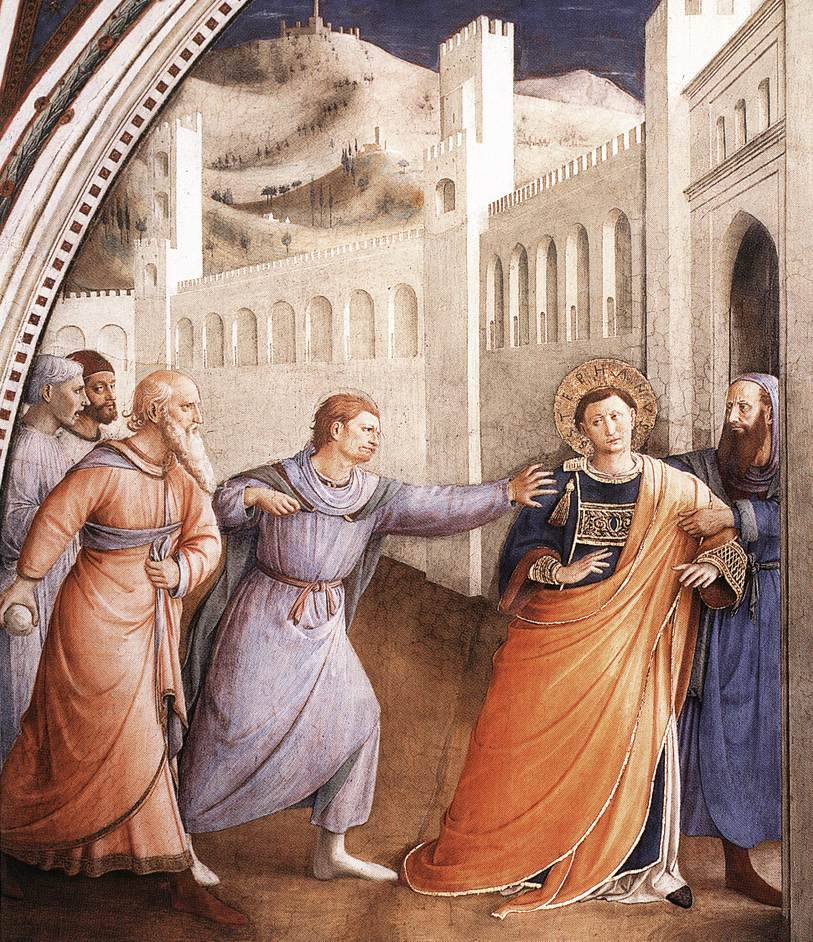

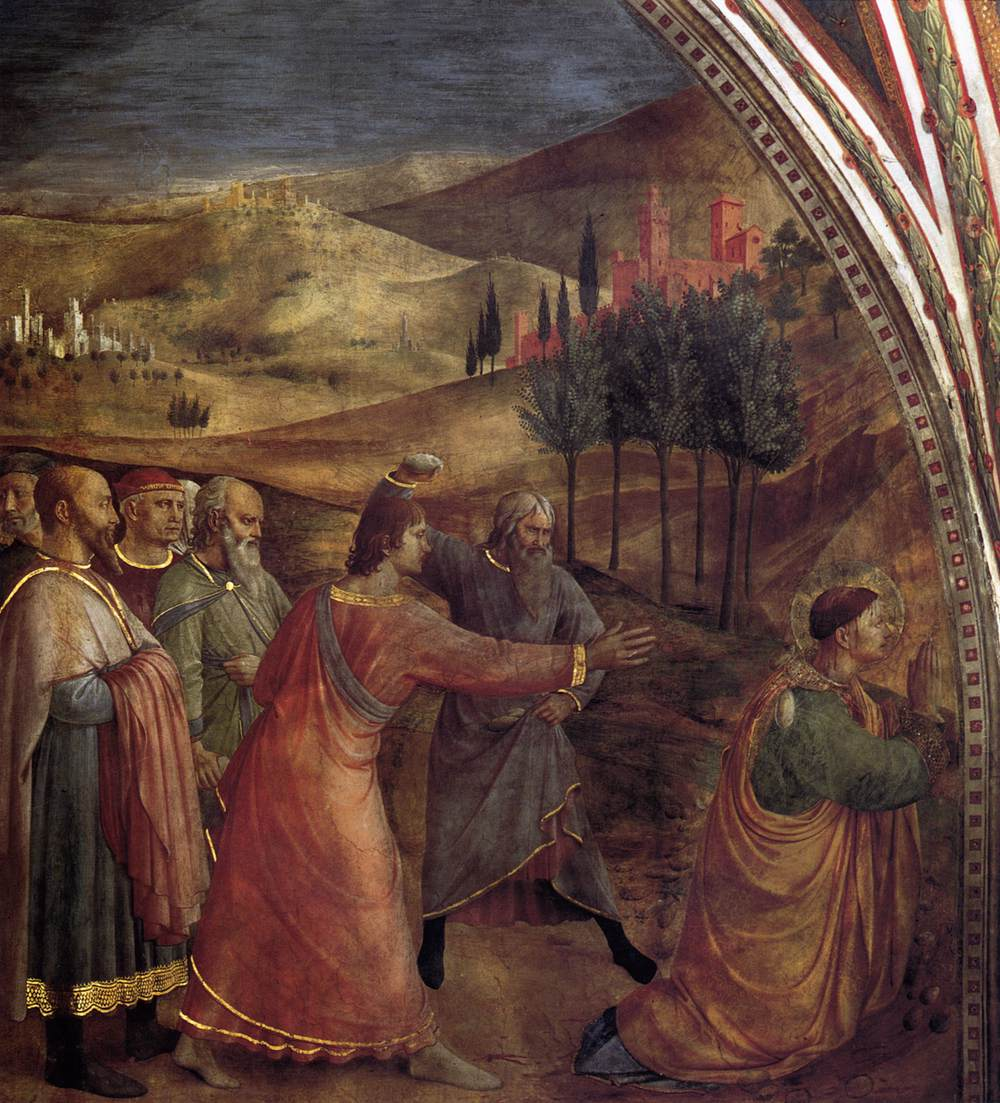

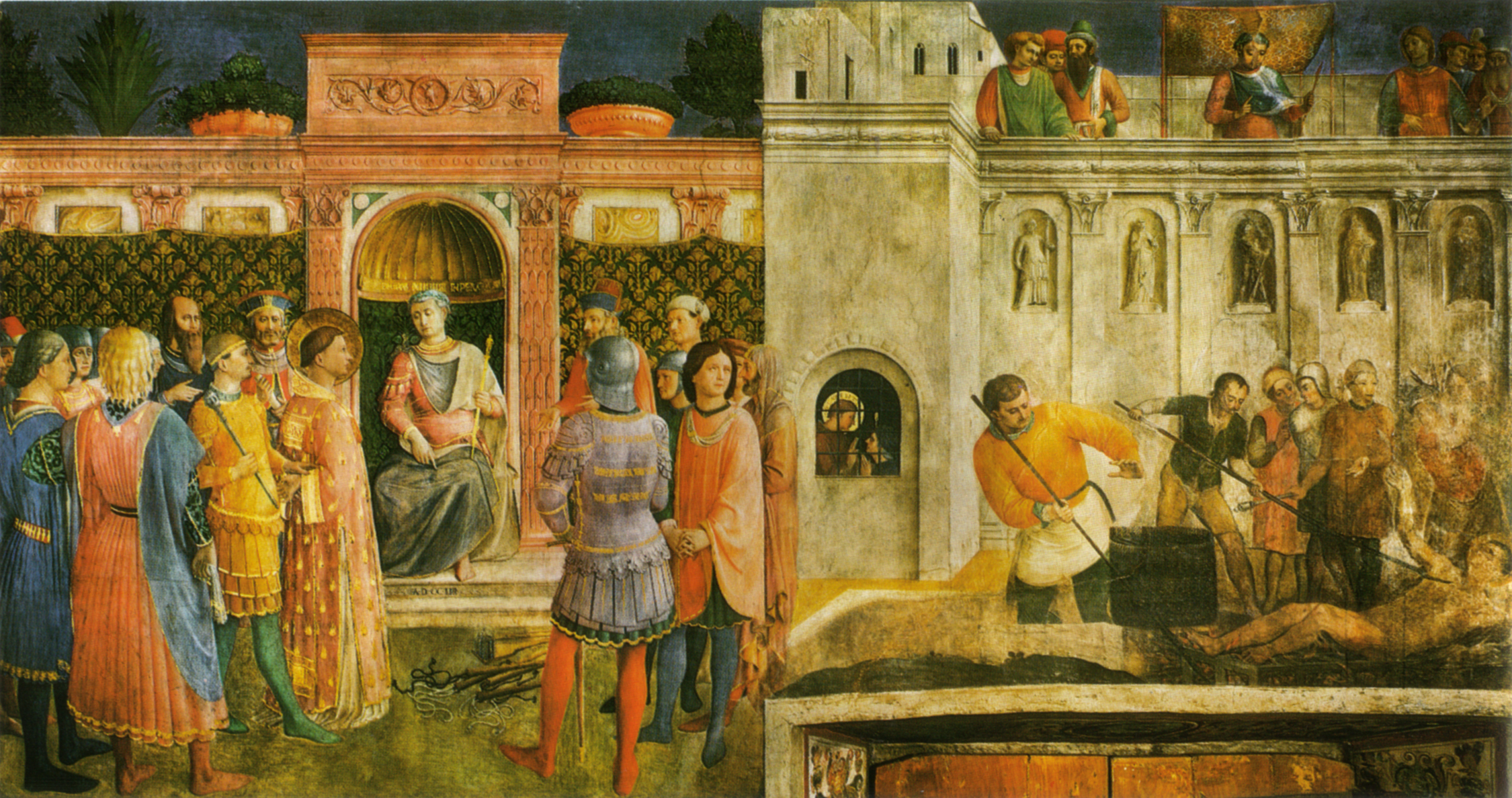

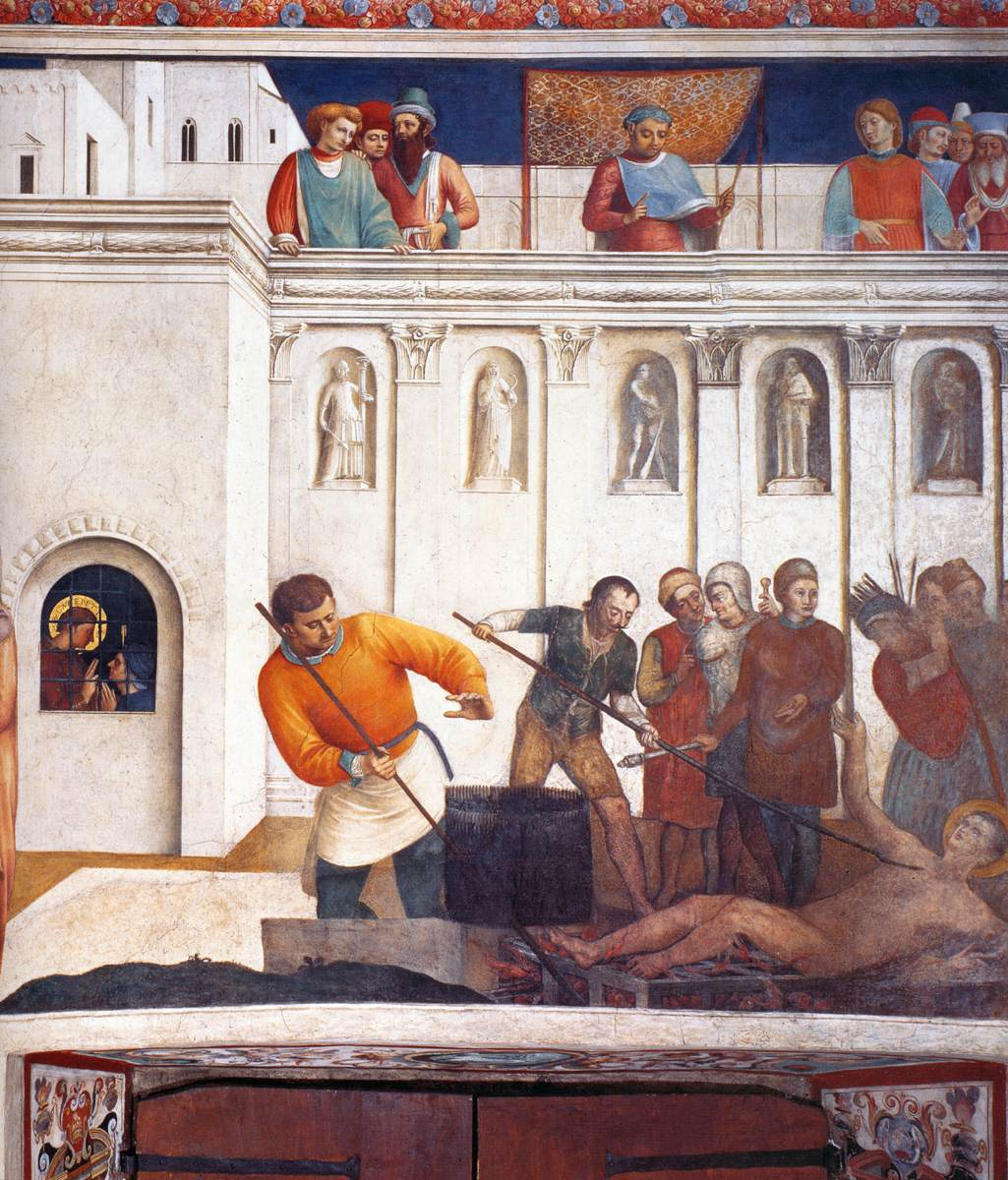

== See also ==
- Index of Vatican City-related articles
