= San Marco, Florence =

Church, convent, and museum in Italy

Coordinates: 43.77847325072136°N 11.259024442660994°E

Basilica di San Marco
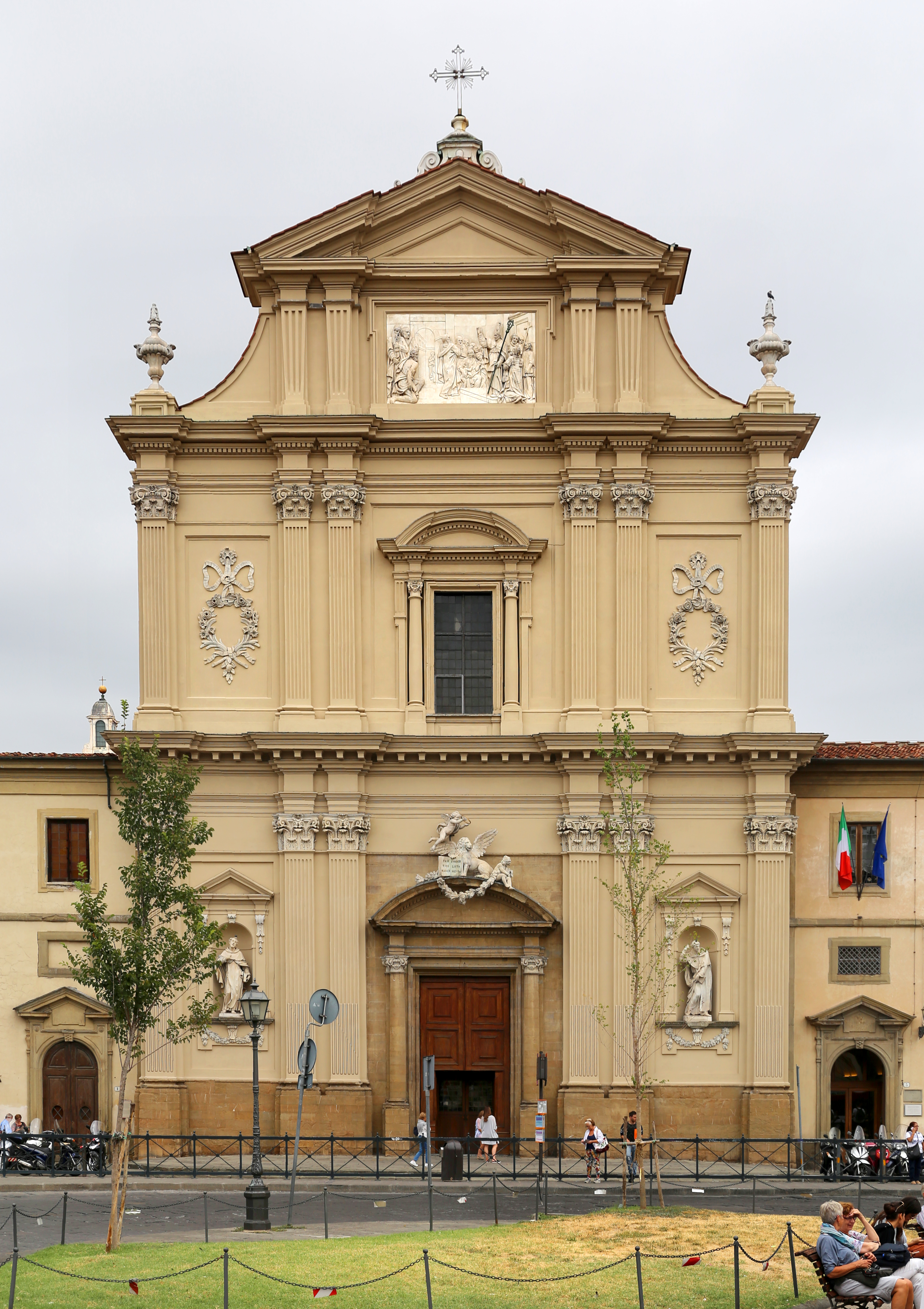
- The façade of the church of San Marco
- Basilica di San Marco
- Denomination: Roman Catholic
- Religious order: Dominican

History
- Status: Conventual church
- Dedication: Mark the Evangelist

Architecture
- Architectural type: Neoclassical
- Years built: 12th – 18th century

San Marco is a Catholic religious complex in Florence, Italy. It comprises a church and a convent. During the 15th century it was home to two famous Dominicans, the painter Fra Angelico and the preacher Girolamo Savonarola. The church houses the relics of St Antoninus of Florence and the tomb of Pico Della Mirandola, a Renaissance philosopher and humanist.

== History ==
=== Sylvestrines ===
The present convent occupies the site where a Vallombrosian monastery existed in the 13th century, which later passed to the Sylvestrine monks. The church was used both for monastic liturgical functions and as a parish church.

From this initial period there have recently been rediscovered some traces of frescoes below floor level. In 1418 the Sylvestrines, accused of laxity in their observance of the Rule, were pressured to leave, but it took a direct intervention of Pope Eugene IV and the Council of Basel before finally in 1437 the San Marco buildings were vacated, the displaced Sylvestrines moved to the smaller monastery of San Giorgio alla Costa.

=== Dominicans ===
A decisive element in securing the move was the intervention of Cosimo de' Medici the Elder, who since 1420 had already shown his support for the reformed Franciscan convent of Bosco ai Frati. From his return from exile in 1434, he had made clear his desire to see an observant community of Dominicans established in Florence. This was achieved when a group arrived from the Convent of San Domenico, Fiesole, not far from the city. On their arrival, the new residents found the San Marco buildings in poor condition, so much so that for two years or so they were obliged to live in damp cells or wooden huts. For funds to renovate the entire complex, they appealed to Cosimo. According to Giorgio Vasari's Lives of the Most Excellent Painters, Sculptors, and Architects, Cosimo in fact invested in the new convent a notable amount of finance, amounting to some 40,000 florins.

=== Medici reconstruction ===
In 1437 Cosimo commissioned Michelozzo, the Medici family's favourite architect, to rebuild the San Marco convent on Renaissance lines. He worked on San Marco from 1439 to 1444. By 1438 the work was well underway and the final dedication took place on Epiphany night 1443 in the presence of Pope Eugene IV and the Archbishop of Capua, cardinal Niccolò d'Acciapaccio. San Marco became one of the main elements in the new configuration of the area to the North of the centre of Florence (the so-called “Medici quarter”), along with the Medici family palazzo and the basilica of San Lorenzo. These years marked the height of the Medici family's artistic patronage, above all in connection with the transfer to Florence of the Ecumenical Council from Ferrara to Florence in 1439. Michelozzo succeeded in developing an architectural model for the renaissance library. It included a long narrow hall, divided into three parts by two rows of plain columns.

=== Church ===
The church has a single nave with side chapels designed in the late 16th century by Giambologna, and housing paintings from the 16th–17th centuries. In the late 17th century the tribune and the carved ceiling were also realized. A further renovation was carried on in 1678 by Pier Francesco Silvani. The façade, in Neo-Classical style, was built in 1777–1778.

It houses the relics of Antoninus of Florence, a founder of the San Marco, and later Archbishop of Florence; Cosimo de’ Medici used to say that the safety of Florence depended entirely on his prayers. Pico Della Mirandola and other notables of Florentine society are also buried in the church.

Among the artworks, the most ancient is a 14th-century crucifix in the counter-façade. The crucifix on the high altar (1425–1428) is by Fra Angelico. Over the first altar to the right is St. Thomas Praying by Santi di Tito from 1593, while over the second altar is a Madonna with Saints by Fra Bartolomeo.

Giambologna completed the Cappella di Sant'Antonino (also known as Salviati Chapel) in May 1589. The Salviati family had been linked by marriage to the Medici (Pope Leo XI was the son of Francesca Salviati, the daughter of Giacomo Salviati and Lucrezia de' Medici). The interior was decorated in fresco with a Translation and Funeral of St. Antonino Perozzi by Domenico Passignano. The dome of the chapel is by Bernardino Poccetti, also author of frescoes in the Sacrament Chapel. The latter also has canvases by Santi di Tito, Crespi, Francesco Morandini, Jacopo da Empoli, and Francesco Curradi.

=== Convent ===
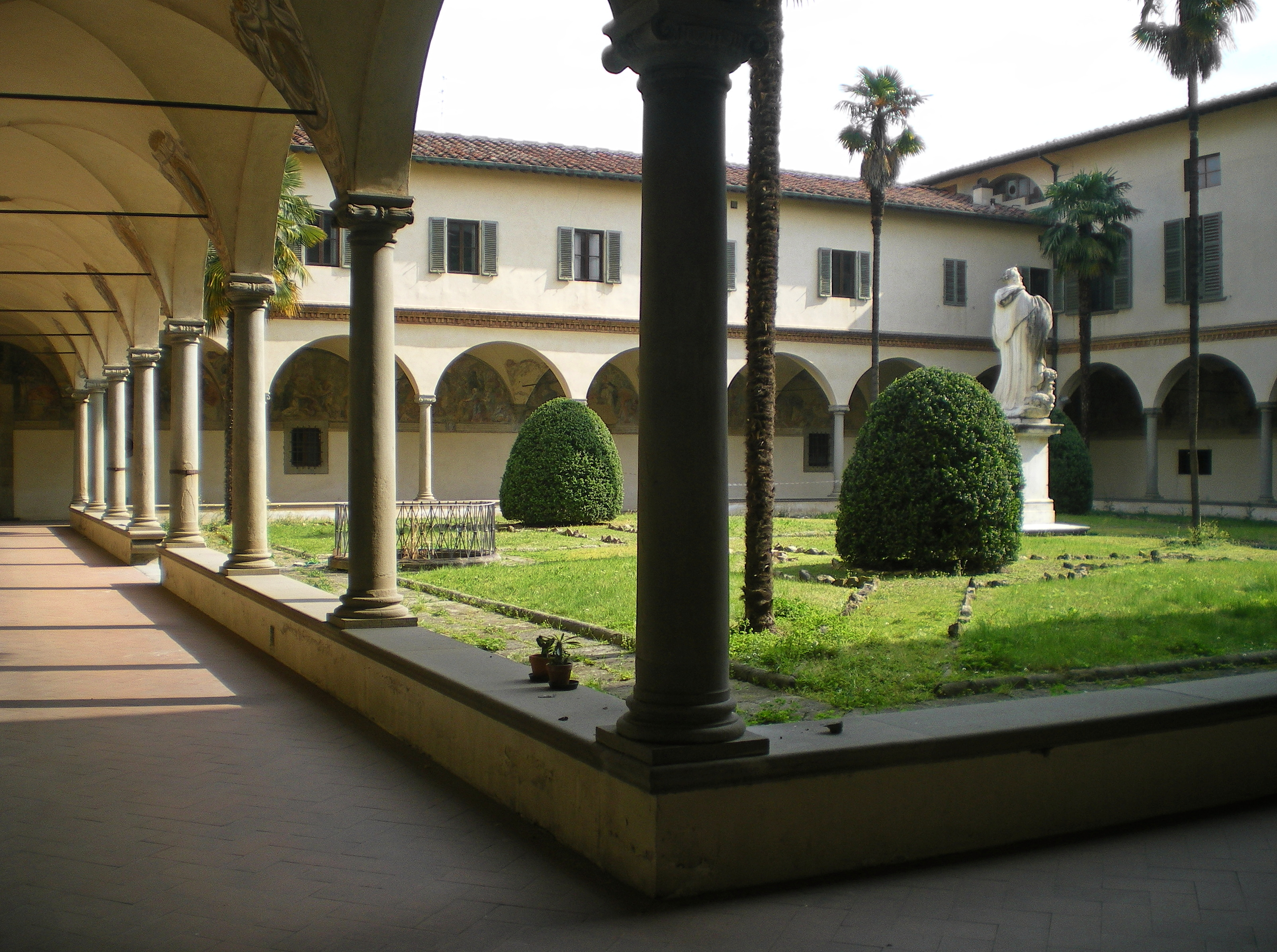
Cloister in the convent of San Marco

The work was planned according to arrangements that took account of simplicity and practicality, but were of great elegance: a sober, though comfortable, Renaissance edifice. The internal walls were covered in whitewashed plaster, layout centred on two cloisters (named after Saint Antoninus and Saint Dominic), with the usual conventual features of a chapter house, two refectories and guest quarters on the ground level. On the upper floor were the friars' cells, small walled enclosures overarched by a single trussed roof. The cloisters, chapter house and dorters (or dormitories), in the form described, must have been finished by 1440–1441. The South dormitory, which overlooks Piazza San Marco, was completed in 1442. Work on the rest of the convent went on until 1452.

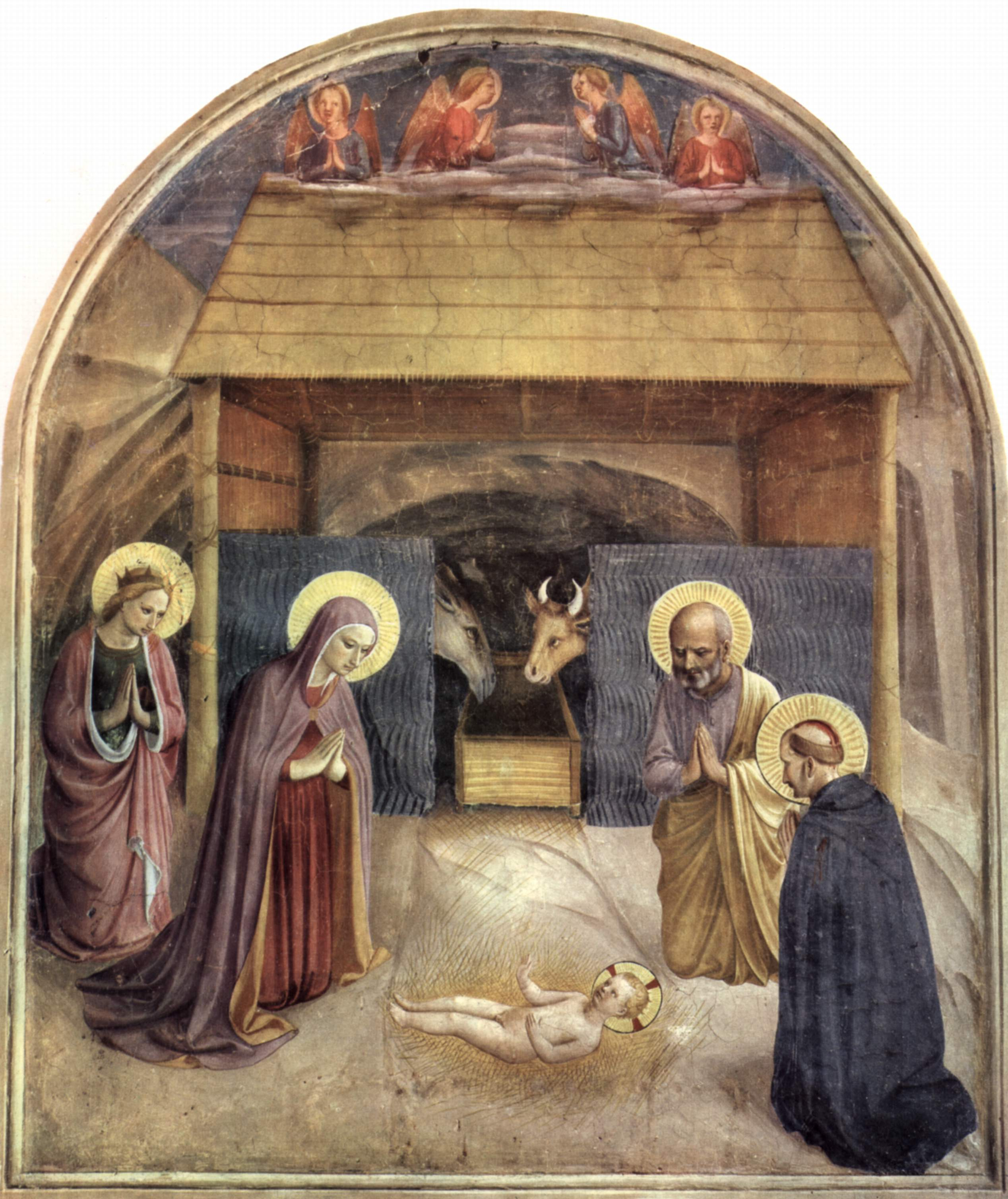
The adoration of the Christ child, fresco by Fra Angelico in one of the monks' cells in the convent

Cosimo de' Medici had a cell in the convent, in the corridor with cells dedicated to guests (adjacent to those of the friars), for his personal retreat. These cells of the friars' dorter or dormitory, including that of Cosimo, and many other walls were decorated by Fra Angelico in collaboration with others, including Benozzo Gozzoli.

An outstanding feature of the convent is the library on the first floor.

=== Savonarola era ===
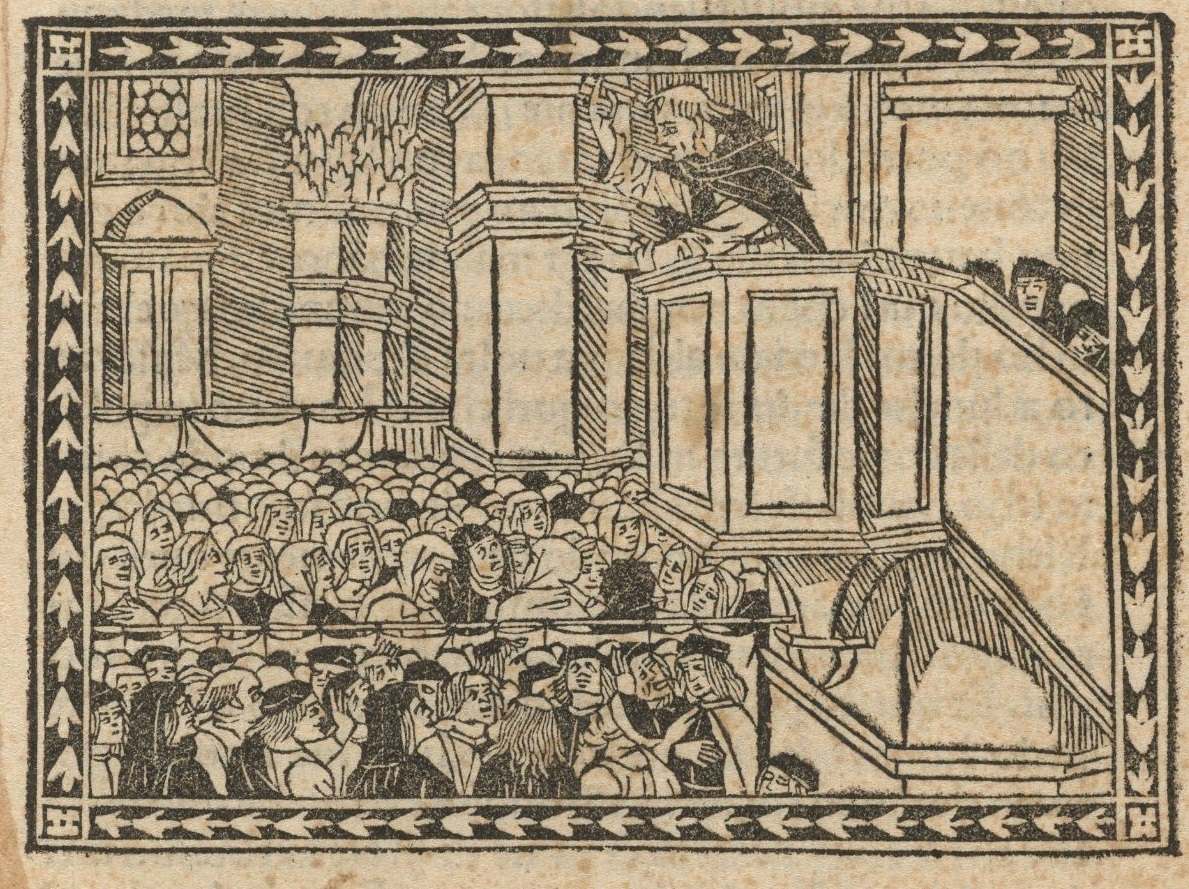
Illustration from Compendio di revelatione, 1496, by Savonarola

In addition to Fra Angelico, Antonino Pierozzi and Fra Bartolomeo, San Marco was the home from 1489 onwards of the friar Girolamo Savonarola, who represents a major event in the history of the house, and a drama on a European scale.

Having become prior of the convent, Savonarolo unleashed a fierce campaign against the Florentines’ morals and their ostentation of luxury. He was to fall foul of the court of Pope Alexander VI Borgia and was burnt at the stake in front of the Palazzo della Signoria in 1498.

=== Pharmacy ===
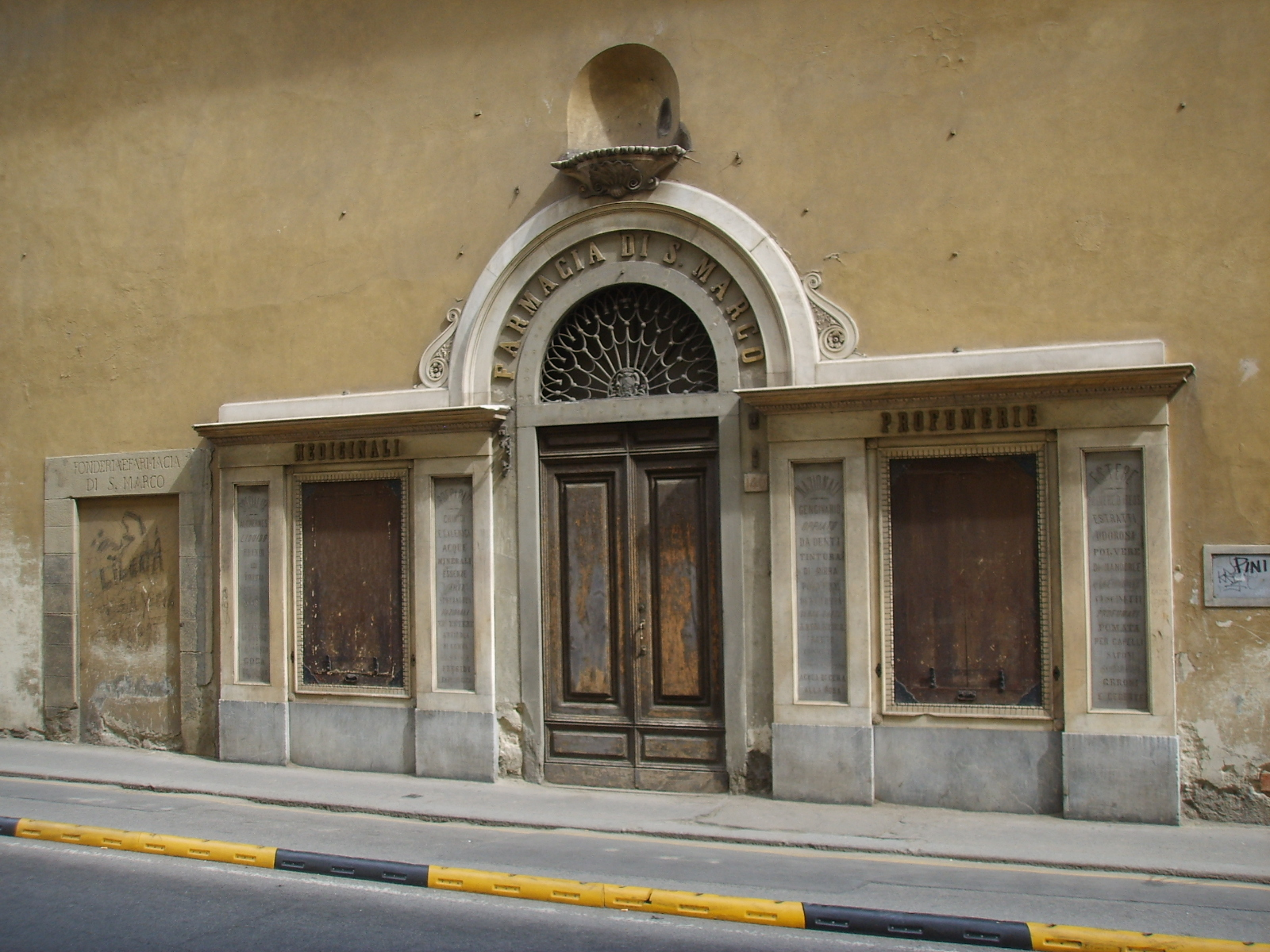
Pharmacy entrance in 2007

From 1460, the Dominican convent of San Marco had a pharmacy at Via Cavour 58. It was profitable, funding the friary, its charity work, and restoration works. One room, the sala del Coccodrillo, was open as a bistro in the 19th century. Custom declined in the 20th century following pharmacy legislation and pedestrianisation of Via Cavour, and it closed in 1995. One recipe for “Elixir vinoso ricostituente” contained wine, Bolivian coca leaves. and kola nuts, and was compared on its rediscovery in 2026 to the original Coca-Cola formula.

== Recent times ==
The convent was confiscated from the Dominicans in 1808, during the Napoleonic Wars, and again in 1866, when it was seized by the new Kingdom of Italy, whose temporary capital was Florence.

Until recently San Marco still housed a community of Dominican friars, who occupied the Western part of the complex adjacent to the larger cloister. In 2014 the few friars remaining were transferred to join the community at Santa Maria Novella in the city.

The convent is now constituted as the Museo Nazionale di San Marco. The entrance to the museum is from the Cloister of St. Antoninus, decorated with frescoes by Bernardino Poccetti in the 16th–17th century.
