= Alesso di Benozzo =

Italian painter

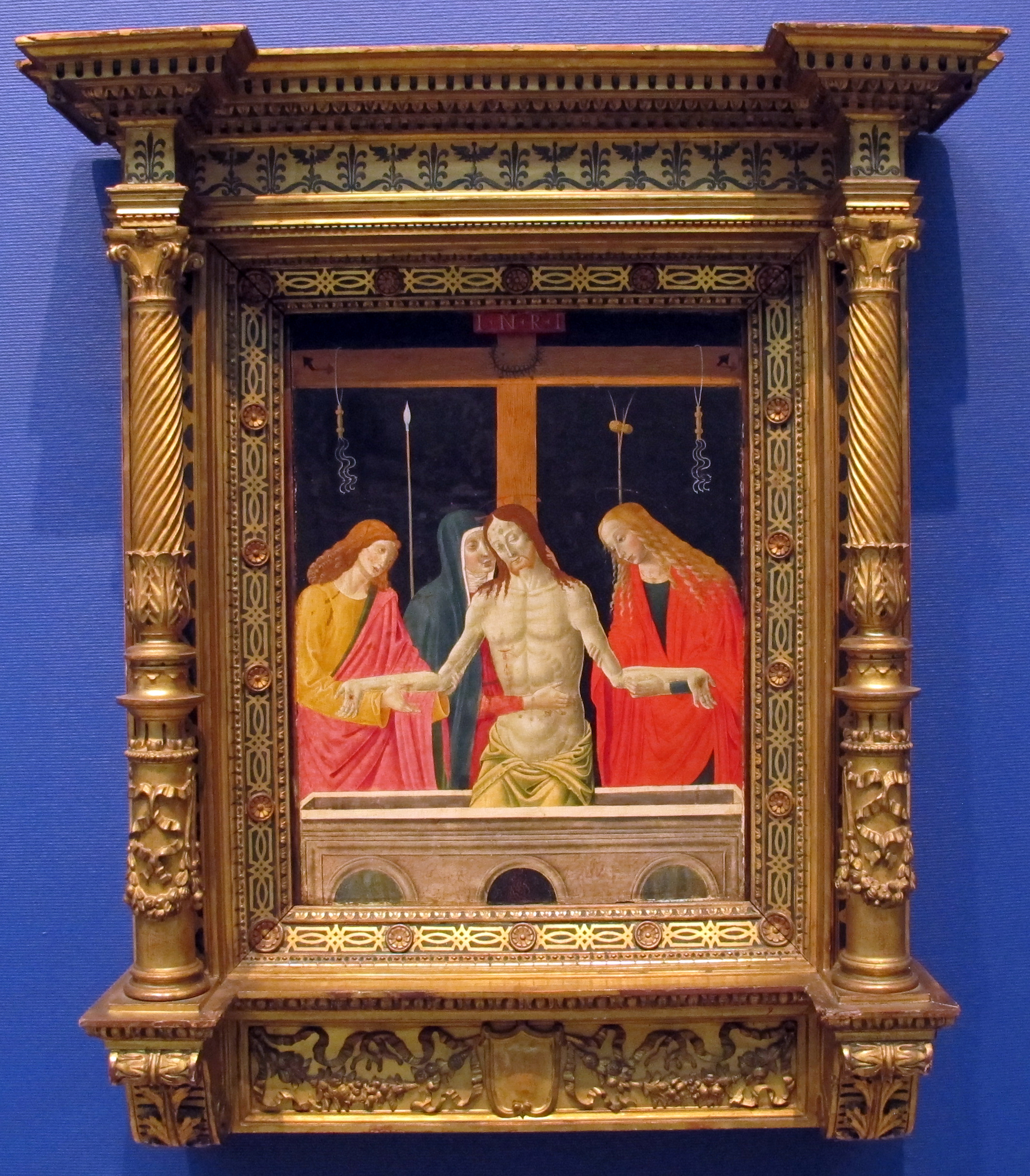
Man of Sorrows, early 1500s. Geneva, Musée d'Arte et d'Histoire.

Alesso di Benozzo (1473 – 1528), also known as Alesso Gozzoli, was an Italian Renaissance painter. He was born in Pisa in 1473 and began his career as an assistant to his father, the famous Florentine Benozzo Gozzoli. In 1492 he signed the Tabernacle of the Visitation (Castelfiorentino, Museo Benozzo Gozzoli) together with his father, who headed the project, and Alesso's brother, Francesco. Because of their similar styles, the specific contributions of the individual painters are not easy to distinguish, but the art historian Anna Padoa Rizzo has proposed that the more refined and elegant figures are by Alesso, whom documents suggest was Gozzoli's most esteemed son, and that the coarser passages are by Francesco, apparently of lesser renown. Padoa Rizzo in turn identified Alesso as the anonymous artist previously known by two names: the "Maestro Esiguo," invented by Roberto Longhi in reference to the painter's skinny and exiguous figures, and the "Alunno di Benozzo," literally the "student of Benozzo," a nickname invented by Bernard Berenson. His works were also once wrongly assigned to Amedeo Laini, called Amedeo da Pistoia.

Though a relatively minor painter, Alesso was an active member of Florence's painters' confraternity, the Compagnia di San Luca. From 1495 until 1497, he and his brothers Francesco and Gerolamo undertook to finish the frescoed Maestà in the Palazzo Comunale, Pistoia, which their father left incomplete on his death in 1497. In addition to frescoes, Alesso painted many small-scale devotional pictures, often of the Virgin and Child or scenes from the Passion of Christ or the life of the Virgin. Examples include the Annunciation in New York (Metropolitan Museum of Art), the Crucifixion in Boston (Isabella Stewart Gardner Museum), the Deposition of Christ in Tulsa (Philbrook Museum of Art), and two similar panels of the Man of Sorrows in Princeton (Princeton University Art Museum) and Geneva (Musée d'Art et d'Histoire). He also painted altarpieces, like the Visitation in Castelfiorentino (Museo di Santa Verdiana) and Madonna and Child with Four Saints in Florence (Museo del Bigallo). A smaller scale altarpiece by Alesso is now at the Zimmerli Art Museum at Rutgers University.

A significant number of drawings by Alesso have been identified, most by Berenson.
