= Deucalion and Pyrrha =

Deucalion and Pyrrha were a couple in Greek mythology, the only male and female survivors of the Greek version of the flood myth, who repopulated Earth by throwing stones over their shoulders.

== In art ==
- Deucalion and Pyrrha (Beccafumi)
- Deucalion and Pyrrha (Rubens)

== See also ==
- Adam and Eve
- Deucalion (mythology)
- Pyrrha (disambiguation)
