= Museo Horne =

Museum in Florence, Tuscany, Italy

Coordinates: 43°46′15.10″N 11°15′4.64″E

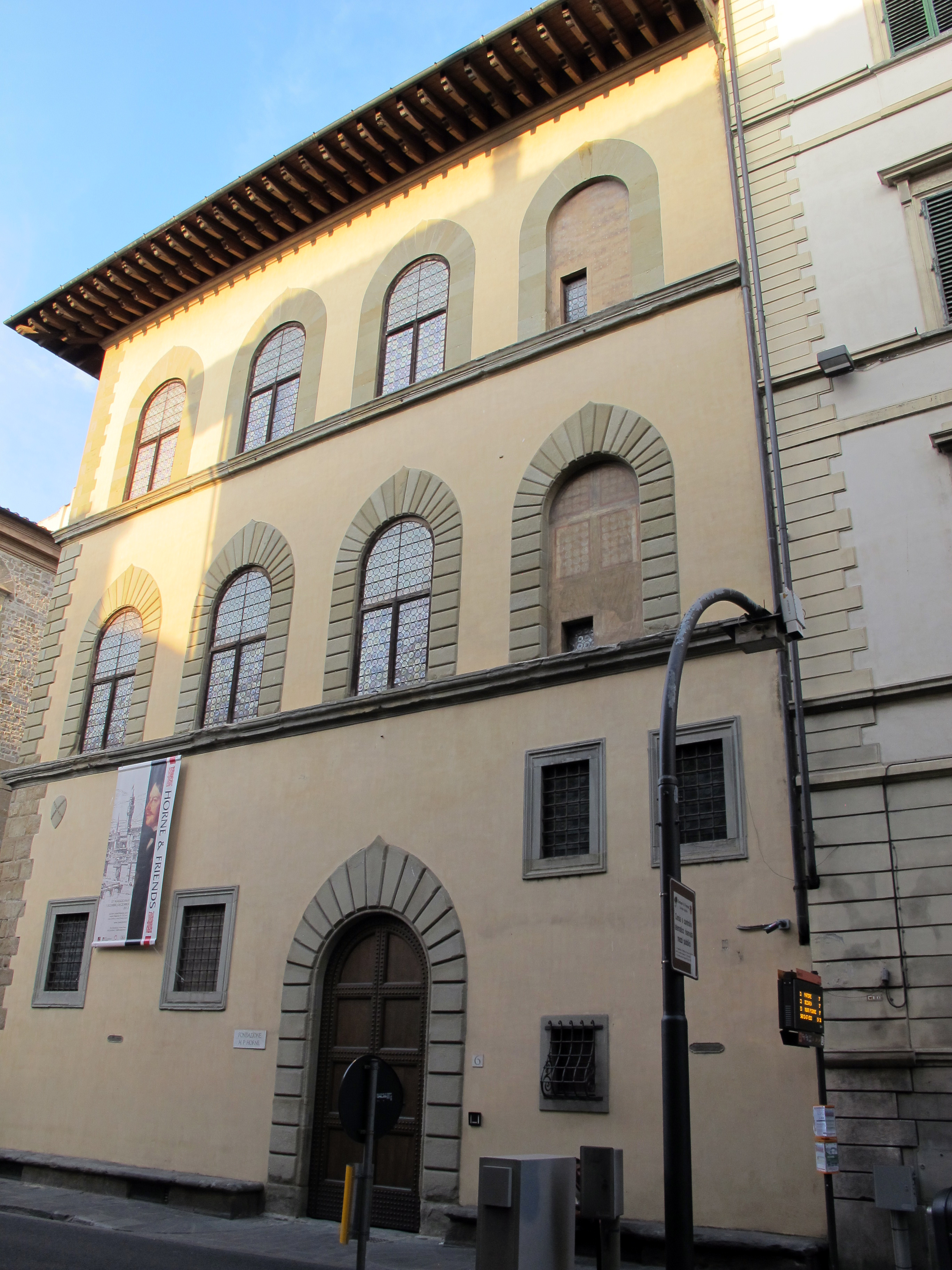
Museo Horne

The Museo Horne is a museum focusing on art and furnishings of the 14th and 15th centuries, located in the former Palazzo Corsi, on via de' Benci number 6 in Florence, Tuscany, Italy.

== History of the Palazzo Corsi-Horne ==
Buildings at the site were known from the early 14th century. In 1489, the site with large house was ceded by the Alberti family to Simone and Luigi di Jacopo Corsi. Over the period of 1495–1502, the structure was rebuilt with designs attributed to either Giuliano da Sangallo or more likely Simone del Pollaiolo with the sculptural help of the studio/followers of Baccio d'Agnolo or Benedetto da Rovezzano.

In 1911, the architect and art historian Herbert Percy Horne acquired the Palazzo Corsi on via de' Benci, in order to house his early Renaissance collections. He willed his collections and the palace to the state, with the stipulation that it be made into a museum and foundation.

== Catalogue of works on display ==
| Author | Subject/Title | Type | Data | Hall |
|---|---|---|---|---|
| Florentine | Sgabello con spalliera | tapestry | c. 1550–1620 | First floor – 1 |
| Agnolo di Polo | Salvatore | sculpture | c. 1500–1510 | First floor – 1 |
| Emilian | Armadio a due corpi | tapestry | c. 1600–1699 | First floor – 1 |
| Florentine | Sgabello con spalliera | tapestry | c. 1600–1620 | First floor – 1 |
| Jacopo Sansovino | Madonna and Child | sculpture | c. 1500–1550 | First floor – 1 |
| Emilian | Sacrifice of Isaac | sculpture | c. 1500–1599 | First floor – 1 |
| Emilian | Partenza di Esaù | sculpture | c. 1500–1599 | First floor – 1 |
| Florentine | Cassapanca | tapestry | c. 1500–1520 | First floor – 1 |
| Florentine | Madonna and Child | sculpture | c. 1400–1499 | First floor – 1 |
| Pseudo Pier Francesco Fiorentino | Adoration of Child | painting | c. 1450–1500 | First floor – 1 |
| Giovanni Francesco Tura | Adoration by Shepherds | painting | c. 1520 | First floor – 1 |
| Dosso Dossi | Allegory of Music | painting | c. 1485 | First floor – 1 |
| Jacopo del Sellaio | St Jerome Penitent | painting | c. 1485 | First floor – 1 |
| Francesco Morone | Communion of St Onofrius | painting | c. 1510–1515 | First floor – 1 |
| Luca Signorelli | Saint Catherine of Alexandria | painting | c. 1512 | First floor – 1 |
| Tuscan | Cassapanca | tapestry | c. 1575–1600 | First floor – 1 |
| Maestro di San Severino | Exorcism of a possessed woman | painting | 1480–1482 | First floor – 1 |
| Tuscan | Savonarola chair | tapestry | c. 1500–1599 | First floor – 1 |
| Andrea della Robbia (scuola) | Madonna and Child | sculpture | c. 1490 | First floor – 1 |
| Naddo Ceccarelli (attr.) | Crucifixion with mourners | painting | c. 1325–1350 | First floor – 1 |
| Masaccio | Scenes from the Life of Saint Julian | painting | c. 1424 | First floor – 1 |
| Pietro di Giovanni d'Ambrosio | St Agatha | painting | c. 1440–1450 | First floor – 1 |
| Pietro di Giovanni d'Ambrosio | St Ursula | painting | c. 1440–1450 | First floor – 1 |
| Niccolò di Segna | Christ Crucified | painting | 1330–1335 | First floor – 1 |
| School of Fra Damiano da Bergamo | St George and the dragon | wooden mosaic | c. 1525–1550 | First floor – 1 |
| Italian | Virtù | sculpture | c. 1200–1299 | First floor – 1 |
| Southcentral Italy | Credenza | tapestry | c. 1600–1850 | First floor – 1 |
| Filippino Lippi | Standard with Crucifixion | painting | c. 1490 | First floor – 1 |
| Emilian | Madonna and Child | sculpture | c. 1600–1699 | First floor – 1 |
| Central Italian | Credenza | tapestry | c. 1600–1620 | First floor – 1 |
| Henry Harris Brown | Portrait of Herbert P. Horne | painting | 1908 | First floor – 1 |
| Giovanni dal Ponte | Madonna and Child | painting | c. 1400–1420 | First floor – 1 |
| Baldassarre Carrari (attr.) | Madonna and Child and two ingers | painting | c. 1450–1500 | First floor – 1 |
| Tuscan | Culla | tapestry | c. 1550–1600 | First floor – 1 |
| Pietro Lorenzetti | Three Saints | painting | c. 1315 | First floor – 1 |
| Piero di Cosimo | Saint Jerome in Meditation | painting | c. 1495–1500 | First floor – 1 |
| Florentine | Cassone a sarcofago | tapestry | c. 1475–1500 | First floor – 1 |
| Francesco di Antonio di Bartolomeo | St Mary Magdalen, Archangel Raphael, Tobias, and female donor | painting | c. 1425–1430 | First floor – 1 |
| Da Donatello | Due calchi dei Putti dancing dal Pergamo di Prato | sculpture | ? | First floor – 1 |
| Florentine | Sacra famiglia | painting | c. 1450–1499 | First floor – 1 |
| Bernardo Daddi | Madonna and Child enthroned with saints | painting | c. 1336–1337 | First floor – 1 |
| Bernardo Daddi | Crucifixion | painting | c. 1336–1337 | First floor – 1 |
| Tuscan | Cassone | tapestry | c. 1400–1599 | First floor – 1 |
| Benozzo Gozzoli | Deposition of Christ | painting | 1491 | First floor – 1 |
| Sienese | Gradino | sculpture | c. 1550–1600 | First floor – 1 |
| Desiderio da Settignano | Head of Harpy | sculpture | c. 1458–1459 (with restoration 19th century.) | First floor – 1 |
| School of Donatello | Bust of child | sculpture | c. 1440–1499 | First floor – 1 |
| Sienese | Credenza | tapestry | c. 1450–1500 | First floor – 1 |
| Florentine | Madonna and Child and young John the Baptist | painting | c. 1490 | First floor – 1 |
| Bartolomeo di Giovanni | Mythologic Composition | painting | c. 1450–1500 | First floor – 1 |
| Italian | Cassettina | tapestry | c. 1600–1699 | First floor – 1 |
| Tuscan | Bacile in rame | tapestry | c. 1500–1599 | First floor – 1 |
| Tuscan | Cassone | tapestry | c. 1500–1599 | First floor – 1 |
| Bartolomeo Ammannati | Male nude | sculpture | c. 1580–1590 | First floor – 1 |
| Jacopo Sansovino | cavaliere che calpesta un vinto | sculpture | c. 1506–1510 | First floor – 1 |
| Giambologna | Venus accovacciata | sculpture | c. 1584 | First floor – 1 |
| Emilian | Tavolo | tapestry | c. 1600–1699 | First floor – 1 |
| South-central Italy | Sei sgabelli con spalliera a ventaglio | tapestry | c. 1500–1699 | First floor – 1 |
| Lorenzo di Credi | Adoration del Bambino con san Giovannino | painting | c. 1500–1510 | First floor – 2 |
| Florentine | Paride giacente | painting | c. 1450 | First floor – 2 |
| Sienese | Cassone con gli stemmi Bellucci and Teodosi | tapestry | c. 1500–1550 | First floor – 2 |
| Carlo Dolci | St Sebastian | painting | c. 1630–1680 | First floor – 2 |
| Lo Scheggia | Madonna and Child and two angels | painting | c. 1426 | First floor – 2 |
| Tuscan | Credenza | tapestry | c. 1590–1610 | First floor – 2 |
| Francesco Furini | Wife of Lot | painting | c. 1640–1645 | First floor – 2 |
| Emilian | Armadio | tapestry | c. 1600–1699 c. | First floor – 2 |
| Andrea del Brescianino | Child Jesus and young St John the Baptist | painting | c. 1510 | First floor – 2 |
| Niccolò Giolfino | Two scenes from myth of Phaeton | painting | c. 1510 | First floor – 2 |
| Pittore veneto | Ritratto del sultano Selim I | painting | c. 1512–1520 | First floor – 2 |
| Maestro del Polittico della Cappella Medici | Tabernacolo portatile | painting | c. 1300–1350 | First floor – 2 |
| Gian Lorenzo Bernini | Bozzetto per angeli in gloria | sculpture | c. 1650 | First floor – 2 |
| Francesco Curradi | Cena in Emmaus | painting | c. 1620–1630 | First floor – 2 |
| Manifattura veneziana | Calice con coppa | vetro | c. 1600–1699 | First floor – 2 |
| Florentine | Decollation del Battista | painting | c. 1600–1699 | First floor – 2 |
| Neri di Bicci | Madonna and Child and due angeli | painting | c. 1450–1492 | First floor – 2 |
| Maestro del Crocifisso Corsi | Martirio di san Pietro | painting | c. 1330 | First floor – 2 |
| Naddo Ceccarelli | Madonna and Child | painting | c. 1347 | First floor – 2 |
| Manifattura veneziana | Paiolo | tapestry | c. 1500–1699 | First floor – 2 |
| Tuscan | Cassone | tapestry | c. 1500–1550 | First floor – 2 |
| Giotto | Saint Stephen | painting | c. 1330–1335 | First floor – 2 |
| Lucchese | Vergin of the Annunciation | sculpture | c. 1400–1499 | First floor – 2 |
| Central Italian | Credenza | tapestry | c. 1590–1610 | First floor – 2 |
| Jacopo del Casentino | Madonna and Child | painting | c. 1300–1350 | First floor – 2 |
| Lorenzo di Credi and bottega | Cassone con stemma Pitti | tapestry | c. 1490 | First floor – 2 |
| Francesco Furini | Semiramide | painting | c. 1640–1645 | First floor – 2 |
| Boccaccio Boccaccino | Christ blessing | painting | 1497–1499 | First floor – 2 |
| Domenico Beccafumi | Deucalion and Pyrrha | painting | c. 1525–1530 | First floor – 2 |
| Pietro di Francesco Orioli (attr.) | Christ crowned with thorns | painting | c. 1490 | First floor – 2 |
| Francesco Furini | Artemisia | painting | c. 1630–1640 | First floor – 2 |
| Giambologna | Nudo virile | sculpture | c. 1572 | First floor – 2 |
| Manifattura dell'Italia centrale | Tavolo | tapestry | c. 1550–1600 | First floor – 2 |
| Giampietrino | Santa Maria Maddalena | painting | c. 1500–1550 | First floor – 3 |
| Niccolò di Tommaso | St John the Evangelist | painting | c. 1350 | First floor – 3 |
| Central Italian | balia chair | tapestry | c. 1600–1699 | First floor – 3 |
| Lippo di Benivieni (attr.) | Maestà coi santi Pietro and Lucia | painting | 1315–1318 | First floor – 3 |
| Maestro di Anghiari | Scena di battaglia | painting | c. 1460–1470 | First floor – 3 |
| Manifattura dell'Italia centrale | Cassone | tapestry | c. 1490 con restauri del XIX secolo | First floor – 3 |
| Niccolò di Tommaso | St Paul | painting | c. 1350 | First floor – 3 |
| Florentine | Bust of Man | sculpture | c. 1500–1599 | First floor – 3 |
| Lorenzo Monaco | Portable Crucifix | painting | 1405–1410 | First floor – 3 |
| Ubmbrian | Pace con Cristo in pietà | painting | c. 1400–1499 | First floor – 3 |
| Pier Antonio degli Abbati | Architectural perspective | wooden mosaic | 1485–1487 | First floor – 3 |
| Agnolo Gaddi | Volto di Cristo | painting | c. 1385–1390 | First floor – 3 |
| Florentine | Sgabelli Strozzi (2) | tapestry | c. 1500–1550 | First floor – 3 |
| Desiderio da Settignano (attr.) | young st John the Baptist | sculpture | c. 1450 | First floor – 3 |
| Girolamo di Benvenuto | Venere and Cupido | painting | c. 1500–1525 | First floor – 3 |
| Taddeo Gaddi | Madonna and Child | painting | c. 1320–1350 | First floor – 3 |
| Pittore toscano | Madonna and Child and un donatore | painting | c. 1290 | First floor – 3 |
| Tuscan | Sgabello con spalliera | tapestry | c. 1600–1699 | First floor – 3 |
| Domenico Beccafumi | Holy Family with the Infant John the Baptist and a Donor | painting | c. 1528 | First floor – 3 |
| Florentine | Busto femminile | sculpture | c. 1400–1499 | First floor – 3 |
| Florentine | Stipo | tapestry | c. 1450–1500 con restauri del 1850–1899 c. | First floor – 3 |
| Florentine | Busto femminile | sculpture | c. 1400–1499 | First floor – 3 |
| Sienese | Bancone da sagrestia | tapestry | c. 1400–1499 | First floor – 3 |
| Vecchietta | San Paolo | sculpture | c. 1460 | First floor – 3 |
| Lorenzo Ghiberti (studio) | Croce astile | sculpture | c. 1410–1450 | First floor – 3 |
| Agnolo di Polo (attr.) | St Jerome in prayer | sculpture | c. 1490 | First floor – 3 |
| Central Italian | Cassone da monacation with Stories of Giuseppe ebreo | tapestry | c. 1450 | First floor – 3 |
| Italian | Copy of cassette-reliquiario | tapestry | c. 1800–1899 | First floor – 3 |
| Florentine | Tavola reale | tapestry | c. 1500–1599 | First floor – 3 |
| Southern Italian | Cassetta for Charity | tapestry | c. 1500–1599 | First floor – 3 |
| Central Italian | Tavolo | tapestry | c. 1600–1699 | First floor – 3 |
| Giorgio Vasari | Portrait of Giorgio Vasari | painting | 1600–1699 c. | Second floor – 1 |
| Bartolomeo di Giovanni | Madonna and Child and young St John the Baptist | painting | c. 1490 | Second floor – 1 |
| Southern Italian | Cassone | tapestry | c. 1500–1599 | Second floor – 1 |
| Tuscan | two chairs | tapestry | c. 1500–1599 | Second floor – 1 |
| Tuscan | Sgabello con spalliera | tapestry | c. 1600–1699 | Second floor – 1 |
| Florentine | David kills Goliath | painting | c. 1450–1460 | Second floor – 1 |
| Florentine | Triumph of David | painting | c. 1450–1460 | Second floor – 1 |
| Tuscan | Credenza | tapestry | 1610 c. restored 19th century | Second floor – 1 |
| Central Italian | Chair a pozzetto | tapestry | 1490–1510 c. | Second floor – 1 |
| Bartolomeo della Gatta | St Roch | painting | 1486–1487 c. | Second floor – 1 |
| Antonio Begarelli (attr.) | Madonna and Child and young St John the Baptist | sculpture | c. 1520–1565 | Second floor – 1 |
| Tuscan | Credenza | tapestry | 1600–1699 rewoven 19th century | Second floor – 1 |
| Tommaso del Mazza (attr.) | St Catherine of Alexandria | painting | c. 1370–1375 | Second floor – 1 |
| Luca della Robbia | Madonna and Child and two angels | sculpture | ? | Second floor – 1 |
| Giovanni di Paolo | Young St John the Baptist | painting | c. 1450 | Second floor – 1 |
| Adriatic painter | Cristo in pietà con la Vergine dolente | painting | c. 1300–1350 | Second floor – 1 |
| School of Giotto | Madonna and Child in trono and santi | painting | c. 1300–1399 | Second floor – 1 |
| Filippo Lippi | Pietà | painting | c. 1435–1440 | Second floor – 1 |
| Naddo Ceccarelli (attr.) | Crucifixion with Magdalen and mourners | painting | c. 1333 | Second floor – 1 |
| Italian | Custodia per monete | tapestry | c. 1800–1899 | Second floor – 1 |
| South-Central Italian | Stipo a uso di medagliere | tapestry | 1600–1699 con aggiunte del 20th century | Second floor – 1 |
| Antonio Rossellino | Madonna dei Candelabri | sculpture | c. 1450–1479 | Second floor – 1 |
| Alfonso Lombardi | St Petronius | sculpture | c. 1500–1530 | Second floor – 1 |
| Alfonso Lombardi | San Domenico | sculpture | 1500–1530 c. | Second floor – 1 |
| Manifattura italiana | Stipo a uso di medagliere | tapestry | 1850–1899 c. | Second floor – 1 |
| Matteo di Giovanni | Madonna and Child tra i santi Pietro and Paolo | painting | 1460 c. | Second floor – 1 |
| Francesco Salviati | Ritratto di ignoto | painting | 1500–1550 c. | Second floor – 1 |
| Filippino Lippi | Queen Vashti Leaving the Royal Palace | painting | 1480 c. | Second floor – 1 |
| Tuscan | Credenza | tapestry | c. 1700–1799 | Second floor – 1 |
| Maestro di San Martino a Mensola | San Francesco and two donors | painting | 1385–1390 c. | Second floor – 1 |
| Florentine | Episode of Battle of Anghiari | painting | 1500–1599 c. | Second floor – 1 |
| Maestro del Trittico Horne | Horne triptych | painting | 1310–1320 c. | Second floor – 1 |
| Master of Panzano | Predella of Christ and saints | painting | 1370–1380 c. | Second floor – 1 |
| Sienese | Armadio da sagrestia | tapestry | c. 1450 | Second floor – 1 |
| Lombard | Christ Crucified and santi | painting | c. 1500–1599 c. | Second floor – 1 |
| Piedmontese | Poltrona | tapestry | 1600–1699 c. | Second floor – 1 |
| Timoteo Viti (attr.) | Redeemer | painting | 1510 c. | Second floor – 1 |
| Simone Martini and Lippo Memmi | Diptych of Madonna and Child and Christ in pietà | painting | 1326–1328 | Second floor – 1 |
| Lombard | St Peter | sculpture | c. 1400–1499 | Second floor – 1 |
| Lombard | St Paul | sculpture | c. 1400–1499 | Second floor – 1 |
| Florentine | Sacristy bench | tapestry | c. 1450–1500 | Second floor – 1 |
| Tuscan | St John the Baptist | sculpture | c. 1400–1499 | Second floor – 1 |
| Sienese | Tre dipinti con fatti storici della famiglia Piccolomini | painting | c. 1600–1699 | Second floor – 2 |
| Master of Crucifix of San Michele in Foro (attr.) | Madonna and Child | painting | 1150–1175 | Second floor – 2 |
| Florentine | Chair a "iccasse" | tapestry | c. 1590 | Second floor – 2 |
| Florentine | Funeral of Grand Duke Cosimo III | painting | c. 1723 | Second floor – 2 |
| Emilian | Armadio | tapestry | c. 1600–1699 | Second floor – 2 |
| Da Piero della Francesca | Portrait of Federico da Montefeltro | painting | c. 1470–1500 | Second floor – 2 |
| South-central Italian | Sgabello con spalliera a ventaglio | tapestry | c. 1500–1599 | Second floor – 2 |
| Francesco Vanni | Moses breaks the tablets of the law | painting | c. 1500–1599 | Second floor – 2 |
| Sienese | Cassone con stemmi Bellucci and Teodosi | tapestry | c. 1500–1550 | Second floor – 2 |
| Umbrian | chair | tapestry | c. 1690 | Second floor – 2 |
| Follower of Leonardo | Christ Savior | painting | c. 1510 | Second floor – 2 |
| Tuscan | Sgabello con spalliera | tapestry | c. 1600–1699 | Second floor – 2 |
| Florentine | Lettuccio | tapestry | c. 1490–1510 | Second floor – 2 |
| Domenico Beccafumi | Putti Bearing a Tondo showing the Drunkenness of Noah | painting | c. 1522–1523 | Second floor – 2 |
| South-Central Italian | Chair | tapestry | c. 1700–1799 | Second floor – 2 |
| Bolognese | Portrait of architect | painting | c. 1500–1599 | Second floor – 2 |
| Angelo di Lorentino (attr.) | St Sebastian | painting | c. 1500–1550 | Second floor – 2 |
| Tuscan | Child Jesus in fasce | painting | c. 1510 | Second floor – 2 |
| Pseudo-Jacopino di Francesco | Madonna and Child | painting | c. 1300–1350 | Second floor – 2 |
| Tuscan | Credenza | tapestry | c. 1600–1699 c. | Second floor – 2 |
| Neri di Bicci | Archangel Raphael, Tobias and St Jerome | painting | c. 1450–1492 | Second floor – 2 |
| Tuscan | Cofanetto | tapestry | c. 1800–1899 | Second floor – 2 |
| South-Central Italian | Table | tapestry | c. 1600–1699 | Second floor – 2 |
