= Allegory of Music =

Painting by Dosso Dossi

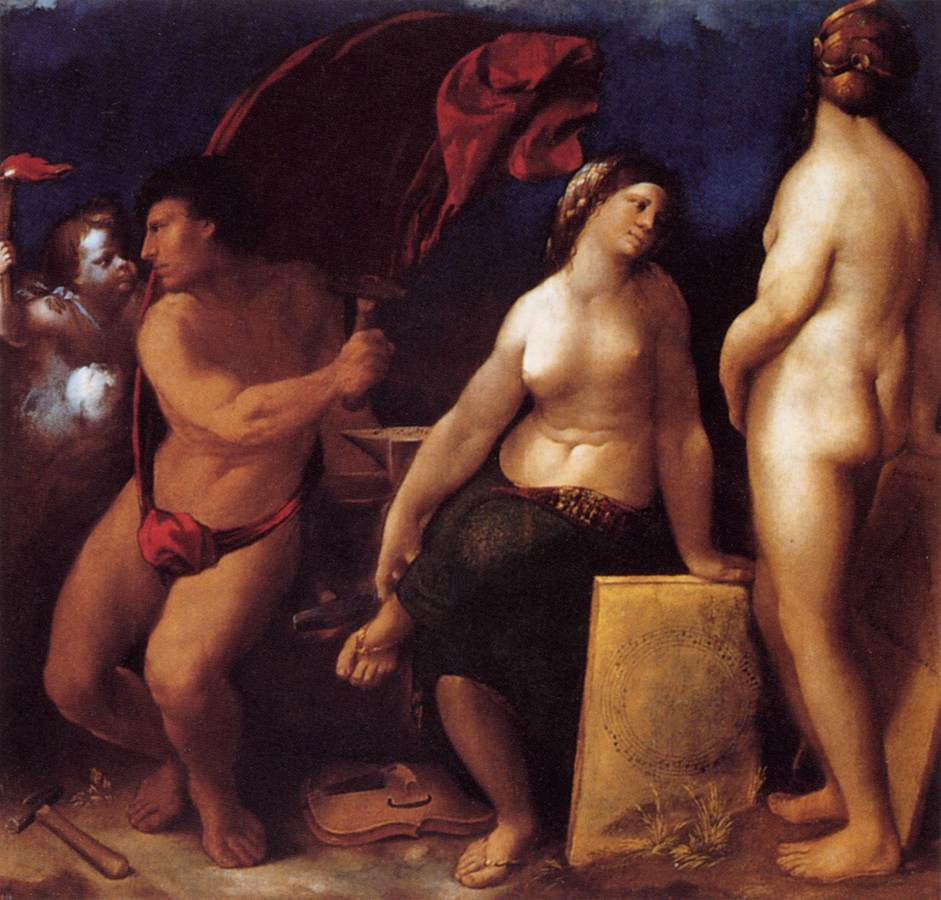
- Year: 1530s
- Dimensions: 196 cm (77 in) × 187 cm (74 in)

Allegory of Music is a painting by the Italian Renaissance painter Dosso Dossi, executed in the 1530s and now in the Museo Horne in Florence. It was restored in 1993.

It was painted for the court of Alfonso I d'Este in Ferrara and was part of Lucrezia d'Este's dowry when she married Francesco Maria II Della Rovere, Duke of Urbino. On the fall of Ferrara, Cardinal Cinzio Aldobrandini seized it and took it to Rome. It was later inherited by the Borghese family, in whose family inventories it appeared as a work by Giorgione in 1693. It was finally bought from an art dealer in Florence by Herbert Horne in 1912 for 2000 lira. Roberto Longhi reattributed it to Dosso's mature phase and more recently it has been assigned to the 1530s due to stylistic similarities with the Myth of Pan in the Getty Museum and the Sant' Andrea di Ferrara Altarpiece.

== Bibliography ==
- Battistini, Matilde (2002), Simboli e Allegorie (in Italian), Milano: Electa, ISBN 9788843581740
- Nardinocchi, Elisabetta, ed. (2011), Guida al Museo Horne (in Italian), Florence: Edizioni Polistampa, ISBN 978-88-596-0969-8
