= Santa Maria Maggiore, Florence =

Roman Catholic church in Florence

Coordinates: 43°46′23.77″N 11°15′11.04″E

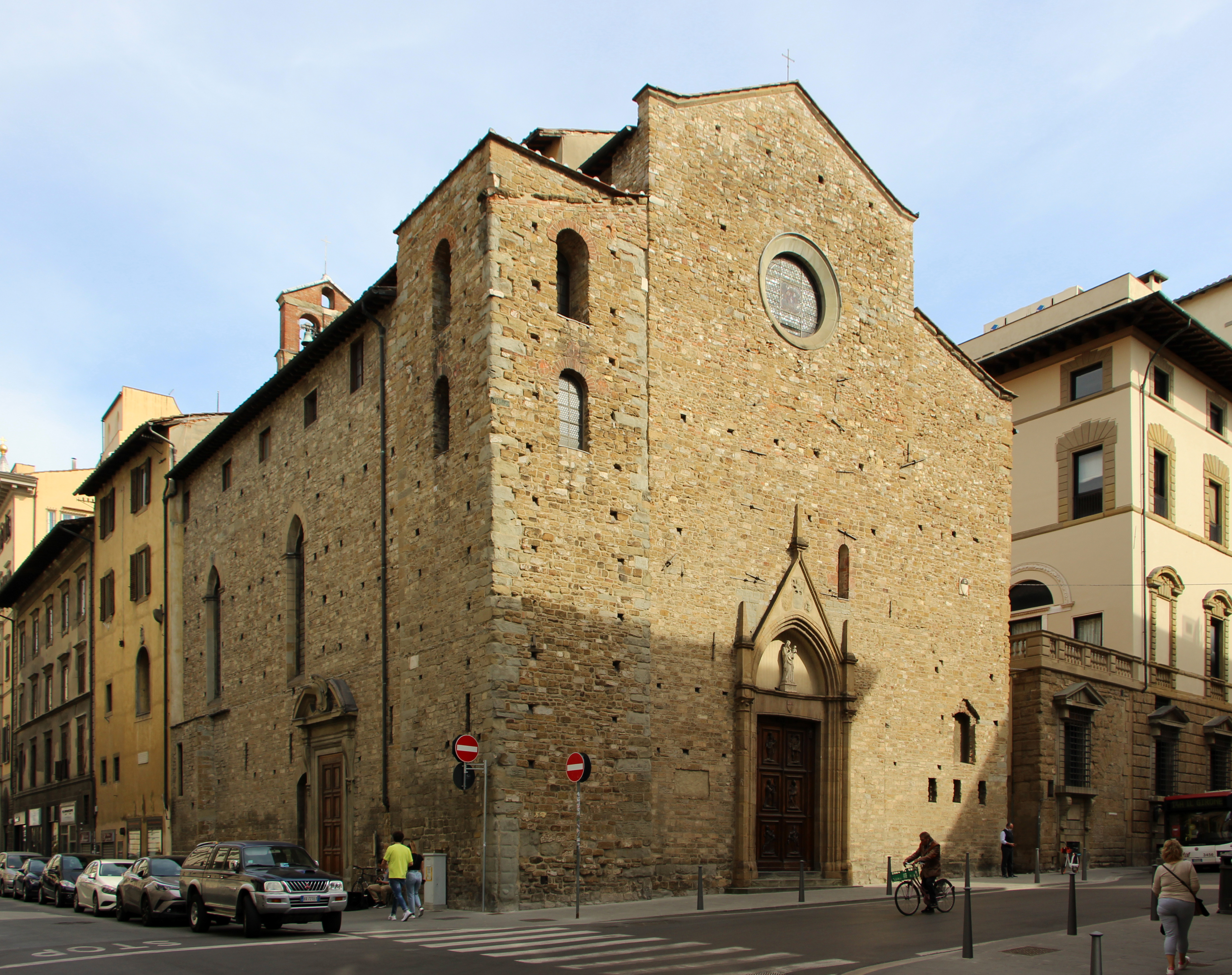
Facade of Santa Maria Maggiore di Firenze

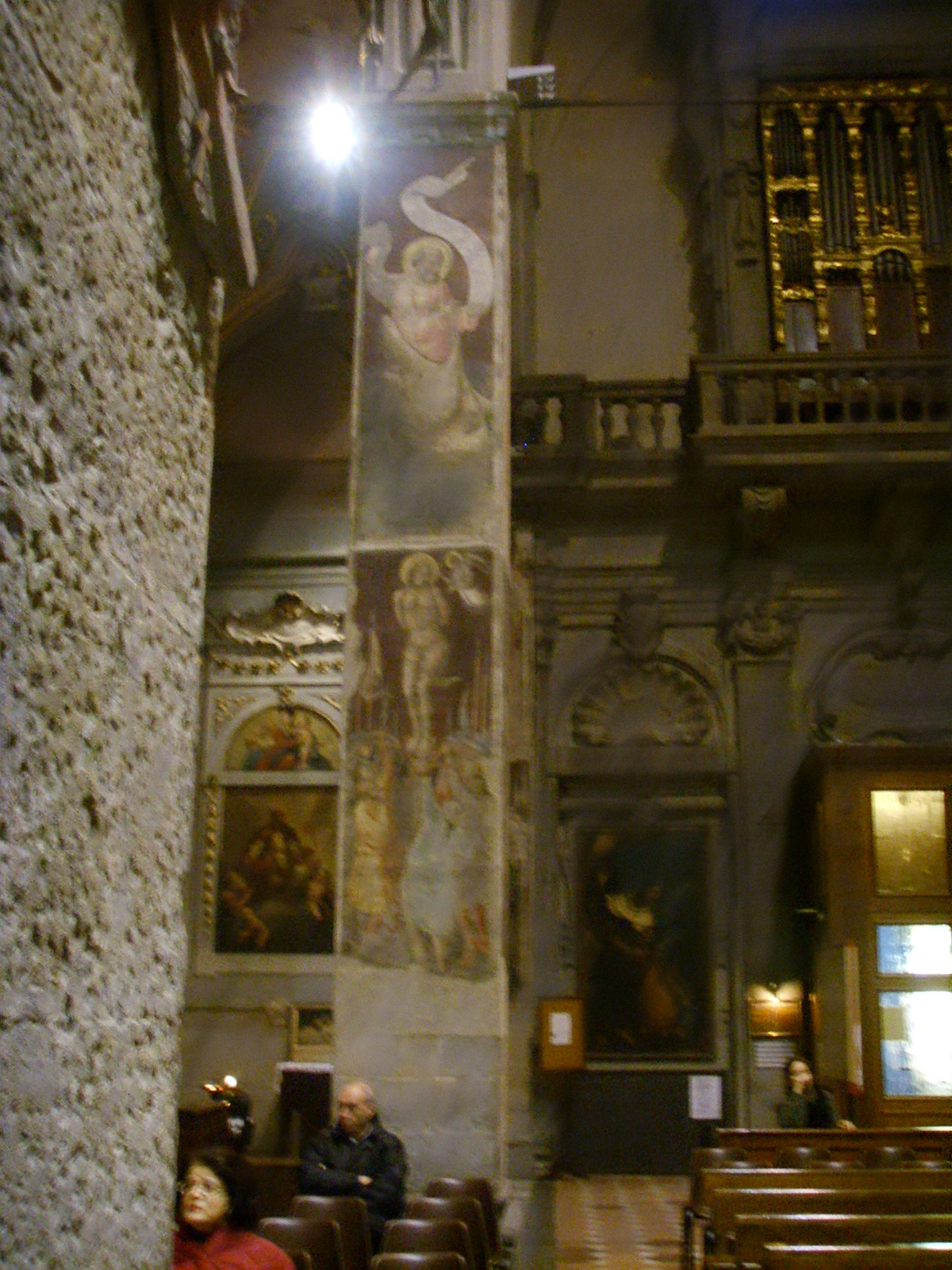
Frescoed pilaster in the rear area.

Santa Maria Maggiore di Firenze is a Romanesque and Gothic-style, Roman Catholic church in Florence, region of Tuscany, Italy. This is among the oldest extant churches in Florence.

== History ==
The church was originally constructed in the 11th century and underwent extensive renovations to the facade and sides in the 13th century.

The original church existed as early as the 8th century, and is first documented in 931. The legend assigning its foundation to Pope Pelagius II in 580 A.D. is not reliable.

In 1176 it obtained the status of collegiate church and was one of Florence's priories. The church subsequently expanded its possessions and in 1183 it was put under papal direct protection by Lucius III in 1186, which it kept in the following century. Acquired by the Cistercians, in the 13th century the church was rebuilt (with the exception of the original external walls and the vaults) in Gothic style. Giorgio Vasari mentions one "Master Buono" as the designer of the new edifice; he also writes that the high altar had a Coronation of the Virgin by Agnolo Gaddi, and the Cappella Maggiore contained frescoes by Spinello Aretino with the Stories of the Virgin and St. Antony Abbot, of which today only a fragment survives.

During the 15th century the church's finances declined: in 1514 Giulio de' Medici describes it as decaying, and in the following year the pope gave it to the Florence Cathedral's capitol. In 1521 it went to the Carmelites from Mantua. In the early 17th century the interior was restored by Gherardo Silvani, perhaps following a project by Bernardo Buontalenti.

== Description ==
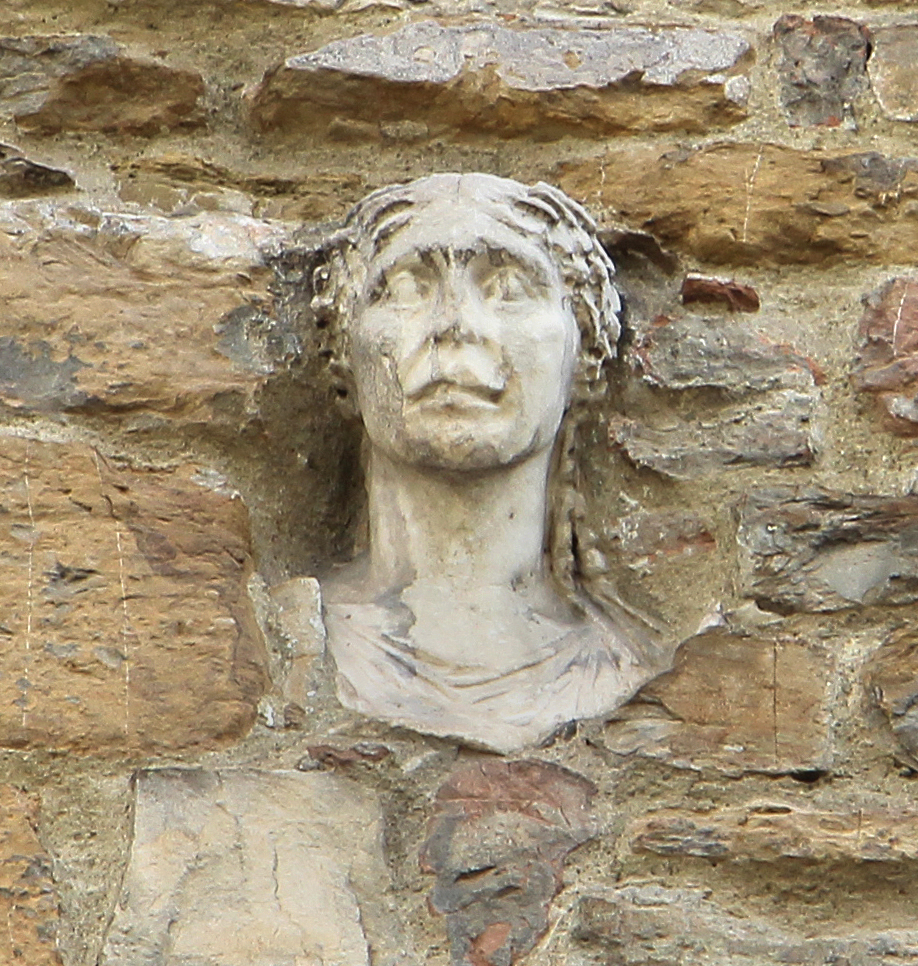
La Berta

The exterior is rather undecorated, with stone walls and the portals surmounted by tympani. The bell tower, although reduced in height, survives from the Romanesque building. It has a Roman head embedded in its walls, popularly known as la Berta

The interior is simple with a nave and two aisles, ogival arches and groin vaults. Artworks include frescoes by Bernardino Poccetti (Histories of St. Zenobius in the vault), a Nativity by Matteo Rosselli, and, above the altar of the left transept chapel, a polychromed stucco relief panel, the Madonna del Carmelo, long attributed to the 13th century artist, Coppo di Marcovaldo. A recent restoration has caused scholars to question this attribution and posit an earlier, 12th century date for the panel. The same chapel houses the tomb of Brunetto Latini, discovered in 1751, and a sarcophagus attributed to Tino di Camaino (early 14th century).

Other artworks once housed in the church include the Carnesecchi Triptych, by Masolino da Panicale and Masaccio, as well as the Martyrdom of St. Sebastian and the Lamentation over the Dead Christ with Saints by Botticelli.

== Sources ==
- M. Ciatti and C. Frosinini, ed. (2002). L'immagine antica della Madonna col Bambino di Santa Maria Maggiore. Studi e restauro. Florence: Edifir.
