= Pietà (Filippo Lippi, Florence) =

15th century painting by Filippo Lippi

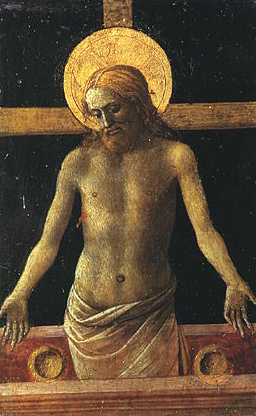
Pietà (c. 1430–1435) by Filippo Lippi

Pietà is a tempera on wood painting by Filippo Lippi, which was created c. 1430–1435. It is in the collection of the Museo Horne, Florence.

== History ==
The work, a pace, is mentioned at the end of the 19th century as a work by Masaccio. It was purchased at the beginning of the 20th century by Herbert Horne, and, shortly afterwards, Pietro Toesca was the first to recognize it as a work of Filippo Lippi in an unpublished attribution of 1921. It was also confirmed during the exhibition Lorenzo the Magnificent and the Arts (Collobi-Ragghianti, 1949) and finally in the catalog of the exhibition The Age of Masaccio (Florence, 1990). Dating has always represented a difficult problem: some attribute the work to a youthful phase of Lippi, still influenced by Masaccio, others to the years of 1435–1440, based on the refinement of some details such as the description of the sarcophagus and the treatment of Christ's hair.

== Description and style ==
The iconography of Christ is traditional, depicted as he rises from the tomb with his arms outstretched and showing the signs of the Passion. The naturalistic notations of the body reveal the hand of a master, as well as the strong chiaroscuro that shapes the musculature. The background is dark, with the cross behind Christ.
