= Deposition of Christ (Gozzoli) =

Painting by Benozzo Gozzoli

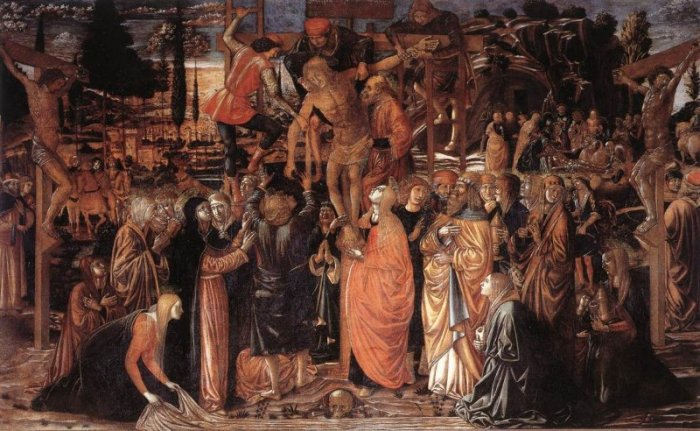
- Year: c. 1491
- Dimensions: 180 cm (71 in) × 300 cm (120 in)

Deposition of Christ, also known as Descent from the Cross, is a painting from approximately 1491 by Benozzo Gozzoli. Among Gozzoli's last works, it was still unfinished in his studio by the time of his death. Years later his heirs sold it to the Diocese of Pistoia. It then passed to the Sozzifanti family, from whom it was later inherited by Charles Borbone, Duke of Lucca. It was bought by Herbert Horne in 1907 and now in the Museo Horne in Florence. It was restored in 1990.
