= Brooklyn, Enfield =

Building in Enfield, London, England

Coordinates: 51.6456°N 0.0792°W

Brooklyn at 8 Private Road, Enfield, is a detached house built between 1883 and 1887 by the architect Arthur Heygate Mackmurdo. It has been listed Grade II on the National Heritage List for England since February 1970.

The house was designed by Mackmurdo for his brother in 1883. He also designed Halcyon (No. 6) in 1874 in a half-timbered style for his mother, but that house was demolished in 1968. Brooklyn's flat roof and regular shape were considered very daring and innovative when it was built and caused considerable comment.

The style of the house foreshadows many architectural trends that would become prominent in Modernism and Art Deco several decades later. Finn Jensen in his book Modernist Semis and Terraces in England, describes Brooklyn as "essentially in a Classical style but unlike any other private dwellings of the period". Nikolaus Pevsner highlighted the house's flat roof and horizontal windows in his 1960 book, Pioneers of Modern Design. Pevsner describes Brooklyn as the "only European parallel" to the White House, E. W. Godwin's 1878 house for James McNeill Whistler in Tite Street, Chelsea. The Twentieth Century Society has described Brooklyn as "proto-Modern".
