= Selwyn Image =

British artist, designer, writer and poet (1849–1930)

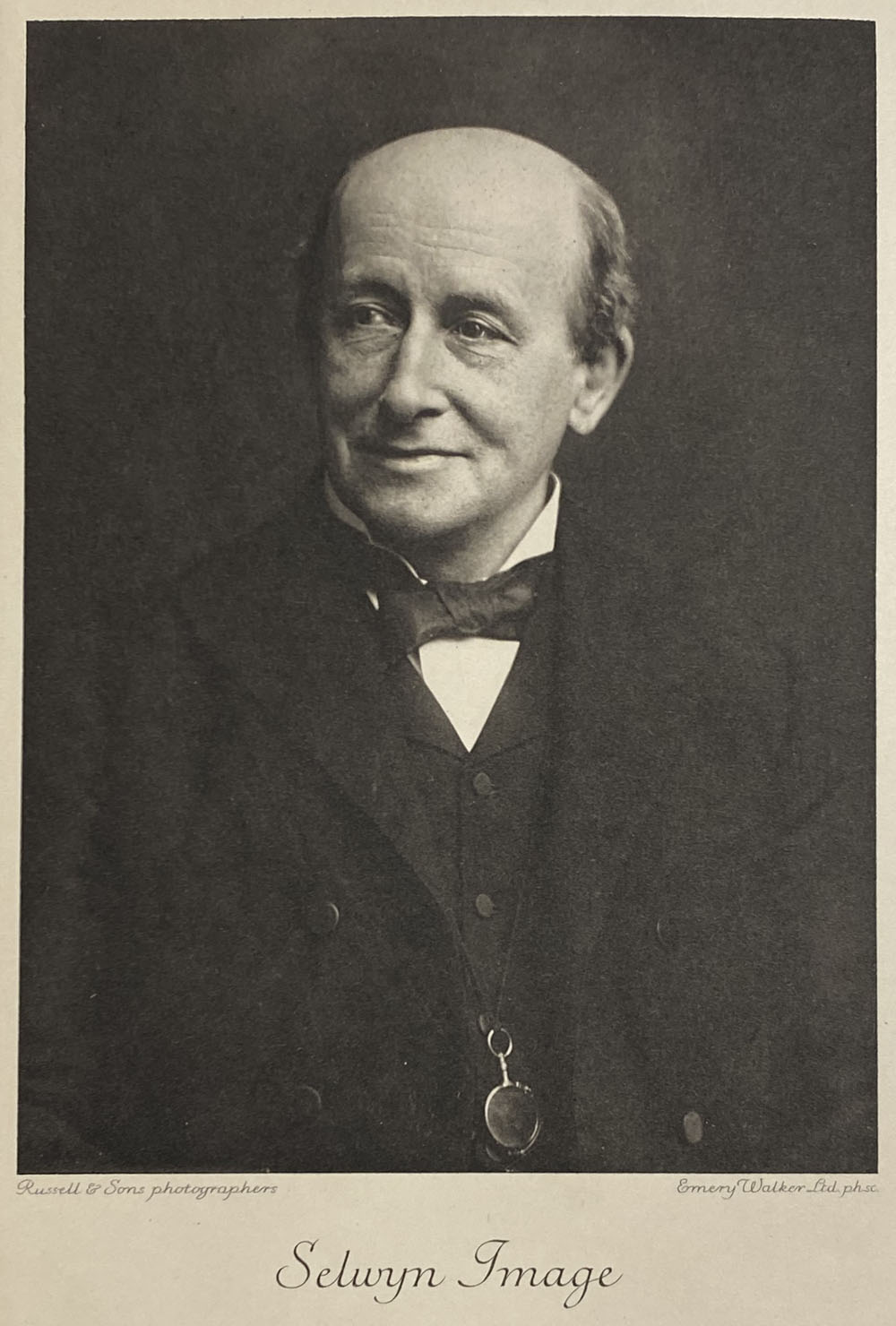
- Selwyn Image in 1900
- Born: 17 February 1849; Bodiam, Sussex
- Died: 21 August 1930 (aged 81); Holloway, London
- Resting place: Highgate Cemetery, London
- Known for: Stained glass design, book illustration, writing and poetry
- Movement: Arts and Crafts Movement
- Spouse: Janet Image

Selwyn Image (17 February 1849, Bodiam, Sussex – 21 August 1930, London) was a British artist, designer, writer and poet associated with the Arts and Crafts Movement. He designed stained glass windows, furniture and embroidery, and illustrated books. He was the seventh Slade Professor of Fine Art at the University of Oxford from 1910 to 1916.

== Early life and education ==
Selwyn Image was born in Bodiam, Sussex, on 17 February 1849 to the Reverend John Image (c. 1802–1878), vicar of Bodiam and Mary Maxwell (née Hinds c. 1807–1857). He attended Marlborough College and New College, Oxford, in 1868 where he studied drawing under John Ruskin. Intending on entering the clergy and following his father as Vicar of Bodiam, Image took Holy Orders at the age of 24. He was ordained deacon in 1872 and priest the next year. He was a curate at Tottenham and later at St. Anne's, Soho. Image began studying art with A. H. Mackmurdo and Ruskin's assistant, Arthur Burgess in 1880. Image eventually abandoned the clergy in 1882.

== Century Guild of Artists and Art Workers' Guild ==
Image was associated with the Century Guild of Artists in London, founded by prominent architect and designer A. H. Mackmurdo and Herbert Percy Horne. With Mackmurdo. He established the Guild's workshops which produced furniture, wallpaper, primarily domestic design such as furniture, stained glass, metalwork and decorative painting. He co-edited the Guild's magazine, The Hobby Horse, from 1886 to 1892. He was an active member of the Art Workers' Guild in London and became a Master of the guild in 1900.

== Stained glass designer ==
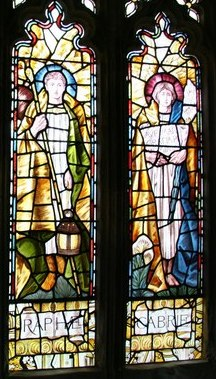

One of Image's first stained glass designs, The Seasons, manufactured by James Powell & Sons, was exhibited at the Paris International Exhibition in 1878. Image's designs were influenced by the work of William Morris. Image's early designs, composed of individual figures against a floral background, was inspired by Morris's previous work. Image described one of Morris & Co. earliest stained glass commissions, one of a pair of two-light windows (1862) depicting the four archangels at St. Michael and All Angels church in Brighton 'as one of the finest modern windows I know of.'" The early window, designed by Ford Madox Brown was the inspiration for Image's Archangel window at St Mary's Church in Mortehoe.

The basis of Image's stained glass design was a "simplicity of treatment, not only in figure drawing and ornament—which closely match his contemporary graphic work, such as for the Century Guild The Hobby Horse—but also in the use of leading. In an article published in The Hobby Horse in 1890, Image expounded his principles of stained glass design, emphasizing that qualities of 'richness and brilliance of effect ... in no small measure depend upon the management of the leads'".

Image and well-known stained glass artist Christopher Whall met in the 1880s and became lasting friends. Whall and Image were among the earliest pioneers and important contributors to the Arts and Crafts Movement. Image designed fewer than thirty windows during his career, but a number of cartoons (designs) were displayed at Arts and Crafts Exhibitions. Several of Image's designs were illustrated in books and magazines where Image acquired a wide following. Christopher Whall included one of Image's cartoons in his influential manual Stained Glass Work (1905), "as an example of the 'simple and severe' style of drawing best suited to the medium".

Image was influential in the work of a number of stained glass artists, including two women: Mary J. Newill (1860–1947) and Helen Coombe (1864–1937). Mary J. Newill was a talented artist-craftsman who trained at the Birmingham Municipal School of Art in the 1880s and 1890s. Helen Coombe was a student of Image, and her design for the Mary and Martha window was displayed at the 1896 Arts and Crafts Exhibition and showed the influence of Image as artistic mentor.

== Writer, lecturer and poet ==
Image was an influential writer on design and the first Slade Professor of Fine Arts at Oxford (1910 to 1916). He published a number of essays and contributed introductions and chapters to scholarly publications.

Between December 1887 and February 1888, Image gave a series of four lectures on modern art at Willis' Rooms. Oscar Wilde attended at least the second lecture, which he reviewed in The Sunday Times on 25 January 1888.

Image also wrote poetry, which he eventually collected in his 1894 book Poems and Carols.

== Other work ==
Image's line-block design for the cover of the inaugural 1884 issue of the Hobby Horse, the Guild's publication, is widely known. Other celebrated works include the design of embroideries for the Royal School of Needlework and bookbindings such as that for the novel Stefania (1893).

In 1900, Image was hired as a designer for the Glasgow furniture manufacturer, Wylie and Lochead.

== Death and legacy ==
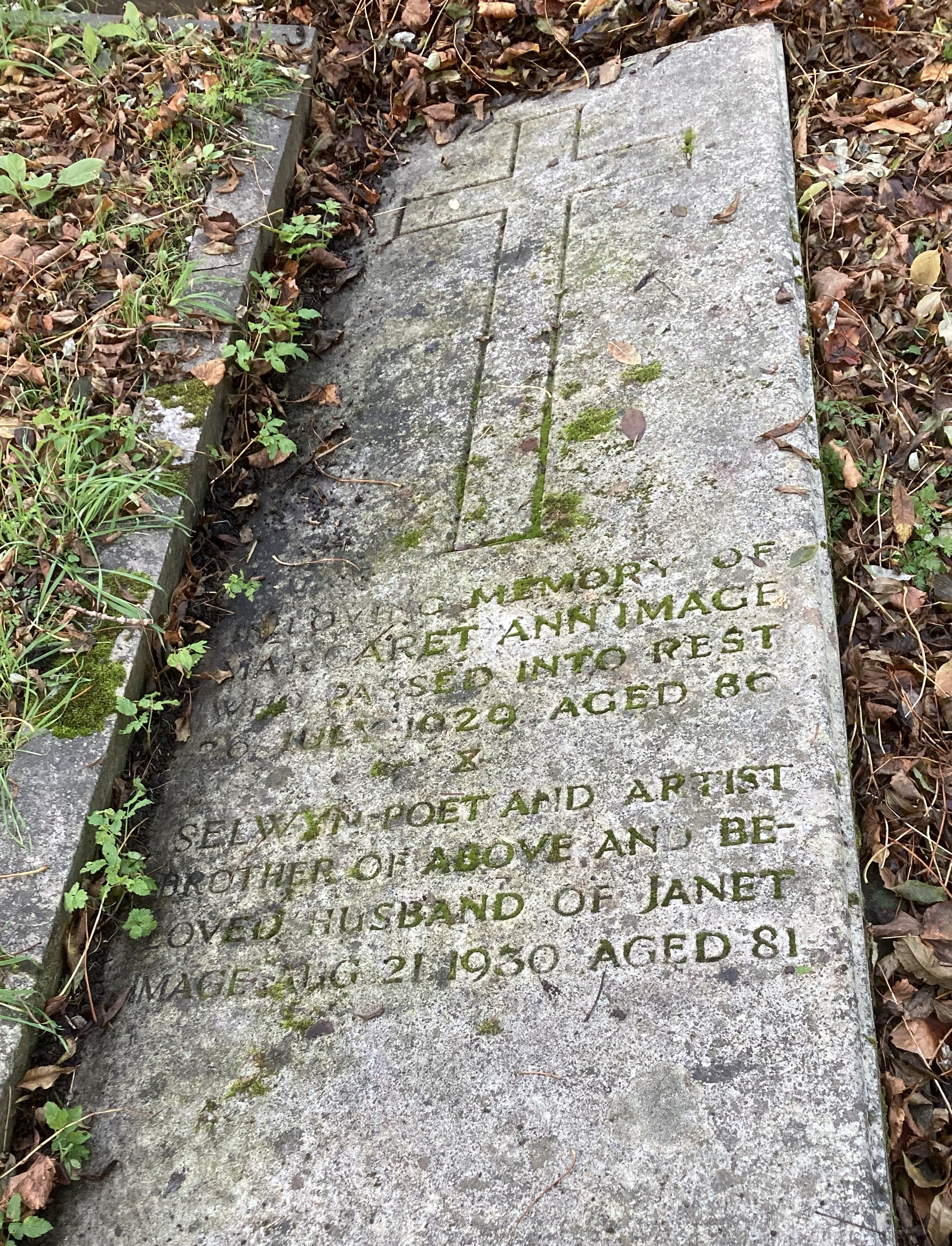
Grave of Selwyn Image in Highgate Cemetery

Image died at Holloway on 21 August 1930 and was buried on the eastern side of Highgate Cemetery. Two years after his death, selected poems and later his letters, edited by Mackmurdo was published.

== Stained glass work ==
- St Mary's, Mortehoe, Devon (1888)
- Wise Virgins, St. Michael and All Angels, Waterford, Hertfordshire (1888)
- Archangels, St. Cuthbert's church, Darlington, Durham, England (1889)
- St. Peter's Church, Cranbourne, Berkshire
- Angels & Transfiguration, St. Andrew's, Much Hadham, Hertfordshire (1891)
- Brownies, Solham House, Newmarket (1895), (currently on display at the Victoria and Albert Museum)
- St. Luke's Church, Camberwell

== Selected publications ==
- Image, Selwyn (1894). Poems and Carols (1894). London: E. Matthews. p. 47.
- Image, Selwyn (1929). Some Reflections on the Art of Thomas Rowlandson & George Morland. London: Print Collector's Club.
- Mackmurdo, Arthur Heygate, ed. (1932). The Poems of Selwyn Image (1st ed.). London: Elkin, Matthews and Marrot.
- Poems (1932), edited by Arthur Heygate Mackmurdo
- Mackmurdo, Arthur Heygate, ed. (1932). Selwyn Image Letters. London: Grant Richards Pronto Limited. p. 219.
- Miles, Alfred H. (2011). The Sacred Poets of the Nineteenth Century Edward Hayes Plumptre to Selwyn Image. BiblioLife. p. 440. ISBN 978-1113886460.

== See also ==
- Vienna Café
