= Century Guild of Artists =

The Century Guild of Artists was an English group of art enthusiasts that were active between c.1883 and 1892. Their work was primarily based on 18th century motifs, though some work was Art Nouveau in style.

== History ==
The Guild was founded in 1882 by Arthur Heygate Mackmurdo with the aim of preserving the artistic trade and the authenticity of the craftsmen behind it. The members were one of the first groups of the Arts and Crafts Movement, which aimed to unify the arts. Roughly 20 people were associated with the guild, but the only members were Arthur Heygate Mackmurdo, Herbert Horne and Selwyn Image.

The Guild primarily produced domestic design such as furniture, stained glass, metalwork, decorative painting and architectural design. These designs were all displayed at the Inventions Exhibition (London, 1885), the Exhibition of Navigation and Manufacture (Liverpool, 1886), Pownall Hall (1886–7; Cheshire) and the Royal Jubilee Exhibition (Manchester, 1887).

Despite inconsistent output, the group gained recognition through exhibiting and through their quarterly magazine called The Century Guild Hobby Horse which ran from 1884–1892. The journal was then renamed The Hobby Horse, and continued for another two years before it ended in 1894. The Hobby Horse served as a way of sharing the views of the Guild and promoted crafted art as opposed to mechanical industry.

== Influence ==
The Guild influenced designers such as C.F.A. Voysey and Charles Rennie Mackintosh and influenced the formation of The Arts and Crafts Exhibition Society.
