= Putti Bearing a Tondo Showing the Drunkenness of Noah =

Painting by Domenico Beccafumi

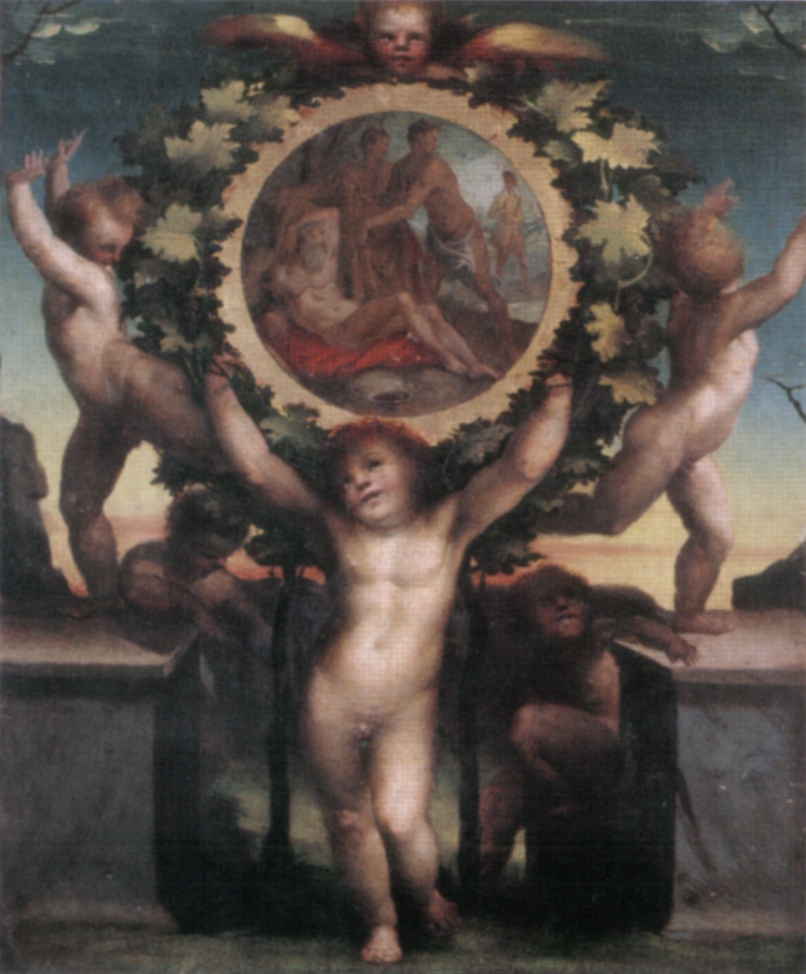
- Artist: Domenico Beccafumi
- Year: c. 1522–1523
- Medium: Oil on board
- Dimensions: 74 cm × 67 cm (29 in × 26 in)
- Location: Museo Horne, Florence

Putti Bearing a Tondo Showing the Drunkenness of Noah is an oil painting on panel executed c. 1522–1523 by the Italian Renaissance painter Domenico Beccafumi.

It was recorded in the Medici inventories in the 17th century and derives from an incomplete composition now in the Monte dei Paschi's collections in Siena. The work is now in the Museo Horne in Florence.

== Bibliography ==
- Anna Maria Francini Ciaranfi, Beccafumi, Sadea Editore/Sansoni, Firenze 1967.
- Elisabetta Nardinocchi (a cura di), Guida al Museo Horne, Edizioni Polistampa, Firenze 2011. ISBN 978-88-596-0969-8
