= Saint Stephen (Giotto) =

Painting by Giotto

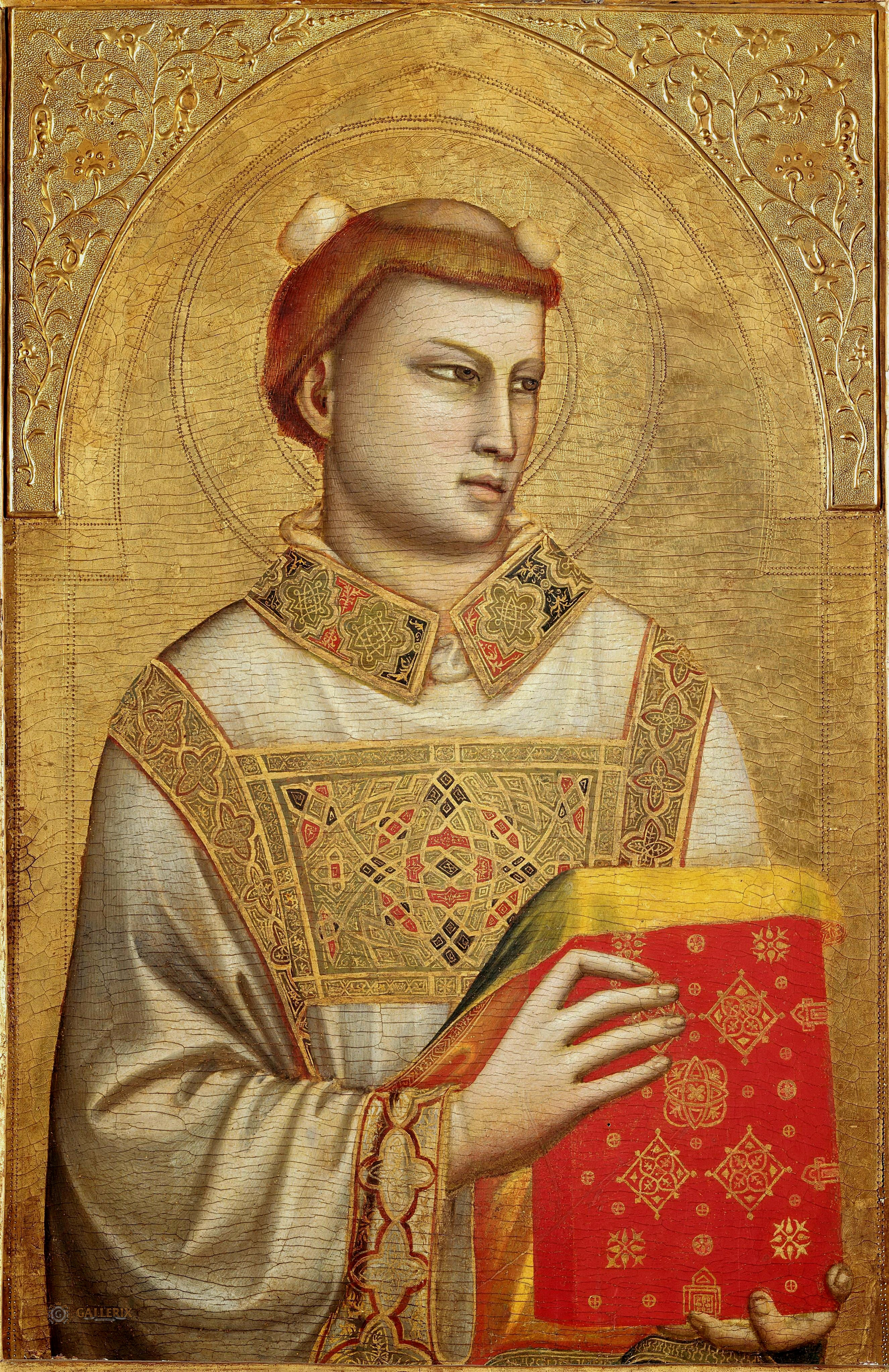
- Year: 1320
- Dimensions: 84 cm (33 in) × 54 cm (21 in)
- Location: Italy

Saint Stephen is a panel painting by Giotto, dating to around 1330–1335. It is painted in tempera on gold ground. It is in the collection of and serves as the logo of the Museo Horne in Florence.

== Bibliography ==
- Tazartes, Maurizia (2004), Giotto (in Italian), Milan: Rizzoli, ISBN 9788817004480
- Baccheschi, Edi (1977), L'opera completa di Giotto (in Italian), Milan: Rizzoli, ISBN 9782080112194
