= Saint Catherine of Alexandria (Signorelli) =

Painting by Luca Signorelli

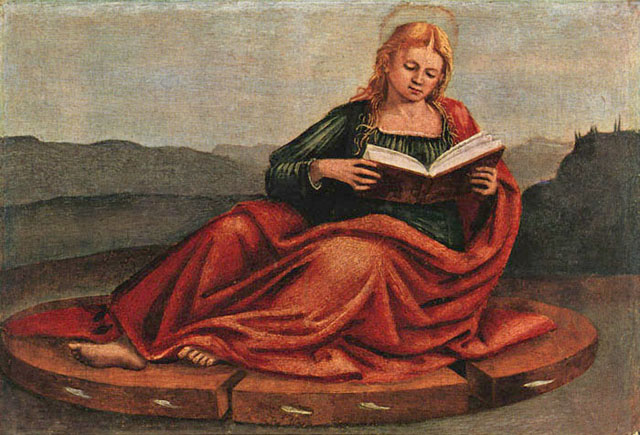
Saint Catherine of Alexandria (c. 1512) by Luca Signorelli

Saint Catherine of Alexandria is a tempera on panel painting, created c. 1512 by Luca Signorelli. It is a fragment from the predella of a lost altarpiece. It is now in the Museo Horne in Florence.

== Sources ==
- http://www.polomuseale.firenze.it/catalogo/scheda.asp?nctn=00287594&value=1
