= Holy Family with the Infant John the Baptist and a Donor =

Painting by Domenico Beccafumi

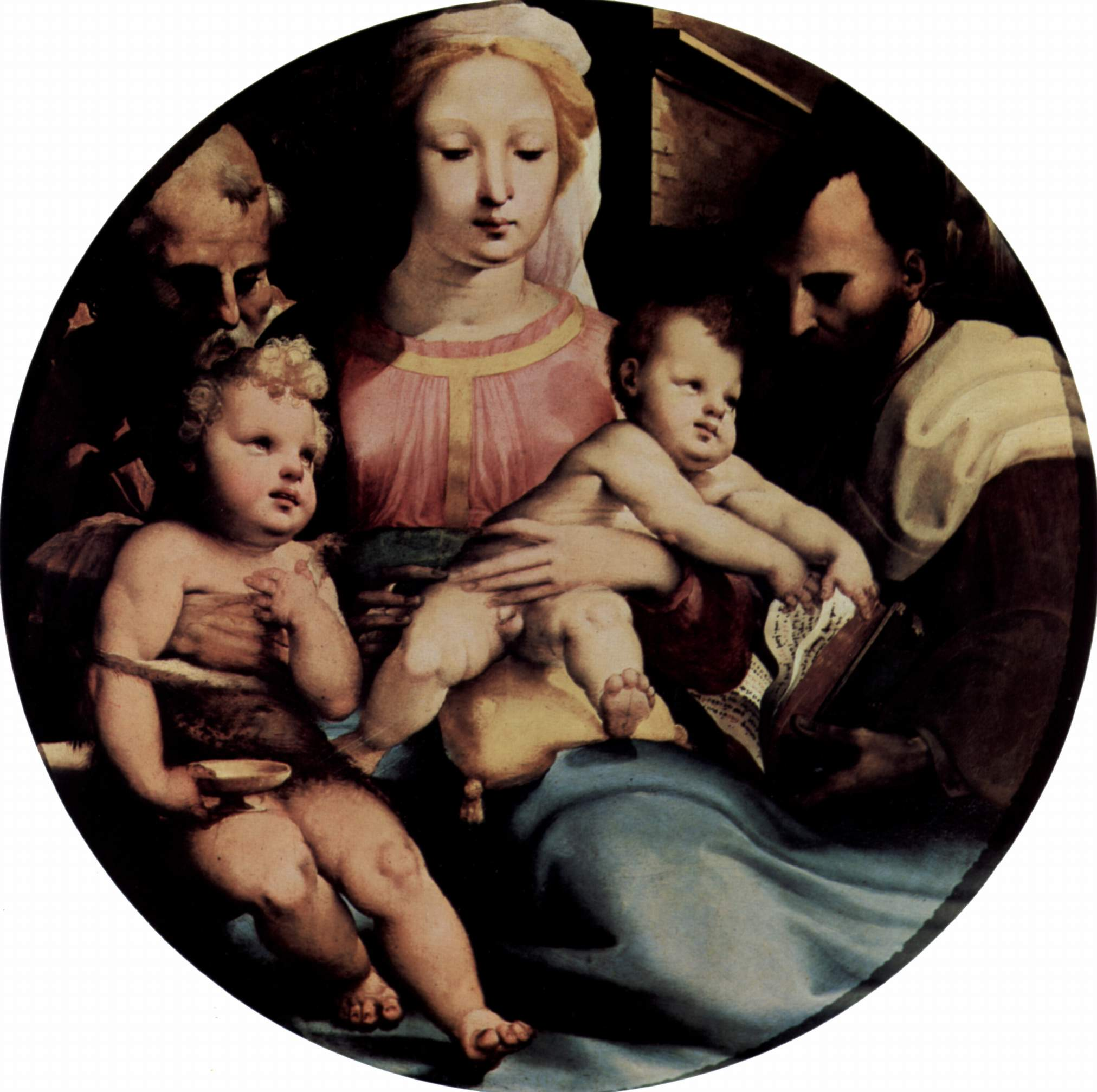
Holy Family with the Infant John the Baptist and a Donor (c. 1528) by Domenico Beccafumi

Holy Family with the Infant John the Baptist and a Donor is an oil painting on panel executed c. 1528 by the Italian Renaissance painter Domenico Beccafumi. It is a tondo measuring 140 cm in diameter, and is now in the Museo Horne in Florence.

== History and description ==
The work was purchased by the Horne Foundation after the death of its founder, in 1934, when there was the Bengujat auction of the furnishings of the Davanzati Palace. The tondo was probably previously owned by the Marquises Durazzo Spinola of Genoa.

Stylistically close to San Michele in the Church of San Nicolò al Carmine, it shares an approach similar to other works, such as the one in the Doria Pamphili Gallery or the one in the Marri Mignanelli Collection in Sinalunga.

The space of the tondo is exploited to perfection by the sacred group, centered on the figure of the Child who opens a book in the hands of a man, probably the client, to whom he also turns an intense gaze. Jesus is in the hands of Mary seated and on the left appear Joseph, emerging from the shadows, and St. John, recognizable by the bowl with which he carried out the baptism. The intertwining of gestures and glances between the figures recalls the classical models of Raphael and the Florentine painters, combined with Beccafumi's very particular sense of color and light.

The carved frame with high-relief heads recalls that of the Tondo Doni and refers to the activity of Giovanni Barilli.
