= Life of Esther =

Series of paintings by Sandro Botticelli and Filippino Lippi

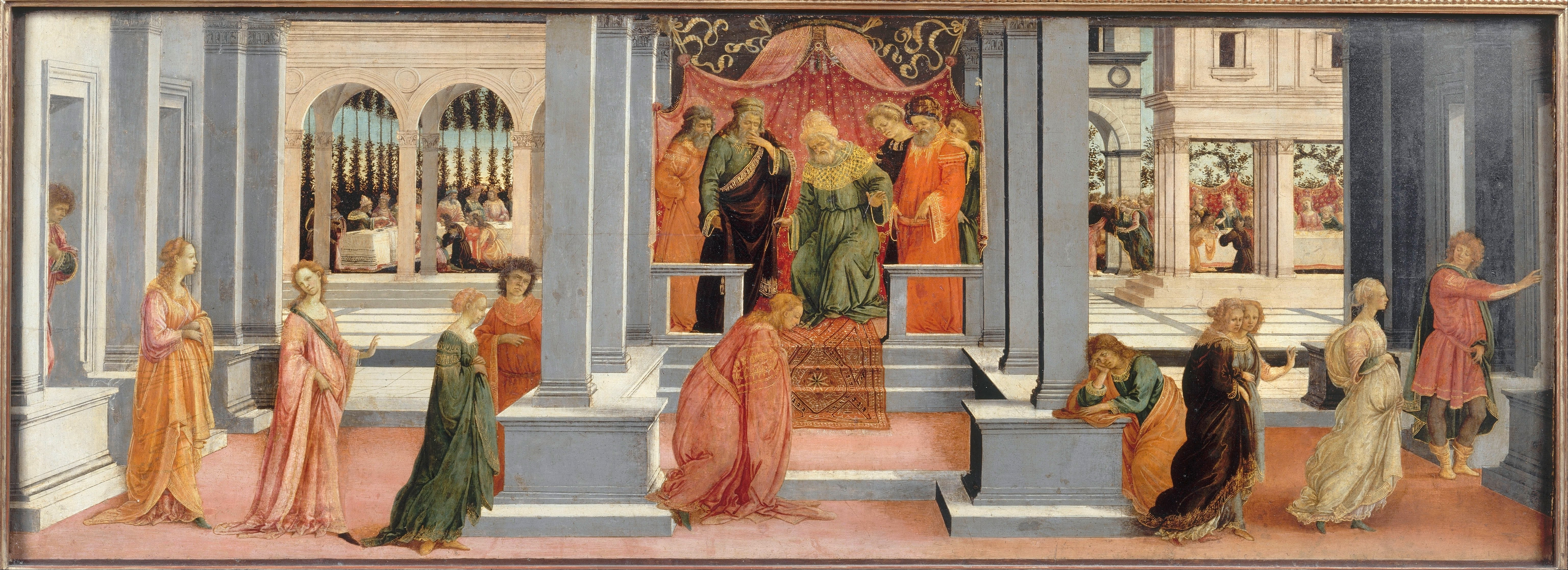
Ahasuerus Chooses Esther, 47 × 131 cm, Musée Condé, Chantilly

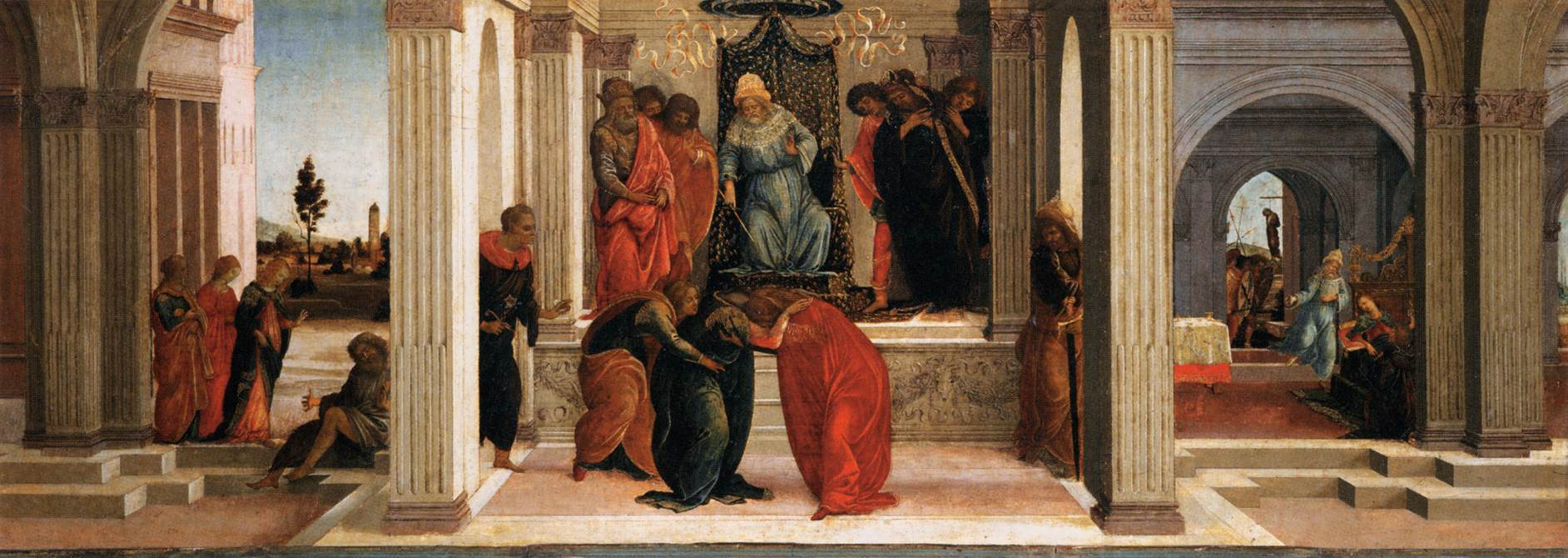
The three scenes in the Louvre, Mordecai Lamenting; Esther Faints Before Ahasuerus; Haman Begs For Mercy In Vain, and Haman is hung in the background.

Life of Esther or Scenes from the Story of Esther is the title of a series of six panel paintings by the Italian Renaissance painters Sandro Botticelli and Filippino Lippi, showing scenes from the story of Esther and produced in the 1470s. They originally decorated the sides of a pair of cassoni or marriage chests, the two long panels on the fronts, and the smaller ones on the ends. They are now split between five museums in Europe and Canada.

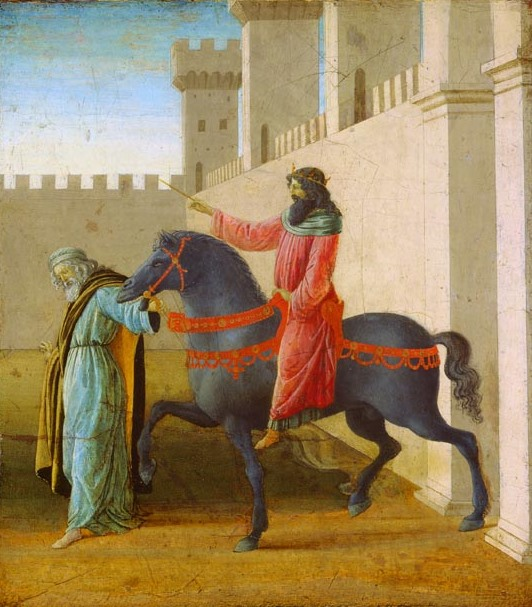
The Triumph of Mordecai, National Gallery of Canada

The authorship of the panels has been much discussed, without firm conclusions being reached. Many accounts divide the works between the two artists, either in terms of the different paintings, or different stages of the work, or both. After his father's death in 1469, Filippino Lippi completed his apprenticeship with Botticelli, and in 1472 was recorded as his assistant. Whether the panel known as La Derelitta, probably by Botticelli, and perhaps rather later than the others, forms part of the series, has also puzzled scholars. The figure is often thought to be female, and a scene of Mordecai weeping is already shown in the Louvre's wide panel.

A recent (2010) study, based on infrared reflectography and x-ray images, shows differences between the style and techniques of the underdrawing, and also differences in the handling of the vanishing points in the perspective of the architecture. There may well have been more than two artists involved. The author concludes that La Derelitta and The Triumph of Mordecai are entirely by Botticelli, and Esther at the Palace Gate perhaps entirely by Lippi. The two wide front panels suggest a design by Botticelli, and some underdrawing, but are probably mostly by Lippi, assisted by another painter in the draperies. Vashti Rejected may be painted by a third, less expert, painter after a cartoon by Botticelli.

== Collections ==
The division between the two cassoni is conjectural, based on the order of events in the biblical story, with the first one mostly covering Esther's part in the story, and the second that of Mordecai. Cassoni were typical wedding gifts, and this partial division into a female and male story would be appropriate for this. Theologians saw the relationship between Esther and Ashuerus as a prefiguration of that between Christ and his church.

=== First cassone ===
- Esther's Arrival in Susa (Esther at the Palace Gate), 48,4 × 43,2 cm, National Gallery of Canada, Ottawa, Inv.60856
- Ahasuerus Chooses Esther, with the feasts of the king (left) and queen (right) in the background. 47 × 131 cm, musée Condé, Chantilly, PE 19, attributed by the museum to Lippi.
- Vashti Rejected, 48,5 × 43,2, Museo Horne, Florence, inv.417

=== Second cassone ===
- La Derelitta, possibly Mordecai Weeping, 47 × 43 cm, Palazzo Pallavicini Rospigliosi, Rome, inv.271
- Three scenes from the story of Esther – Mordecai Lamenting; Esther Faints Before Ahasuerus; Haman Begs For Mercy In Vain, and Haman is hung in the background. 48 × 132 cm, musée du Louvre, Paris, inv.RF1972-138
- The Triumph of Mordecai, 48,3 × 43,2 cm, National Gallery of Canada, inv.60869
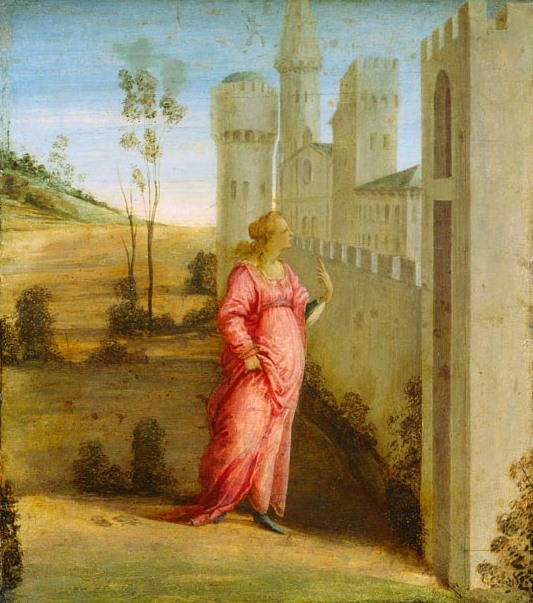
Esther at the Palace Gate

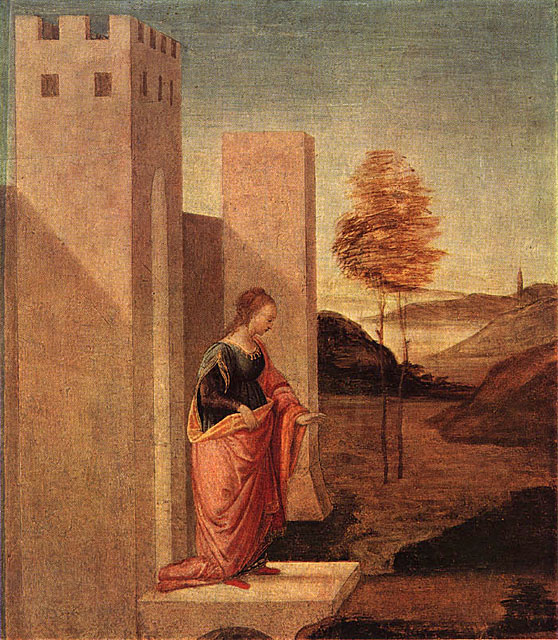
Vashti Rejected

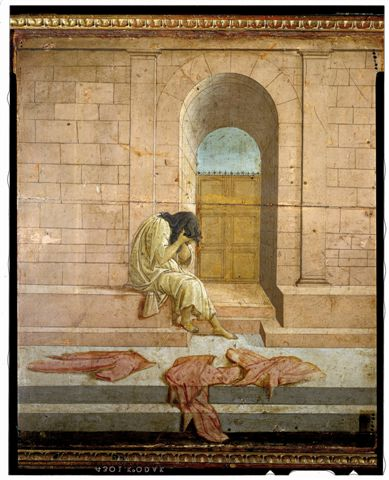
La Derelitta, possibly Mordecai Weeping

== Provenance ==
The original patron and context of the paintings is unknown. The La Derelitta, possibly Mordecai Weeping is first recorded in 1816 in the collection of Prince Giuseppe Rospigliosi (as a work by Masaccio). The other panels were recorded in the 1850s in the Torrigiani collection, and published by Jacob Burckhardt, who attributed them to Lippi, using the designs, and perhaps the underdrawing, of Botticelli.

First cassone

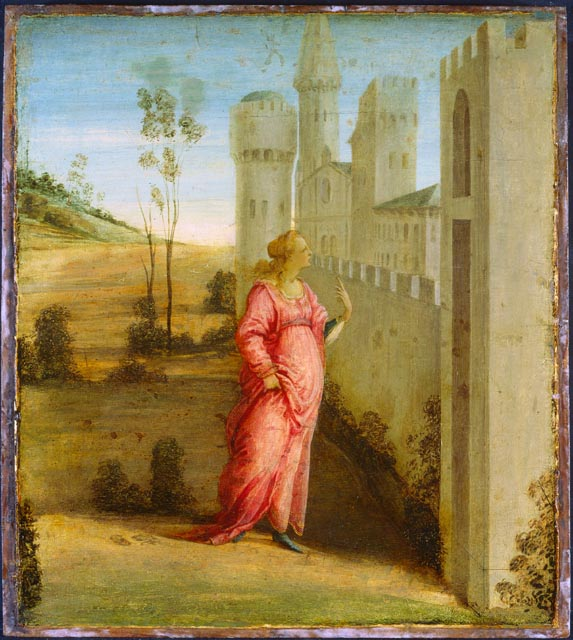

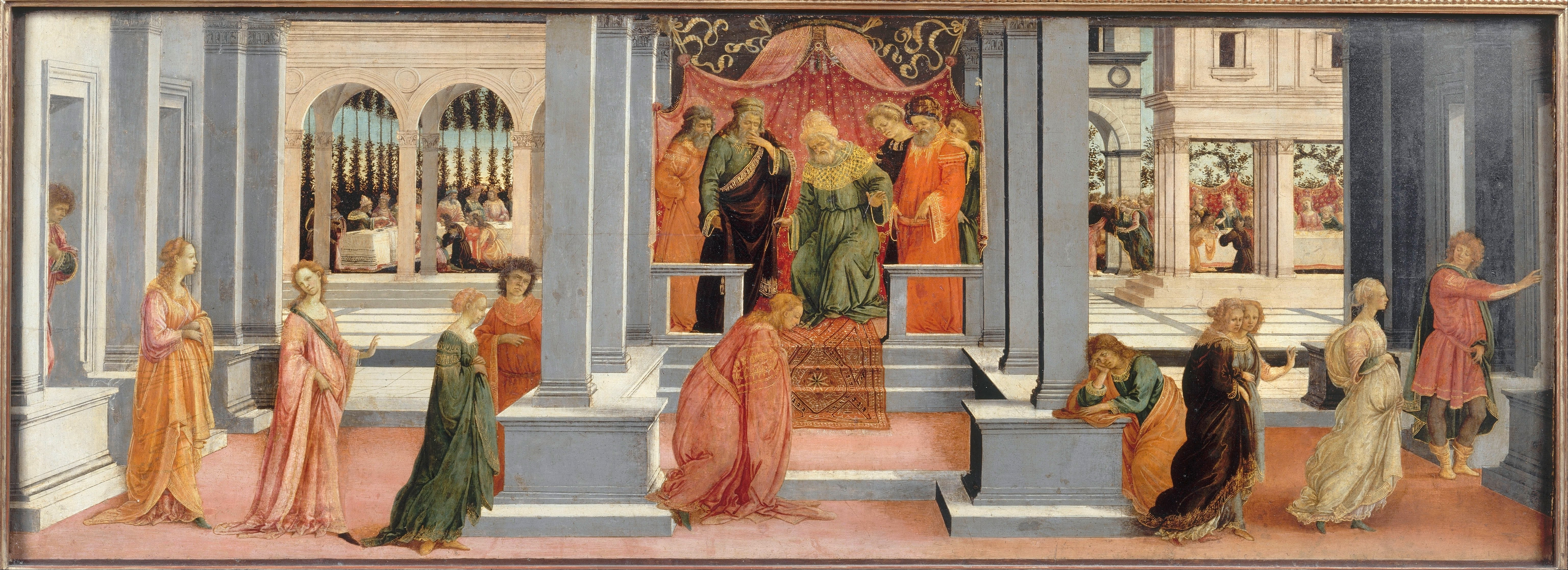

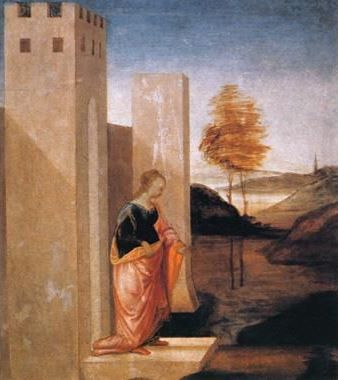
Second cassone

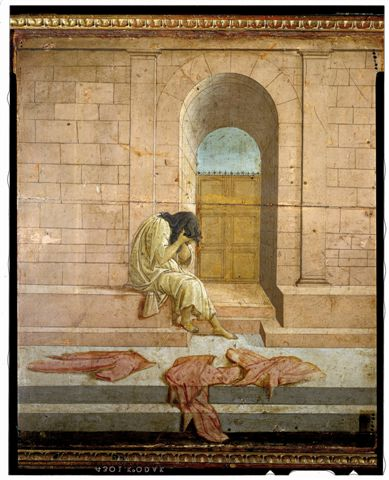

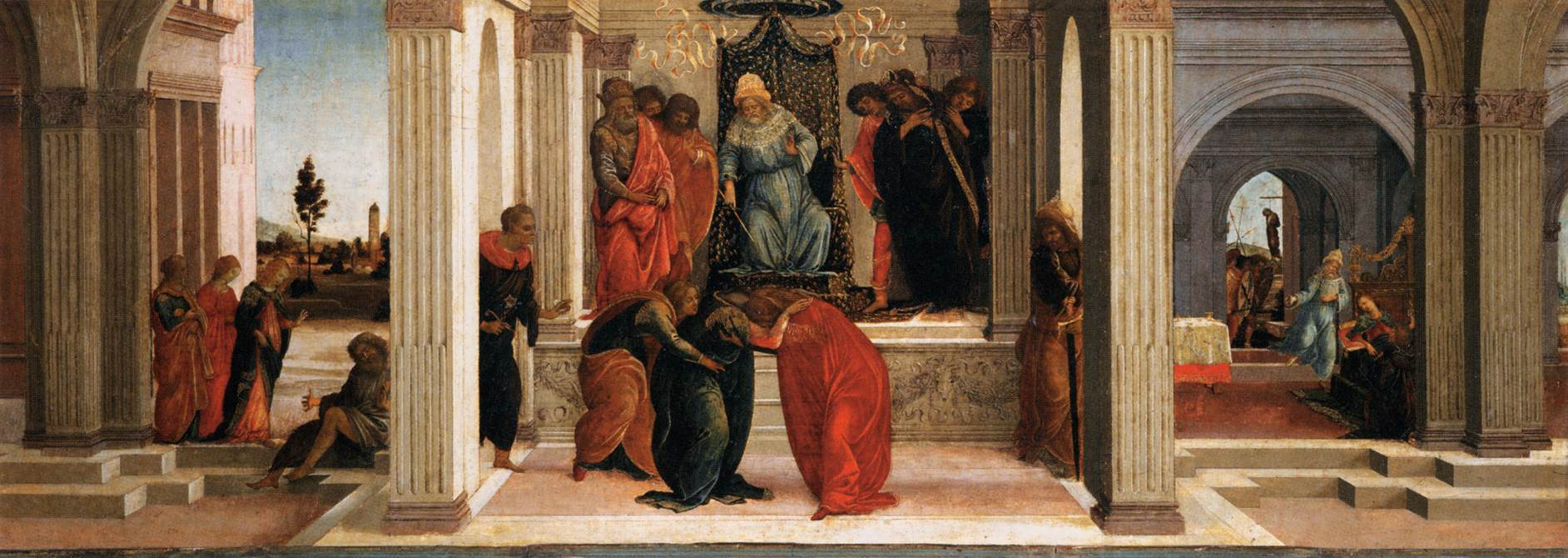

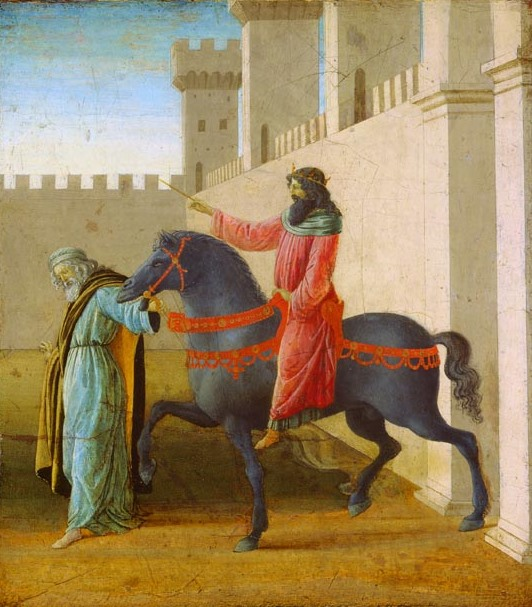

== See also ==
- List of works by Sandro Botticelli

== Bibliography ==
- Markevicius, Tomas, "The Triumph of Mordecai at The National Gallery of Canada: New Findings on Botticelli’s Role and Direct Involvement in Extraordinary Collaboration with Filippino Lippi in the c.1475 Cycle Depicting the Story of Ester", Conference: American Institute for Conservation of Historic and Artistic Works (AIC) 2010 Annual Meeting, Volume: Postprints, Researchgate.net PDF [accessed Jul 14 2018]
- Wind, Edgar, "The Subject of Botticelli's ‘Derelitta.’", Journal of the Warburg and Courtauld Institutes, vol. 4, no. 1/2, 1940, pp. 114–117, JSTOR
