= Saint Jerome in Meditation (Piero di Cosimo) =

Painting by Piero di Cosimo

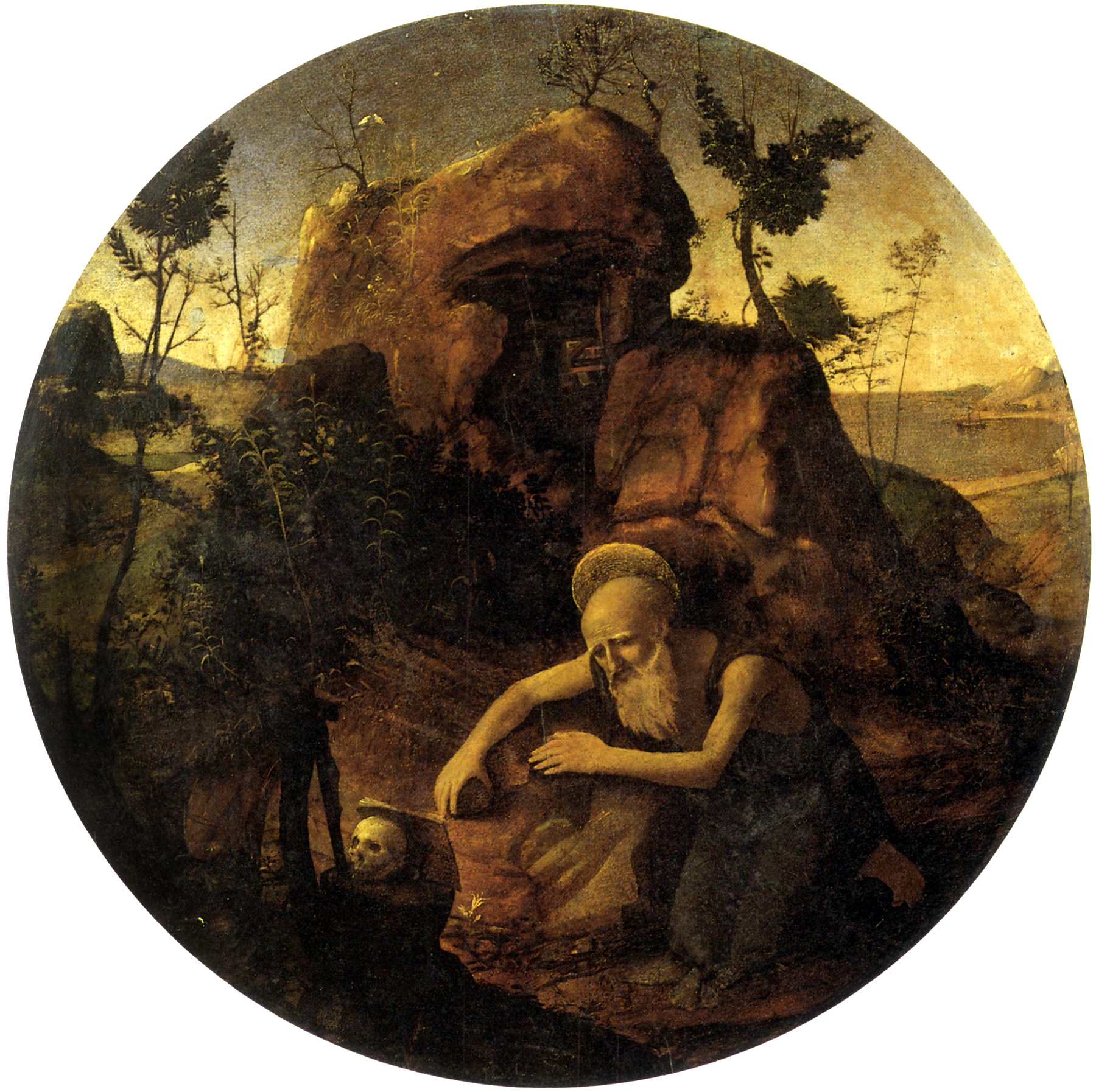
- Year: 1490s (Julian)

Saint Jerome in Meditation is an oil painting on panel by Piero di Cosimo, dating to c. 1495–1500 and now in the Museo Horne in Florence.
