= Carnesecchi Triptych =

Altarpiece by Masolino, Masaccio and others

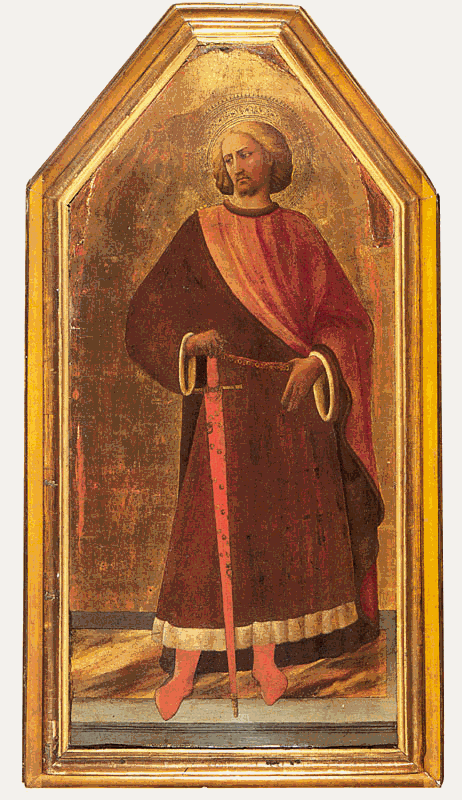
The Saint Julian panel

The Carnesecchi Triptych was an altarpiece of c. 1423–1425 by Masolino, Masaccio and others, depicting the Madonna and Child with Saints Catherine of Alexandria and Julian the Hospitaller. It seems to mark the beginning of Masolino and Masaccio's collaboration.

Dismembered in the 17th century, it is now totally lost except for panel showing Saint Julian (in the diocesan museum of Santo Stefano al Ponte in Florence) and one of the three panels of the predella. That predella panel was long thought to be the painting by Masolino now in the Ingres Museum in Montauban, but recent expert studies by the Opificio delle Pietre Dure have instead identified it as a painting by Masaccio in the Museo Horne in Florence.

== See also ==
- List of major paintings by Masaccio

== Sources ==
- http://www.carnesecchi.eu/Maggiore3.htm
