= Arthur Heygate Mackmurdo =

English architect and designer

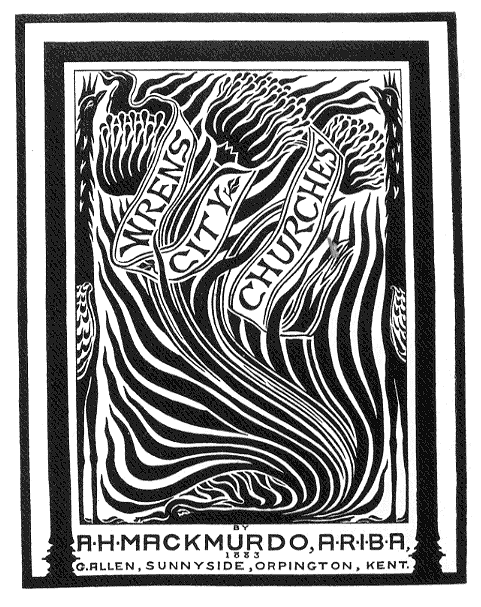
Bookcover of Arthur Mackmurdo, Wren's City Churches, 1883: often cited among incunabula of Art Nouveau

Arthur Heygate Mackmurdo (12 December 1851 – 15 March 1942) was a progressive English architect and designer, who influenced the Arts and Crafts Movement, notably through the Century Guild of Artists, which he set up in partnership with Herbert Horne in 1882. He was the pioneer of the Modern Style (British Art Nouveau style) and in turn global Art Nouveau movement.

== Early life ==
Mackmurdo was the son of a wealthy chemical manufacturer. He was educated at Felsted School, and was first trained under the architect T. Chatfield Clarke, from whom he claimed to have learnt nothing. Then, in 1869, he became an assistant to the Gothic Revival architect James Brooks. In 1873, he visited John Ruskin's School of Drawing, and accompanied Ruskin to Italy in 1874. He stayed on to study in Florence for a while; despite the influence of Ruskin, the Italian architecture he was most impressed by was that of the Renaissance.

== Career ==
In 1874 he opened his own architectural practice at 28 Southampton Street, in central London.

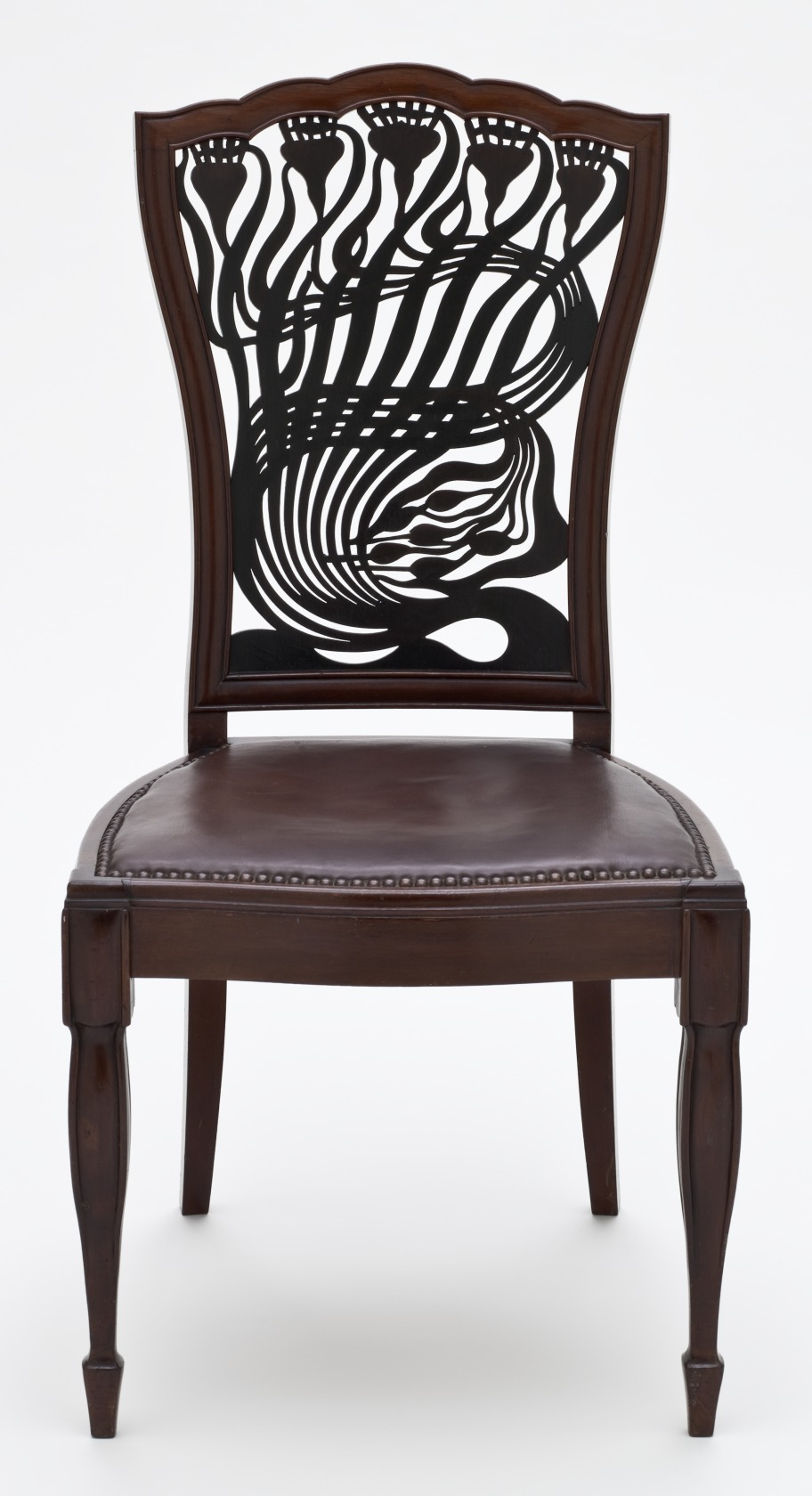
Chair designed by Mackmurdo, the back panel of which has been seen as a precursor of Art Nouveau design.

In 1882, Mackmurdo founded the Century Guild of Artists with his friend and fellow architect Herbert Percy Horne. Others associated with the Guild included most prominently Selwyn Image, but also Clement Heaton, William De Morgan, Heywood Sumner, Christopher Whall, Charles Winstanley, William Kellock Brown, George Esling and John Ruskin's protegee, the sculptor Benjamin Creswick. It was one of the more successful craft guilds of its time. It offered complete furnishing of homes and buildings, and its artists were encouraged to participate in production as well as design; Mackmurdo himself mastered several crafts, including metalworking and cabinet making.

In 1884, the guild showed a display in the form of a music room at the Health Exhibition in London; the stand was shown, with variations, at subsequent exhibitions in Manchester and Liverpool. It incorporated two of Mackmurdo's favourite motifs. One was foliage twisted into sinuous curves. Nikolaus Pevsner described Mackmurdo's use of such foliage on the title page of the designer's own Wren's City Churches (1883) as "the first work of art nouveau which can be traced", identifying its main influences as Rossetti and Burne-Jones, and ultimately, through them, William Blake.

The second motif was the use of thin square columns, topped with flat squares instead of capitals. These columns influenced the furniture designs of C.F.A. Voysey, and, through him, Charles Rennie Mackintosh. Mackmurdo used them architecturally on his own house at 8 Private Road, Enfield (1887), and on a house for the artist Mortimer Menpes, at 25 Cadogan Gardens, Chelsea (1893–94), where he incorporated them into a kind of Queen Anne style.

Mackmurdo designed the cover for his friend, indexer Nancy Bailey's Index to The Times ran from 1899 to 1901.

Mackmurdo made a major donation to the William Morris Gallery in Walthamstow, which is an important repository of the work of the Century Guild.

== List of buildings ==
- 6 (Halcyon) (1874–6, now demolished) and 8 (Brooklyn) (1883) Private Road, Enfield
- 16 Redington Road, Hampstead (1889)
- 12 Hans Road, Chelsea (1894)
- 25 Cadogan Gardens, Chelsea (1893–4)
- 109–13, Charterhouse Street (1900)
- Great Ruffins, Great Totham (1904)
- Beacons, Wickham Bishops (1902)
- Beacons Lodge, Wickham Bishops (c.1920)
- Sandhills Cottage, Formby (1882)
- Village Hall, Great Totham (1929-1930)
