= Deucalion and Pyrrha (Beccafumi) =

Painting by Domenico Beccafumi

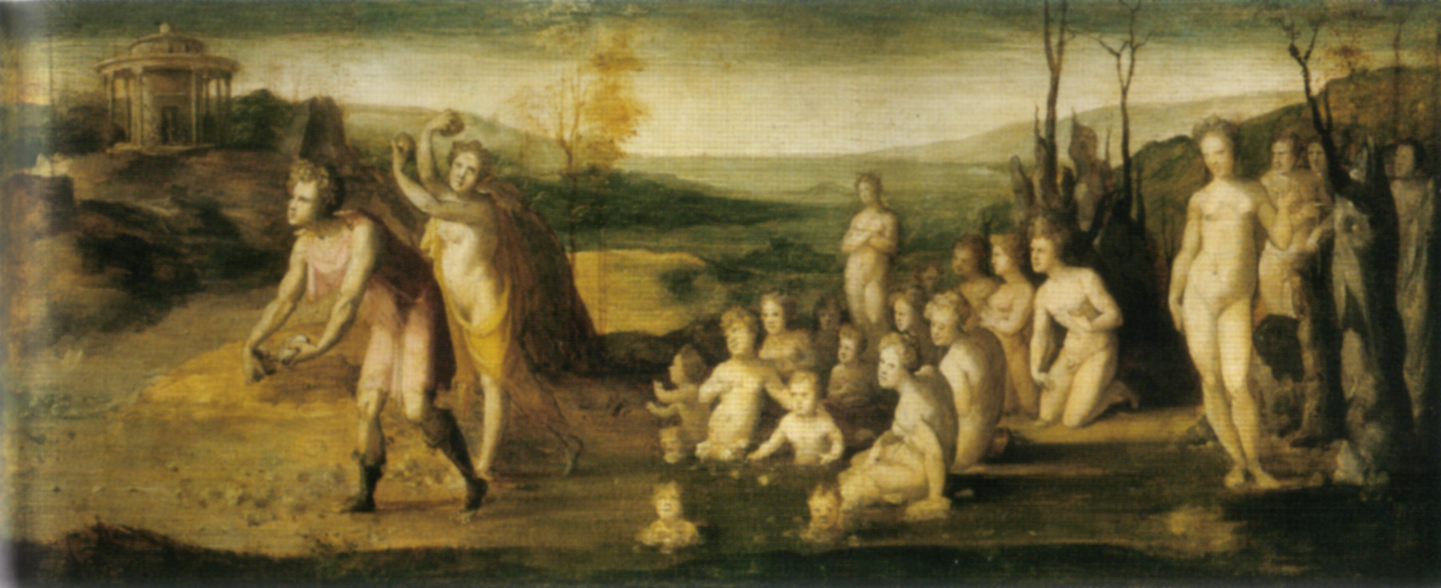
Deucalion and Pyrrha (c. 1520–1525) by Domenico Beccafumi

Deucalion and Pyhrra is an oil painting on panel of c. 1520–1525 by the Italian Renaissance painter Domenico Beccafumi. It is held now in the Museo Horne, in Florence.

== History and description ==
The work, of unknown English provenance, is part of a series of panels for chests and espaliers that Beccafumi had to paint during his career.

The subject, taken from Ovid's Metamorphoses, is linked to the legend of Deucalion and Pyrrha which symbolizes the couple's role in the foundation of a new lineage: a theme particularly suitable for a chest or in any case for a wedding decoration.

Attributed to the Sienese master in 1920, since then it has always been in the artist's catalogue, juxtaposing it with other similar scenes, such as Hercules at the Crossroads in the Bardini Museum, and the Rape of Europa, in the Guarini del Taja collection in Siena.

The two spouses are represented on the left while, as indicated to them, they are throwing stones at each other's backs from which new individuals are reborn after the extermination of the flood. The rapid and nuanced strokes and the narrative vivacity are influenced by the Raphaelesque examples of the Vatican Loggia or the Frieze room of Villa Farnesina. The setting is an open countryside represented in warm tones and with the fading of the aerial perspective. On the left, a circular temple recalls the Roman classicist style.

== Sources ==
- "Polo Museale Fiorentino – Catalogo delle opere". polomuseale.firenze.it.
