= Naddo Ceccarelli =

Italian painter

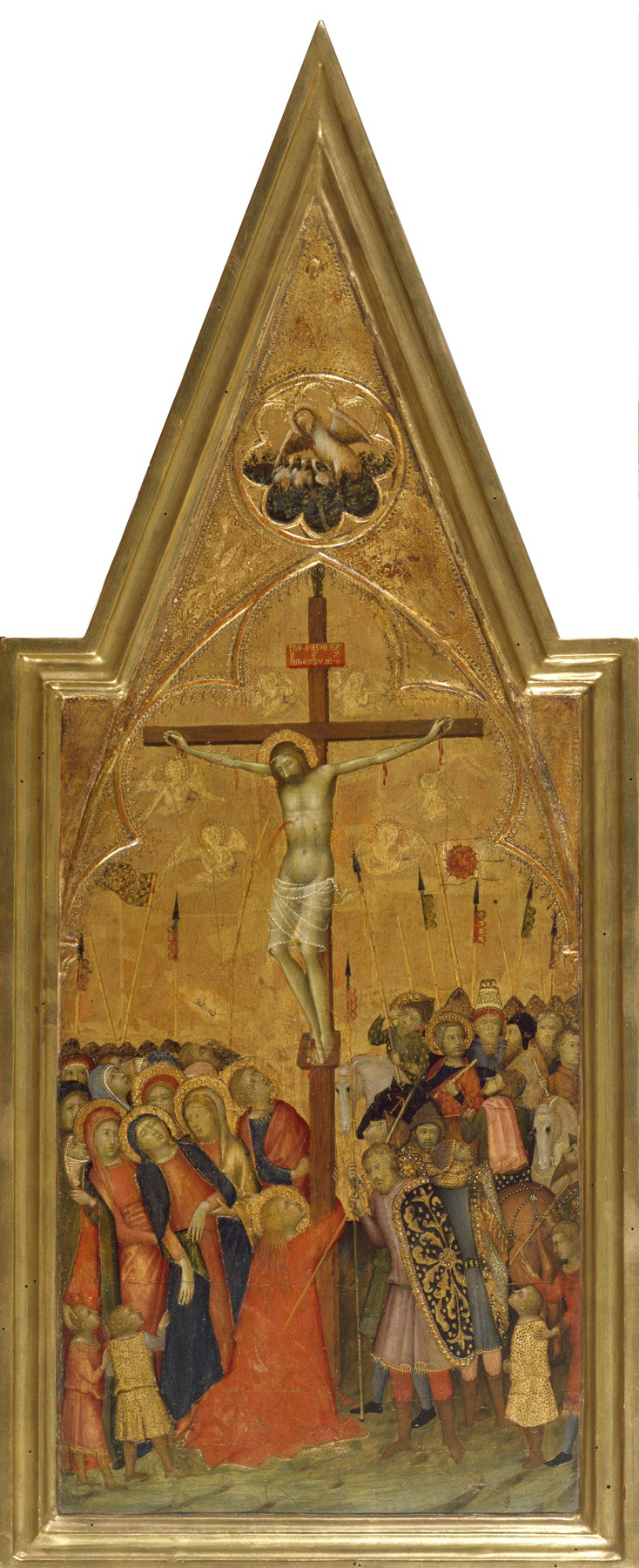
The Crucifixion, The Walters Art Museum

Naddo Ceccarelli (documented 1347, active c. 1330–60) was a 14th-century Italian painter of the Sienese School.

== Work ==
Naddo Ceccarelli was a gifted pupil of the leading Sienese painter Simone Martini (ca. 1284–1344). He may have travelled with Martini to Avignon in 1330 and returned to Siena after Martini's death in 1345. He became one of the better-known artists of the master's workshop after Martini's death.

Two signed paintings by Ceccarelli's hand are known, and they form the basis around which his oeuvre has been grouped. They are the Madonna and Child (formerly in the Cook Collection in Richmond, Surrey, United Kingdom) dated to 1347 and a Man of Sorrows (Liechtenstein Collection, Vaduz). The majority of the works attributed to Ceccarelli are depictions of the Madonna and Child and are typically small-scale. An exception is the Madonna and Child with Saints (Pinacoteca Nazionale (Siena)), which is of a larger scale and probably painted as an altarpiece. Ceccarelli's work is closer to that of the Master of the Palazzo Venezia Madonna and the Master of the Strauss Madonna (sometimes identified with Frederico Memmi and Donato Martini, respectively) than with Martini himself.

Ceccarelli was one of a handful of Sienese painters who created reliquaries that emulated the work produced by goldsmiths. Where before reliquaries had been the special domain of the goldsmith, by the fourteenth century, the development of gold-ground painting in Italy led to the development of new forms of sacred container. Sacred relics became incorporated into panel paintings, which predominantly featured Marian imagery. The producers of these objects combined the display functions of reliquaries with the devotional imagery associated with sculpture and painting.

Ceccarelli was particularly skilled in suggesting the shine of metalwork through his use of tempera. He carefully layered his paint over the gold ground, which he enriched with a variety of tooled and incised designs. Ceccarelli was apt at capturing the gleam of chain mail and the arabesques of damask. In his work, he pays attention to render precious with great care. In The Crucifixion in the Walters Art Museum, for instance, the shield of the centurion at the right is decorated with a deep blue pattern laid on a tooled gold ground, giving it the basse-taille enamel.

== Gallery ==
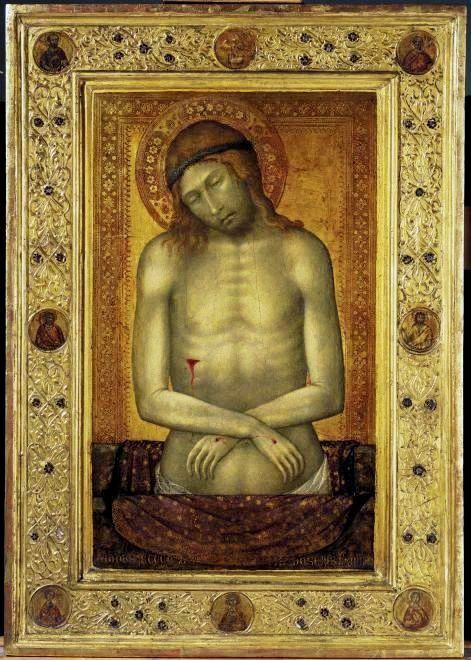
Christ as the Man of Sorrows, c. 1347,
Liechtenstein Collection

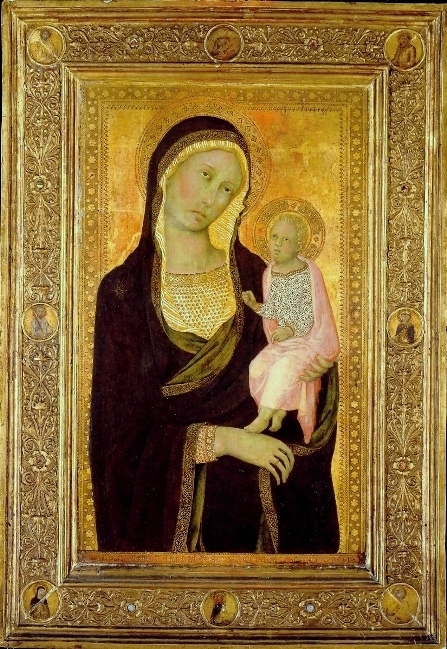
Madonna and Child, 1347

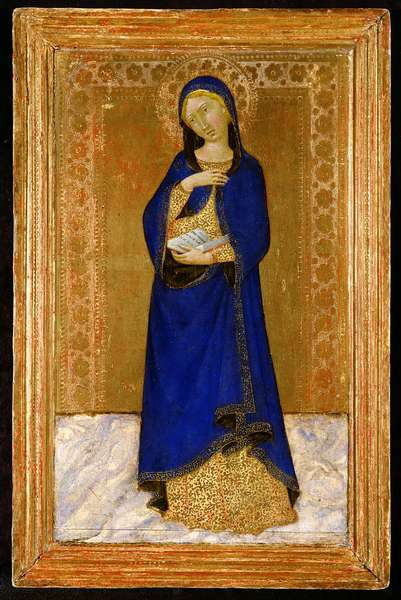
The Virgin Annunciate
Noortman Collection

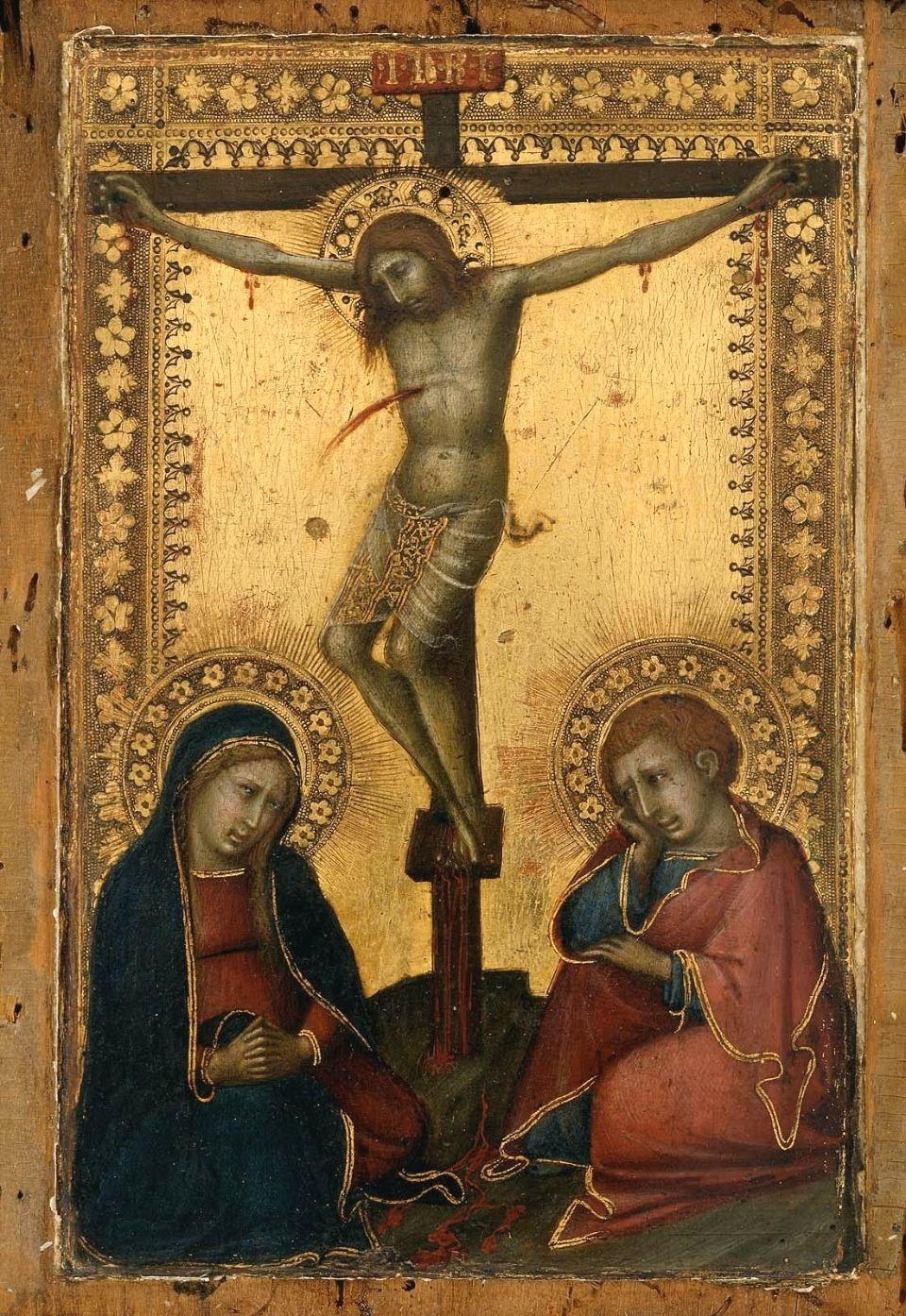
Crucified Christ with the Virgin and Saint John the Evangelist
Boston Museum of Fine Arts
