= Deucalion and Pyrrha (Rubens) =

Painting by Peter Paul Rubens

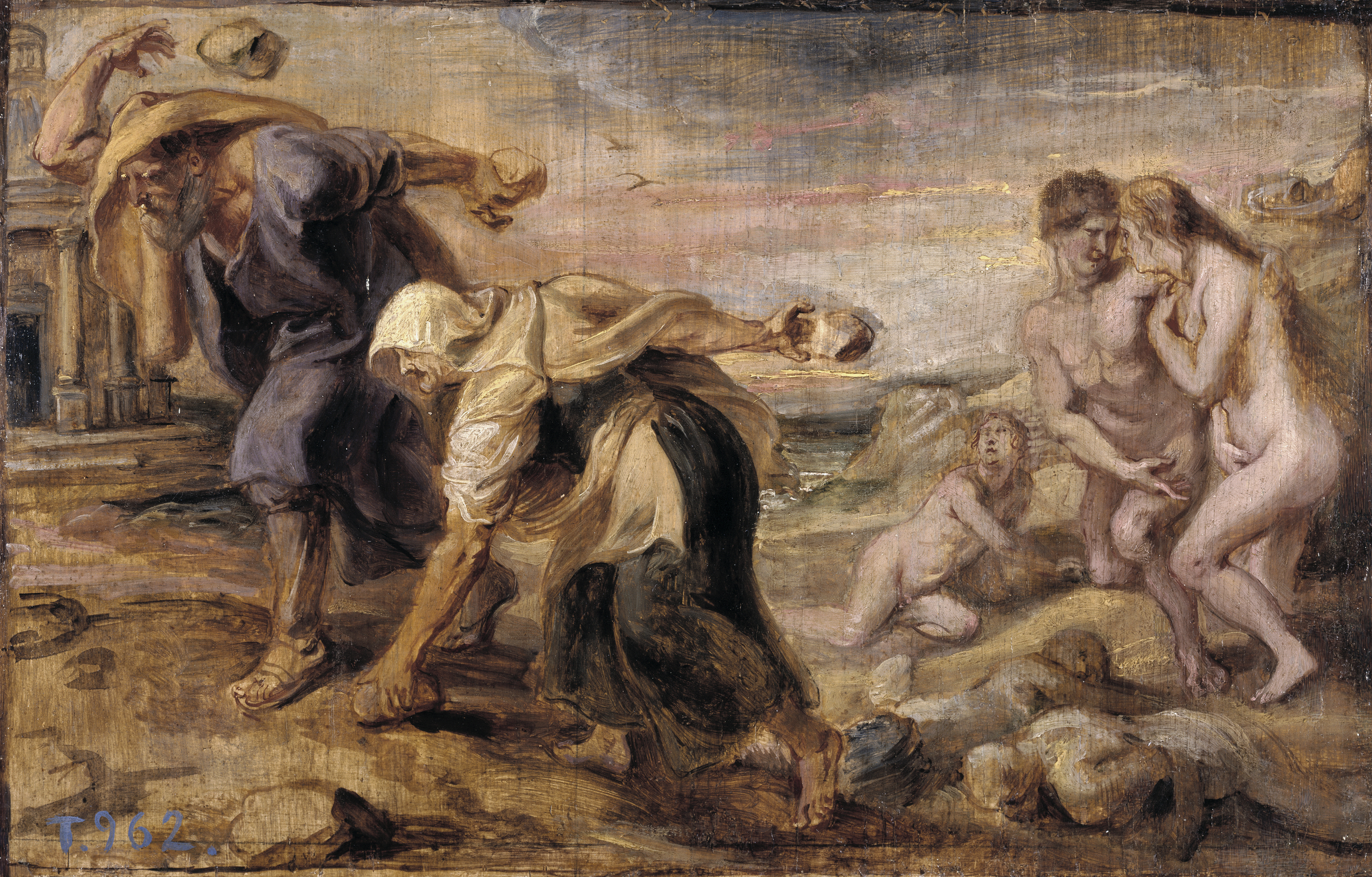
- Artist: Peter Paul Rubens
- Year: 1636–1637
- Medium: Oil paint, panel
- Dimensions: 26.4 cm (10.4 in) × 41.7 cm (16.4 in)
- Location: Museo del Prado
- Accession: P002041

Deucalion and Pyrrha is a 1636–1637 oil sketch by Peter Paul Rubens, now in the Museo del Prado. It is a sketch for a lost painting by Jan Cossiers - that painting was commissioned for the Torre de la Parada.
