= Herbert Horne =

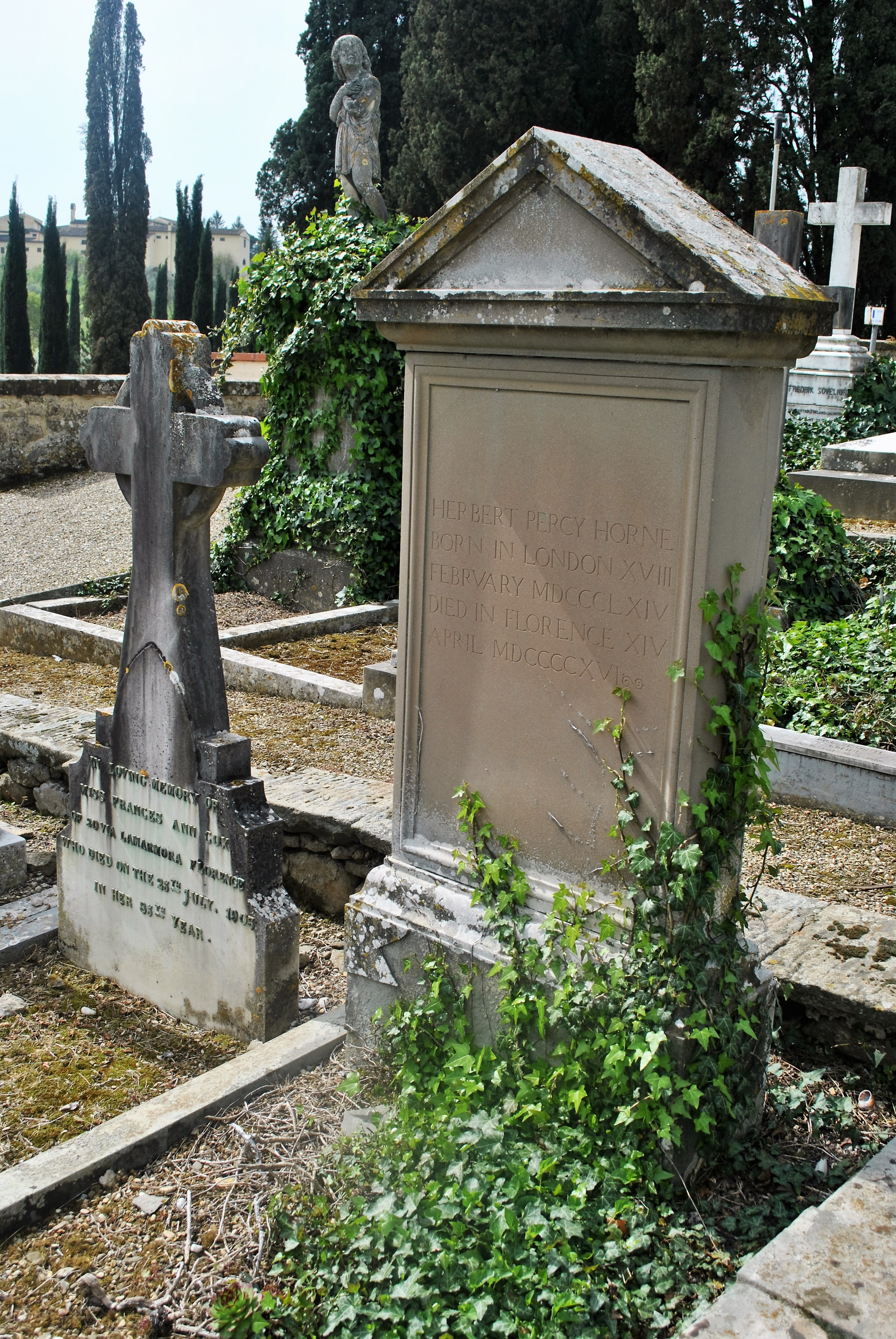
- Cimitero degli Allori, Herbert Percy Horne
- Born: Herbert Percy Horne; 1864; London
- Died: 1916 (aged 51–52); Florence, Italy
- Occupations: Poet; architect; typographer and designer; art historian; antiquarian

Herbert Percy Horne (1864 in London – 1916 in Florence, Italy) was an English poet, architect, typographer and designer, art historian and antiquarian. He was an associate of the Rhymers' Club in London. He edited the magazines The Century Guild Hobby Horse and The Hobby Horse for the Century Guild of Artists, which he founded with fellow architect Arthur Heygate Mackmurdo in 1882.

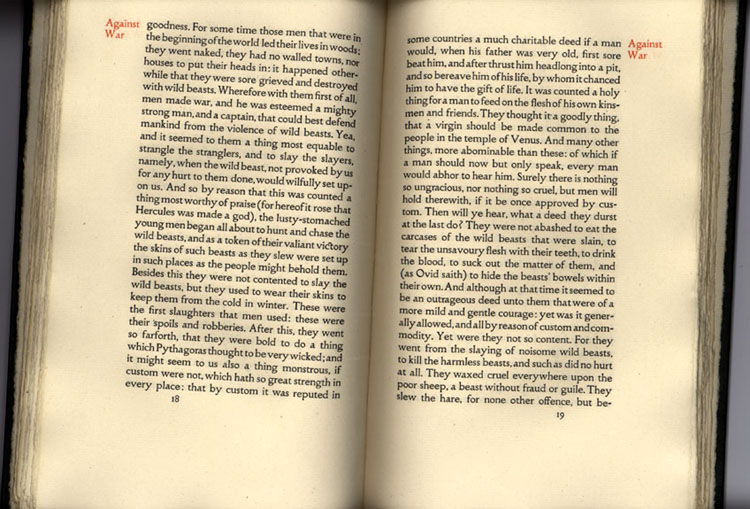
Representative book design by Herbert Horne. (Against War by Erasmus, Merrymount Press, printed 1908).

Horne was closely associated with Arthur Symons and Selwyn Image and their mistress Muriel (Edith) Broadbent. Later in life he settled in Florence, restoring a Renaissance palazzo into which he eventually moved. He first visited Italy in 1889 and kept an illustrated journal of his travels and art and architectural research. His monograph on Sandro Botticelli from 1908 is still recognised as of exceptional quality and thoroughness.

== Death and commemoration ==
He donated his collection, of arts and handicrafts of the 14th and 15th centuries, to create the Museo della Fondazione Horne in Florence, where he died.

He is buried in the Cimitero Evangelico degli Allori in the southern suburb of Florence, Galluzzo (Italy).

Horne founded the Riccardi Press, a leading British private press that beginning in 1909 issued titles for the Medici Society and later under its own imprint.

== Selected publications ==
- Diversi Colores (poems). 1891.
- The Binding of Books. An Essay in the History of Gold-Tooled Bindings. London 1894
- Giovanni dal Ponte. 1906.
- Alessandro Filipepi, commonly called Sandro Botticelli, painter of Florence. 1908; reprint: Princeton University Press 1981, ISBN 978-0691039497
