= Santissima Annunziata, Pistoia =

Church building in Pistoia, Italy

Coordinates: 43.93211°N 10.92198°E

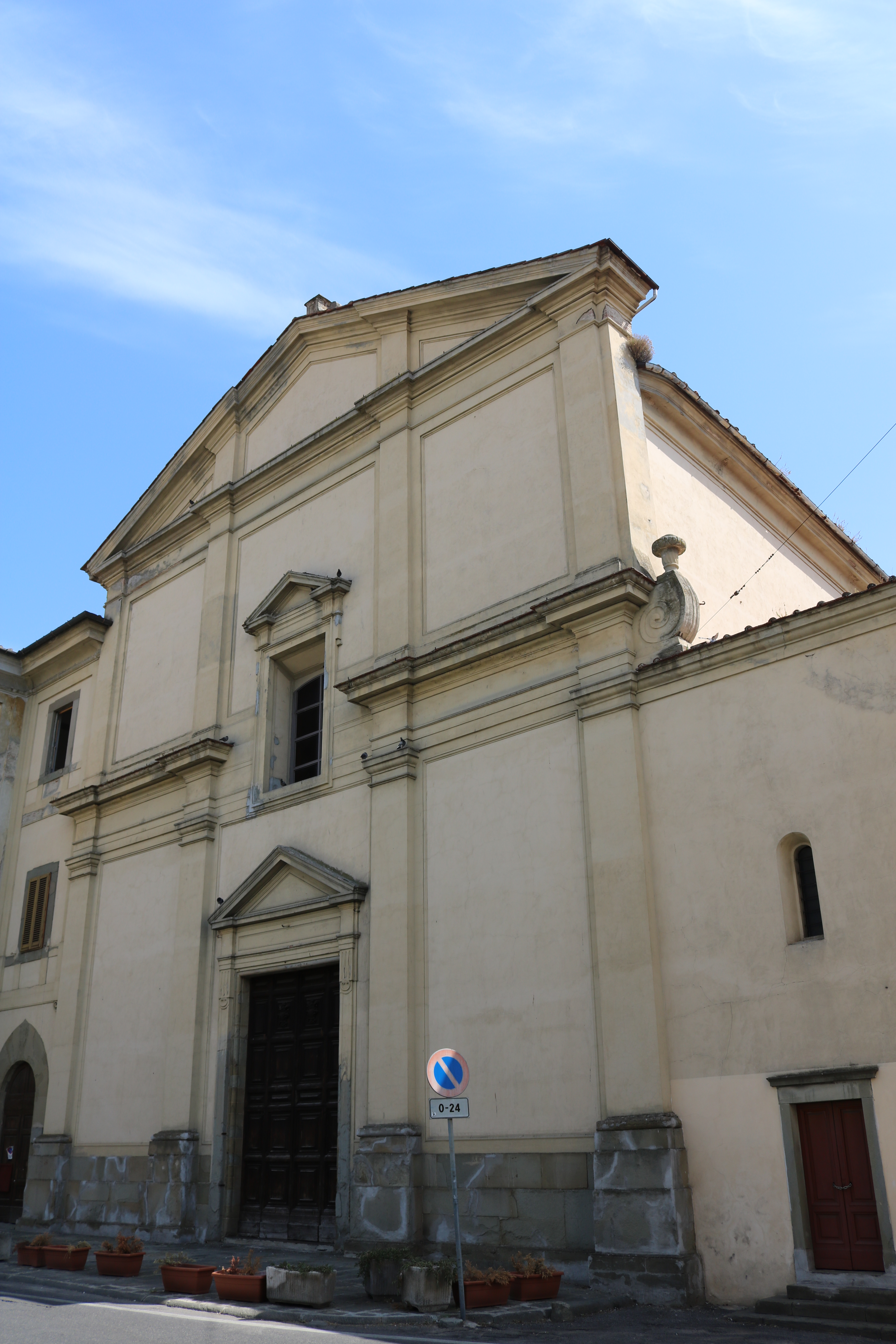
Facade of Church

The church and convent of the Santissima Annunziata (Most Holy Virgin of the Annunciation) is a Baroque-style, Roman Catholic church located on Piazza de Servi #4, Pistoia, region of Tuscany, Italy. The convent presently functions as a warehouse. The church is down via Laudesi from the San Desiderio, and via Piazza de Servi, From San Giovanni Decollato.

== History ==
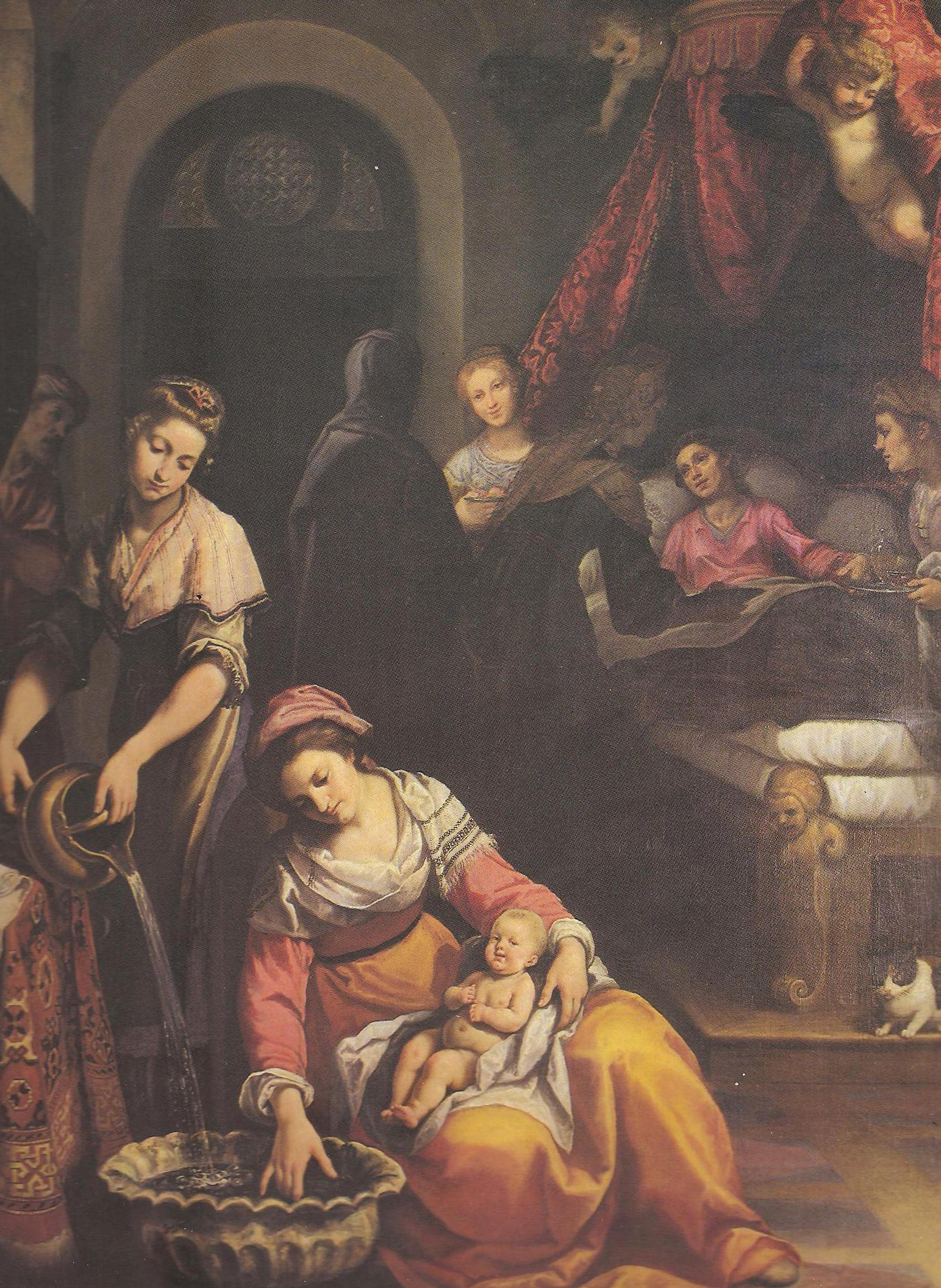
Nativity of Mary by Ludovico Cardi, known as il Cigoli

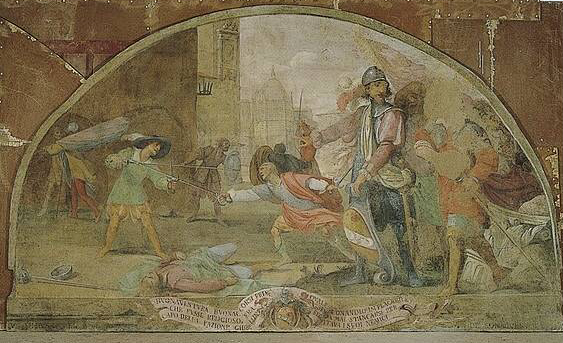
Choir lunette depicting Bonaventura Bonaccorsi by Cecco Bravo.

Priests of the Servite order arrived to Pistoia by 1241, and moved here to a house with a small oratory titled Santa Maria Novelleta and located just outside the gates of the Porta San Piero. By 1270-1271 construction of a convent and church had begun. Initially, the Servites were affiliated with San Pietro Maggiore in town, but by 1296, a new larger church at the site was underway, not completed until 1393. The original consecration to Santa Maria de’ Servi was altered in 1537 to the Santissima Annunziata. In the 17th century, the church was refurbished and decorated with Baroque frescoes and stucco. In 1786, the convent was suppressed by the Bishop Ricci, but recruited again as a monastery by 1794. In 1810, the Napoleonic forces again suppressed the convent. The church was made into a parish until 1856, when the Servites briefly returned, only to be again suppressed in Pistoia this time by the Italian kingdom, turning the convent into barracks. The cloister retains 17th-century frescoes depicting the history of the Servite order.

== Description ==
The organ present in 1853 was made by Filippo Tronci. An inventory in 1853 listed the church as containing the following works:

- Virgin of the Annunciation (1590) by Bastiano Veronese for the altar of the Peraccini Family
- Visitation by Giuseppe Giusti for the altar of the Gori Family
- Madonna dei Dolori by Pietro Cremoncini with Angels holding instruments of Passion by Pietro Dandini for the altar of the Puccini Family
- Presentation at the Temple (1577) also by Bastiano Veronese for the altar of the Baldinotti Family
- Enthroned Madonna and Saints John, Bartholemew, and others attributed to Leonardo Malatesta for main altarpiece
- Nativity of Mary by Cigoli for altar of the Baldinotti family
- Virgin of the Annunciation by Pier Dandini for a second altar of the Peraccini Family
- San Pellegrino by Gigli for the Altar of the Convent
- Immaculate Conception by Tommaso Redi for the altar of the convent
- Frescoes in superior register with Blessed Servites by Niccolò Nannetti, those in the choir by Giovanni Ferretti.

In the cloister, the six frescoed lunettes (1601-1602) before the sacristy we painted by Bernardino Poccetti; the six frescoed lunettes (1637) before the refectory we painted by Francesco Montelatici (Cecco Bravo); while above windows are frescoes by Filippo Cremoncini. Other frescoes in the convent were completed by Alessio Gimignani, Giovanni Martinelli, Giovanni Domenico Pestrini father and son.
