= Pieve di Santa Maria Assunta, Popiglio =

Church building in Popiglio, Italy

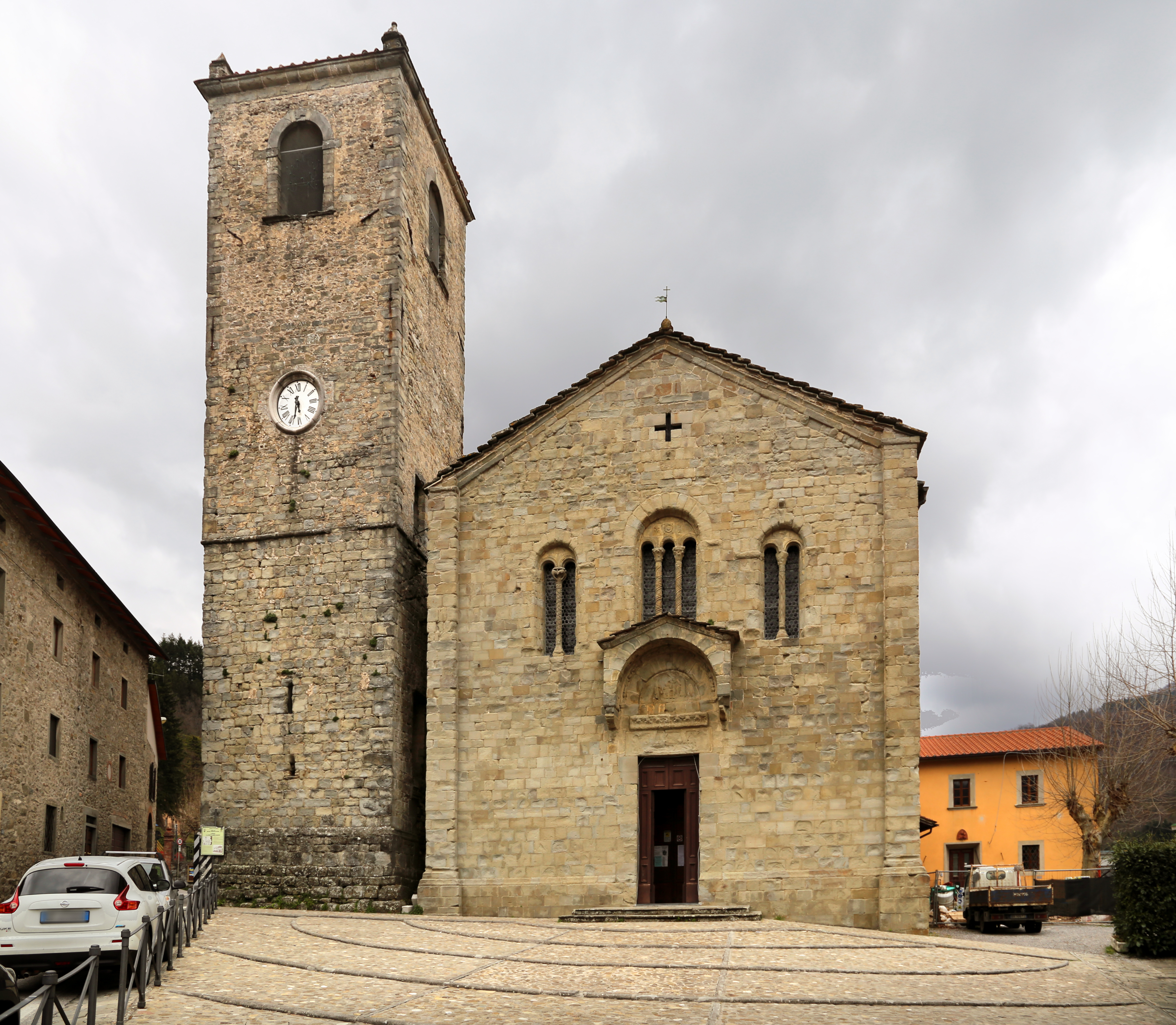
Pieve di Santa Maria Assunta, Popiglio

The Pieve di Santa Maria Assunta is a Romanesque-style, Roman Catholic rural parish church in the hamlet of Popiglio, in the town limits of San Marcello Pistoiese, province of Pistoia, region of Tuscany, Italy. The sacristy of the church and the adjacent Oratory of the Compagnia del Corpus Domini (Confraternity of the Body of God (Christ) presently house the Diocesan museum, containing both artifacts and artworks from the region.

Documents from 1074 cite a church at this town titled S. Mariae et S. Iohannis Baptiste sito Pupillio and a papal bull by Innocent II from 1133 also mentions such a church, in the Cafaggio neighborhood of the town. By 1271, this church was completed.

Among the artworks were some 16th and 17th century donations from the Vannini family. It has a last supper painted by Sebastiano Vini. A 17th-century organ now on display in the museum was constructed by Giuseppe Testa.
