= Chiesa del Tau, Pistoia =

Church building in Pistoia, Italy

Coordinates: 43.930956°N 10.916295°E

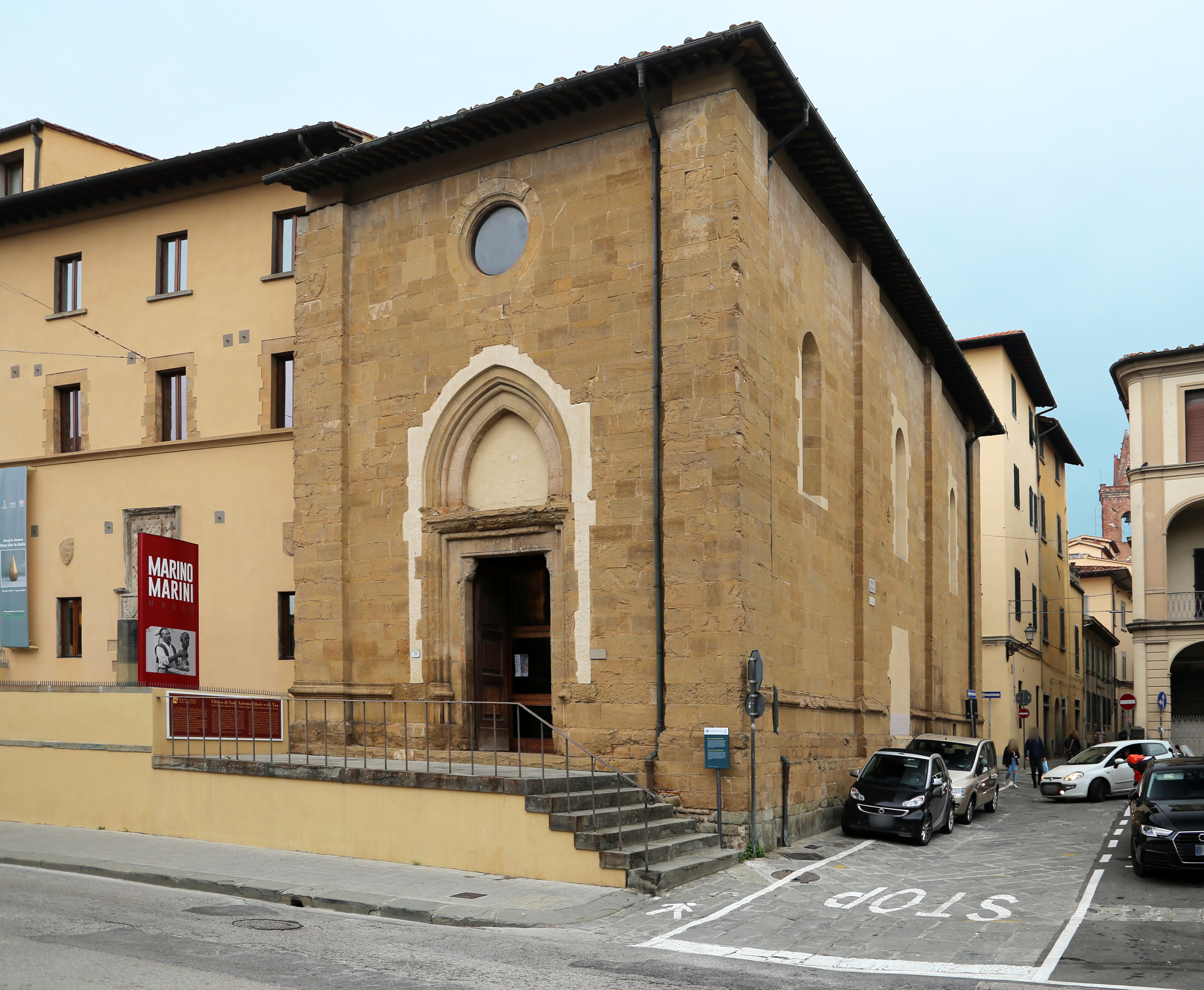
Facade of church along Piazza Garibaldi

The Church of Tau is a 14th-century, deconsecrated Roman Catholic church located on Corso Silvano Fedi #28 in Pistoia, region of Tuscany, Italy. It is located adjacent to Piazza Garibaldi, and across the street from the church of San Domenico.

It was originally dedicated to St Anthony Abbot, and established along with the monastery by monks of the Canons Regular of St Anthony of Vienne. The church and adjacent monastery now houses the Fondazione Marino Marini, and exhibits some of the 20th-century sculptor's work in the church. The walls of the church were frescoed in 1372 by Niccolò di Tommaso and Antonio Vite.

== Gallery ==
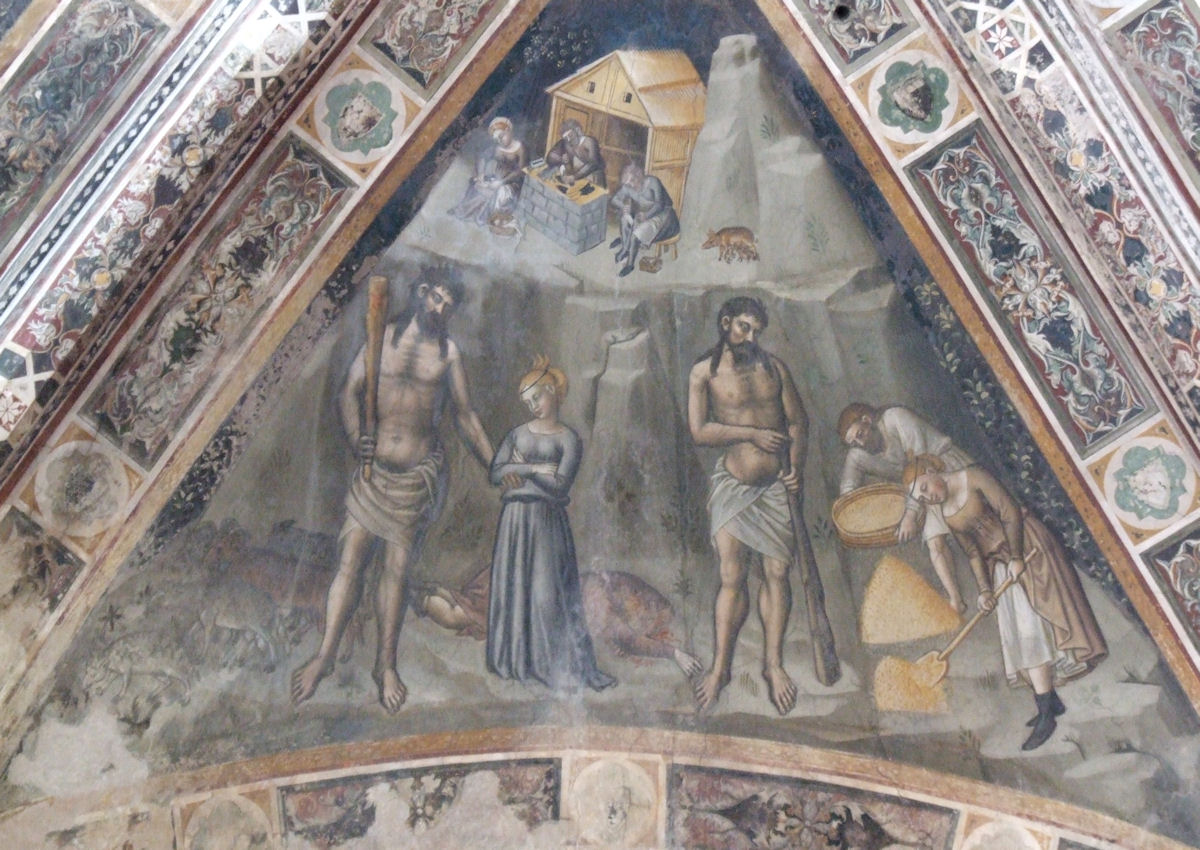
Detail of frescoes

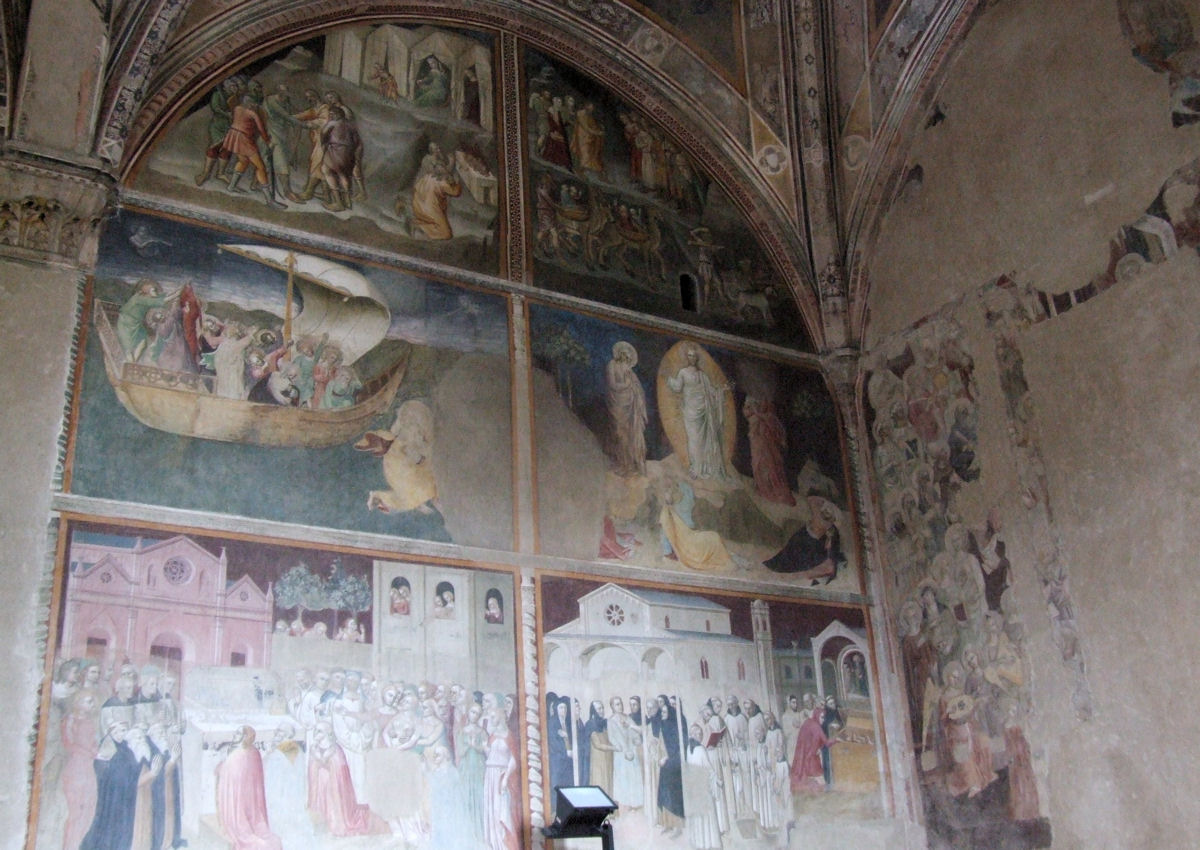
Detail of frescoes

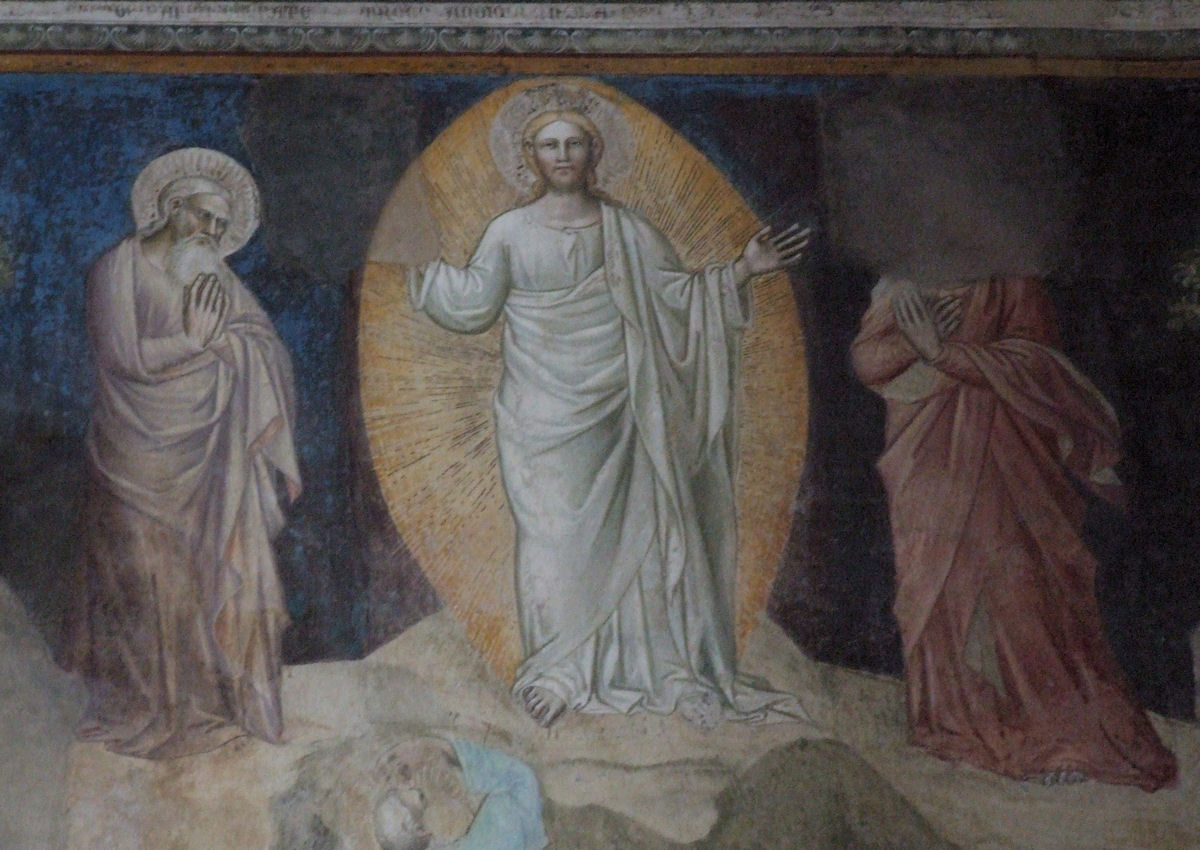
Transfiguration

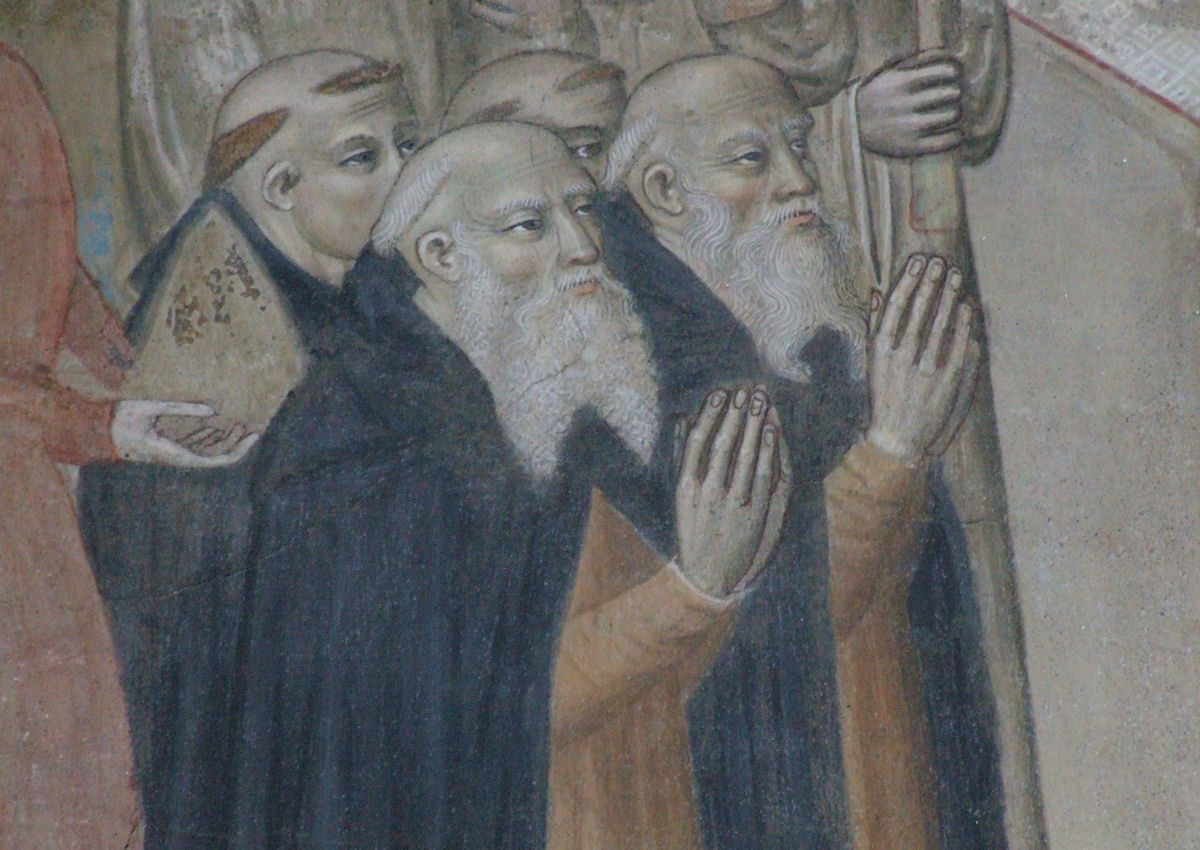
Friars in prayer

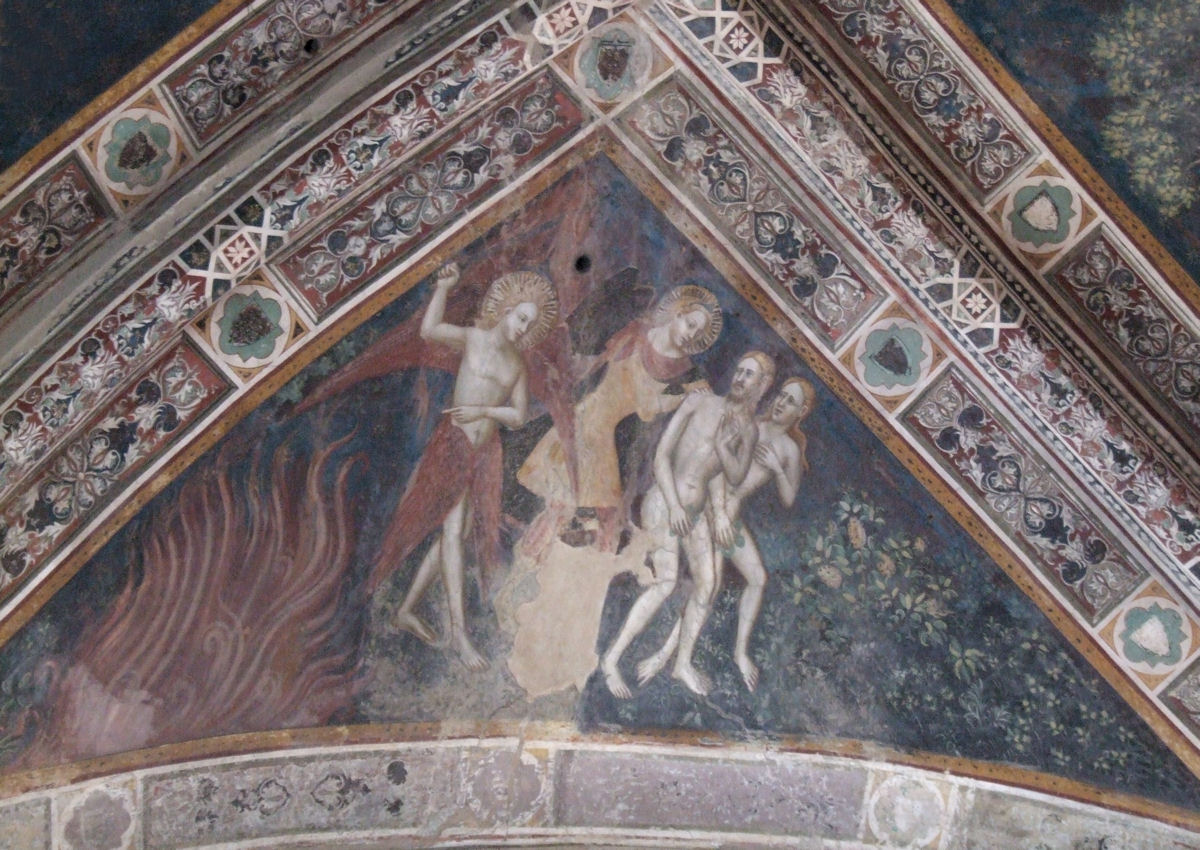
Expulsion from Paradise

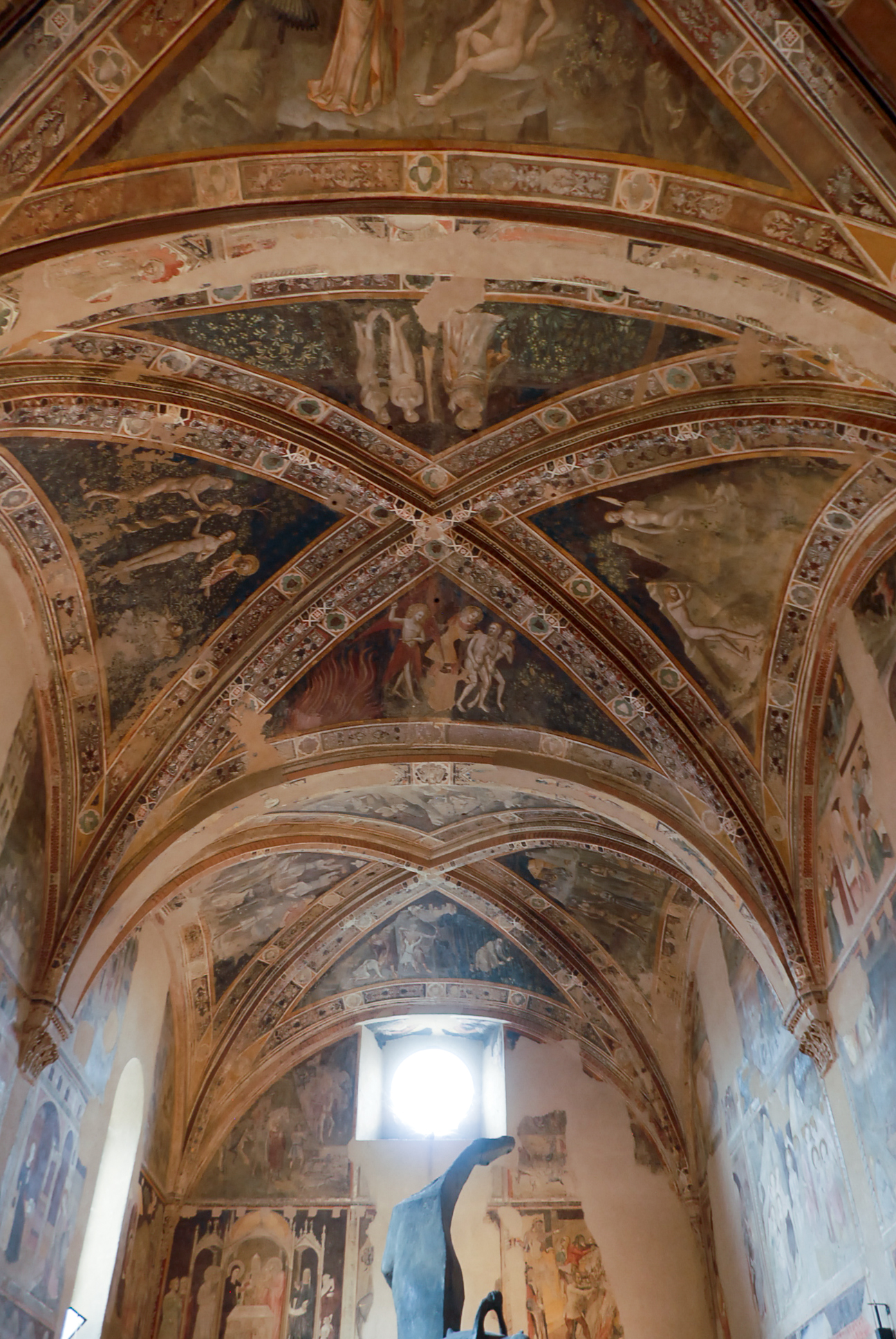
Marini sculptures exhibited in church

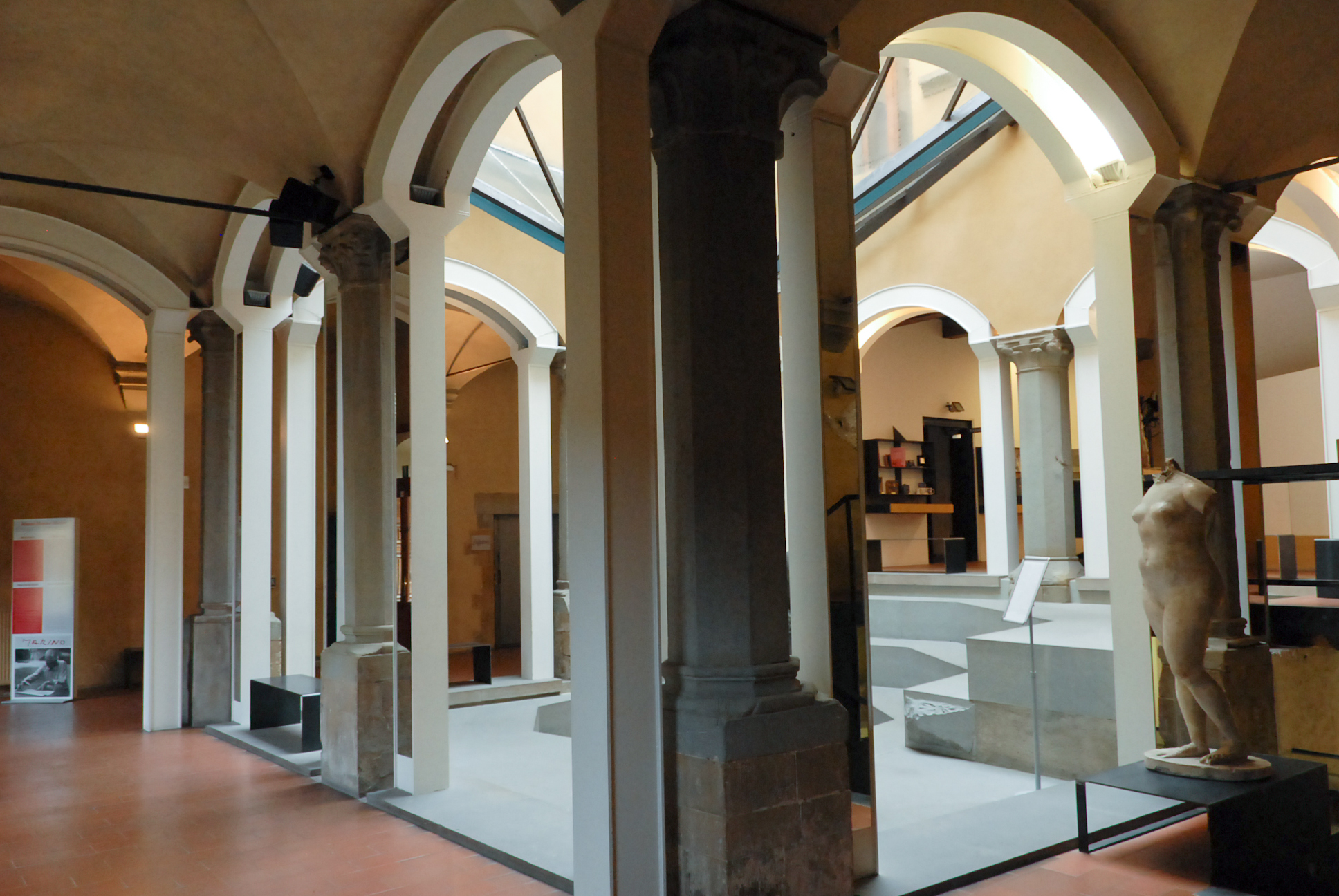
Cloister of Museum

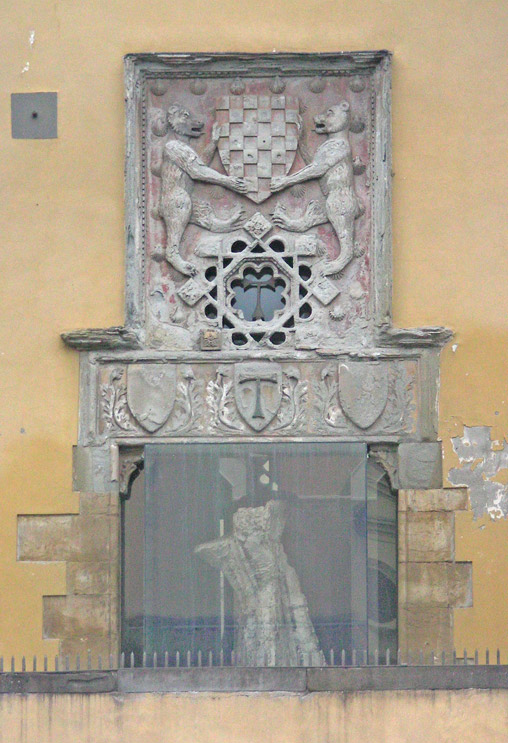
Entrance to Monastery with bears holding symbol of Pistoia and Tau symbol on lintel
