= Fra Paolino =

Fra Paolino may refer to:

- Paolino Veneto (c. 1272–1344), Italian Franciscan historian and bishop
- Fra Paolino da Pistoia (1490–1547), Italian Dominican painter
