= Monument to Garibaldi, Pistoia =

Statue of Giuseppe Garibaldi located in Tuscany, Italy

Monument to Garibaldi
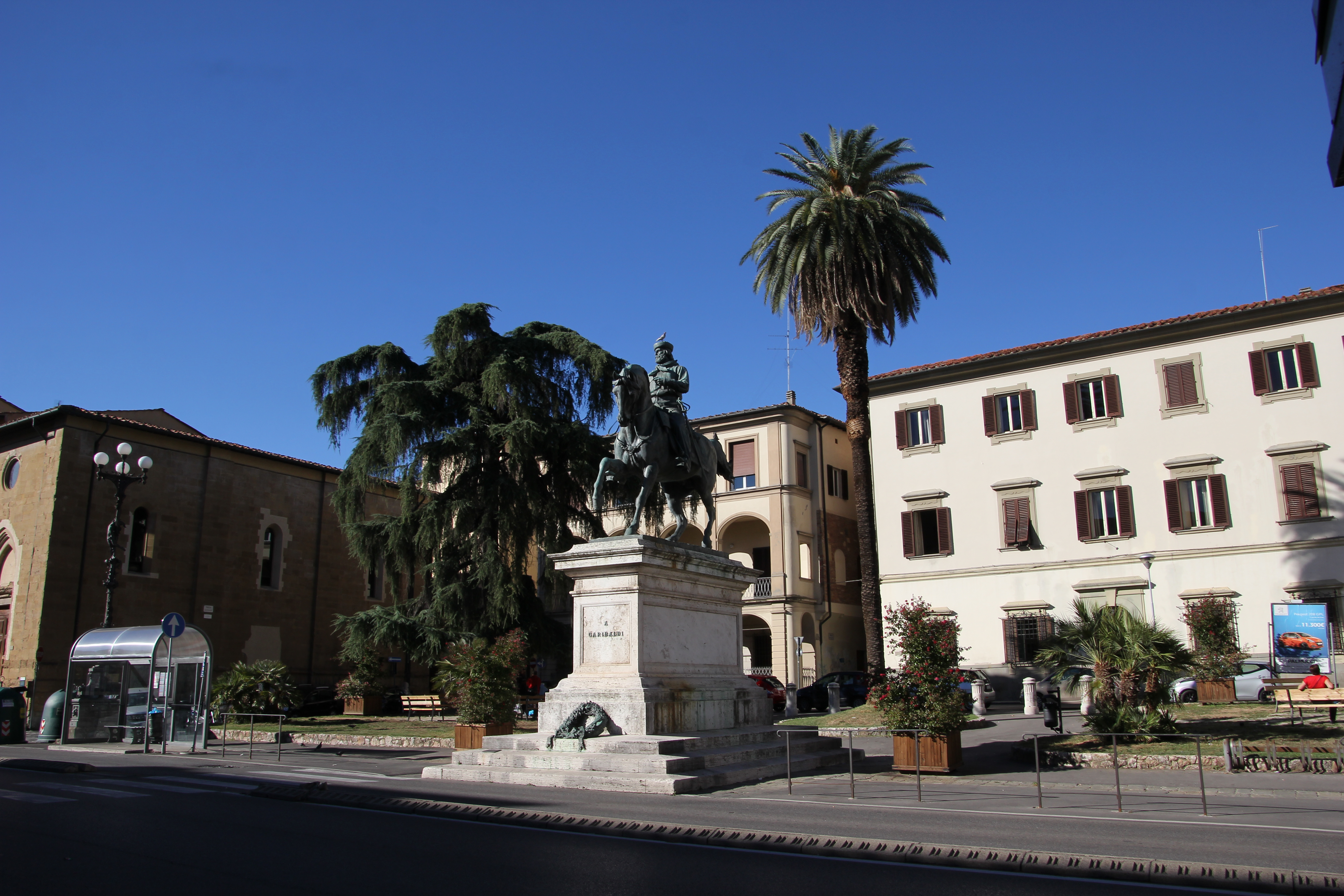
- Monument to Garibaldi with Church of Tau to the left in background.
- Location: Pistoia
- Coordinates: 43.930856°N 10.916713°E
- Designer: Alessandro Garella
- Type: Equestrian Statue
- Material: Bronze
- Dedicated to: Giuseppe Garibaldi

The Monument to Garibaldi is a bronze equestrian statue of Giuseppe Garibaldi, the hero of Italian independence atop a pedestal in the homonymous piazza on Corso Silvani Fedi, in Pistoia, region of Tuscany, Italy.

Initially the monument, designed by Alessandro Garella, was place in Piazza San Domenico, but moved to this piazza in 1904. In 1909, the wreath at the base was added, which contains a depiction of fasces. Garibaldi's horse prances in an active pose, while Garibaldi in cap, remains unperturbed. The initial plans in 1882 for a monument envisioned a simple bust of the patriot, but others envisioned a more dramatic monument, this set up a debate that lasted decades. A final design was not selected till the end of the 19th-century. The next debate was where to site the statue, with the Catholic lobbies opposing placement of the statue of the anticlerical Garibaldi in the central Piazza del Duomo. The Chiesa del Tau faces the small Piazza Garibaldi.
