= Bernardino del Signoraccio =

Italian painter

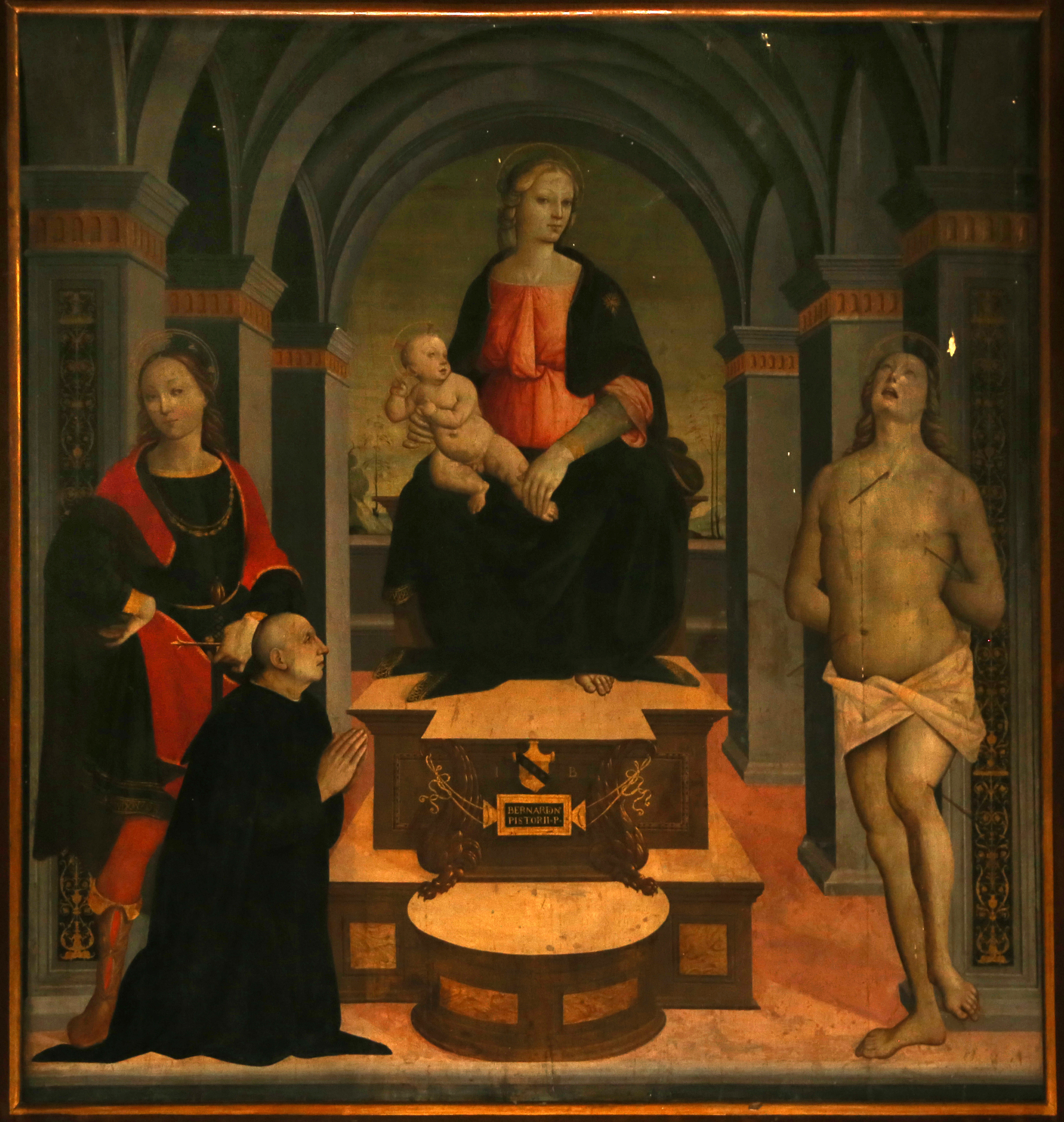
Holy Conversation

Bernardino del Signoraccio or Signoracci (active first three decades of 16th century) was an Italian painter of the Renaissance period, active in Tuscany.

== Biography ==
He was the father of the painter Fra Paolino da Pistoia. Bernardino painted in the manner of Ghirlandaio. Bernardino was the initial trainer of his son.
