= Michelangelo Cinganelli =

Italian painter

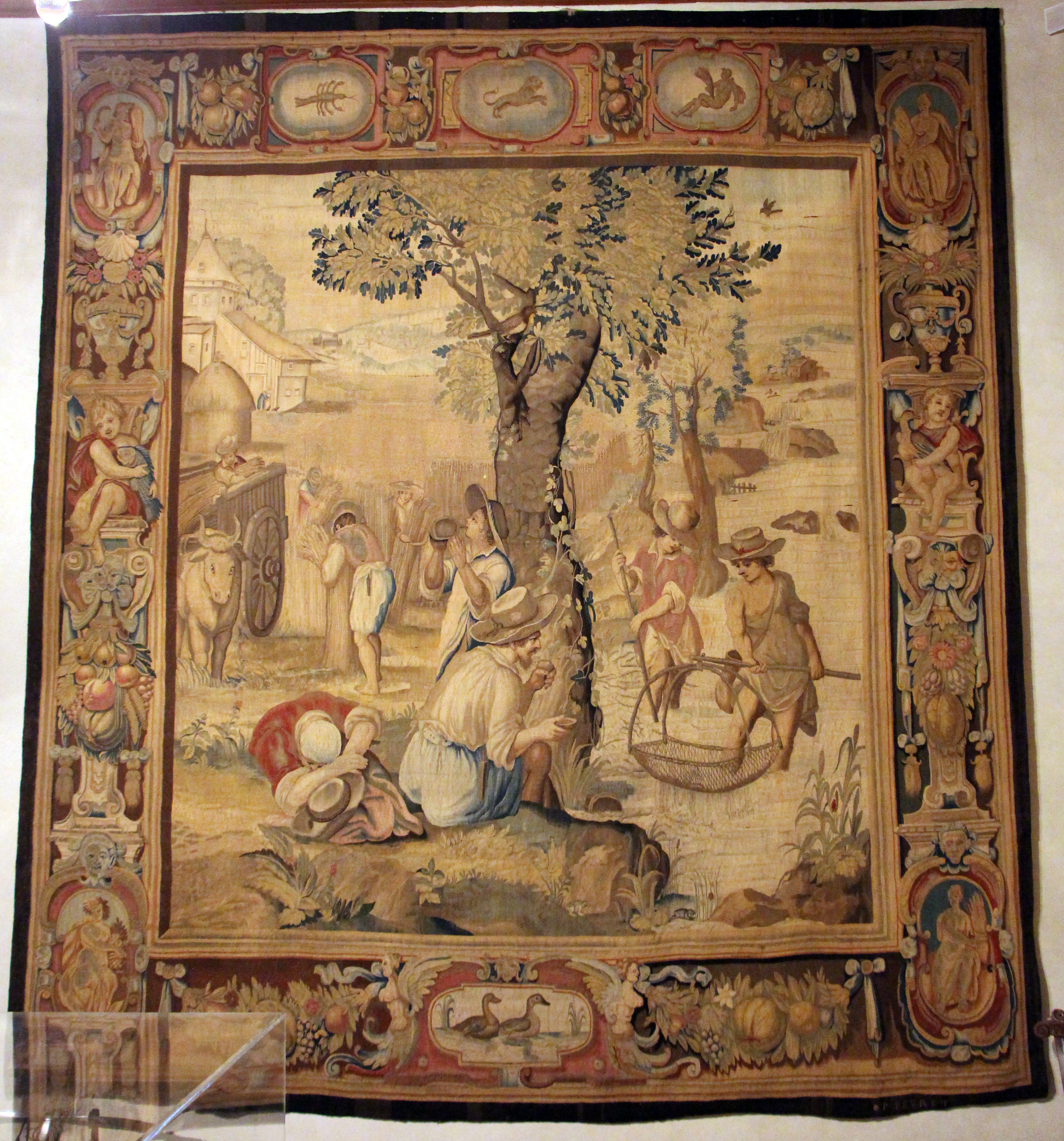
Summer tapissery, realized with a cartoon by Stradanus and Cinganelli

Michelangelo Cinganelli, also known as Michele Cinganelli (Florence, circa 1558 - Florence, September 26, 1635) was an Italian painter.

== Biography ==
He was a pupil or strongly influenced by Bernardino Poccetti of Florence. Along with Orazio Riminaldi, he painted the four Evangelists and angels (1597) in the cupola of the Cathedral of Pisa; a Birth of the Virgin and Annunciation (1598) in the choir; and decoration of the organ in 1602. He also painted in the church of San Domenico, Pistoia. He is documented as working for the tapestry shop of the Medici in Florence. Cinganelli supervised the designs by Ludovico Cigoli for the principal chapel in the church of Santa Felicita in Florence, and frescoed the chapel in 1620.

His family included the artists: Camillo (painter and wood-gilder), Benedetto (son of Michelangelo), and Antonio (son of Camillo).
