= San Paolo, Pistoia =

Roman Catholic church in Tuscany, Italy

Coordinates: 43°55′50.21″N 10°55′7″E

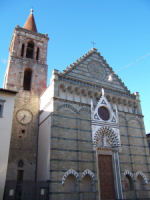
San Paolo in Pistoia

San Paolo is a Roman Catholic church located on Via della Rosa #39 in Pistoia, region of Tuscany, Italy. The eclectic church facade sits near the intersection of four streets: Corso Silvani Fedi, Corso Giovanni Amendola, Via Porta Carratica, and Via del Can Bianco, about a block away along Silvani Fedi from the Chiesa del Tau.

== History and description ==
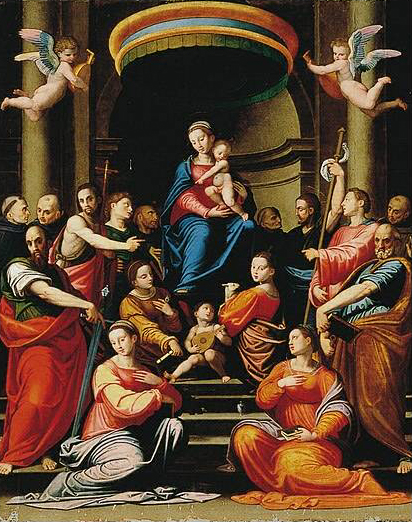
Enthroned Madonna and Child with Saints by Fra Paolino

The first church at the site, built during the age of Lombard rule in 748, was a smaller temple, occupying the area of the presbytery, with an apse in the east. It was dedicated to St Blaise.

In 1143, the church was enlarged by creating the present nave running along a north to south axis. The work continued into the 14th-century. The exterior is characterized by a typical Tuscan blend of Romanesque and Gothic styles, with a polychrome decoration of the façade. Over the portal is a statue of St James, attributed to Orcagna. The bell-tower, much altered over the centuries, was occupied in the 15th century by the Cancellieri family in their battles with the Panciatichi family. A chapel once at its base was frescoed in 1348 by Paolo di Stefano and in 1441 by Bartolomeo da Giovanni. The chapel was torn down in the mid-19th-century.

The interior has been largely turned into a Baroque one in the 17th and 19th centuries. A Madonna and St Cajetan in Glory was painted by Paolo di Matteis for the altar of the Marchetti family, nearby is a fresco with St Agatha and St Eulalia by Gerino Gerini (painter). The altar with the Immaculate Conception attributed to Michelangelo Anselmi and Alessio Gimignani. The main altar has an Enthroned Madonna and Child and Saints Catherine, Appollonia, Mary Magdalen, Agnes, Paul, John the Baptist, Dominic, and others by Fra Paolino. It is said the a figure in profile portrays Girolamo Savonarola as St. Peter the Martyr. Two frescoes were painted by Alessio Gimignani. An Assumption of the Virgin was painted for the Franchi altar. Many of the members of the Forteguerri family were buried here, and of the Greek and Latin scholar Scipione Carteromaco (died 1515).
