= San Domenico, Pistoia =

Church in Tuscany, Italy

Coordinates: 43.9305°N 10.9164°E

San Domenico is a Romanesque and Gothic-style, Roman Catholic church located in the Piazza of the same name, with a north flank of the nave parallel to Corso Silvani Fedi, in Pistoia, region of Tuscany, Italy.

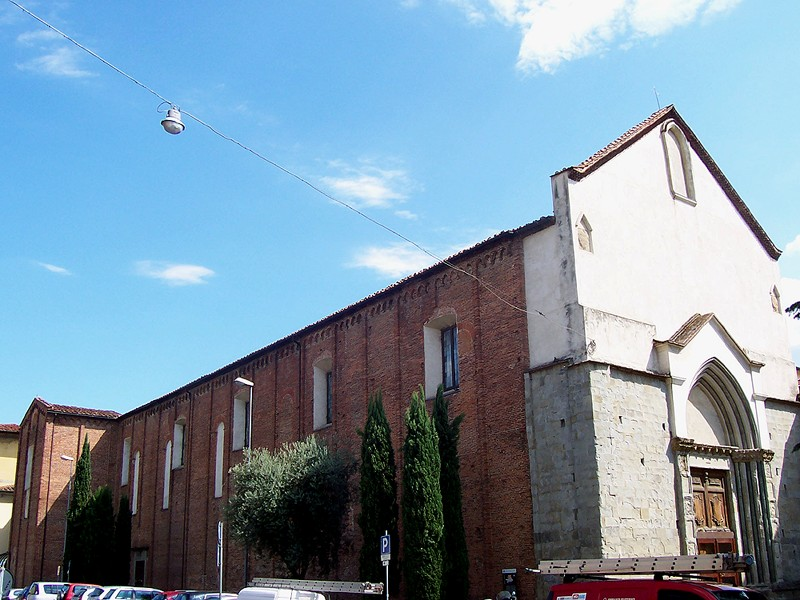
Facade and flank of San Domenico

== History ==
The church structure dates to some time in the mid to late 13th century. Dominican fathers are documented to have preached originally from the small Oratory of the Crucifix (Oratorio del Crocifisso). The latter contains frescoes dating to the 13th century.

The church contains work from the 14th and 15th century, including frescoes by Giovanni Cristiani and Antonio Vite. There is no documentation to substantiate the rumors by later art historians including Giorgio Vasari that either the two Dominican order brothers Sisto and Ristoro, architects of Santa Maria Novella in Florence, or that Giovanni Pisano, were at work here.

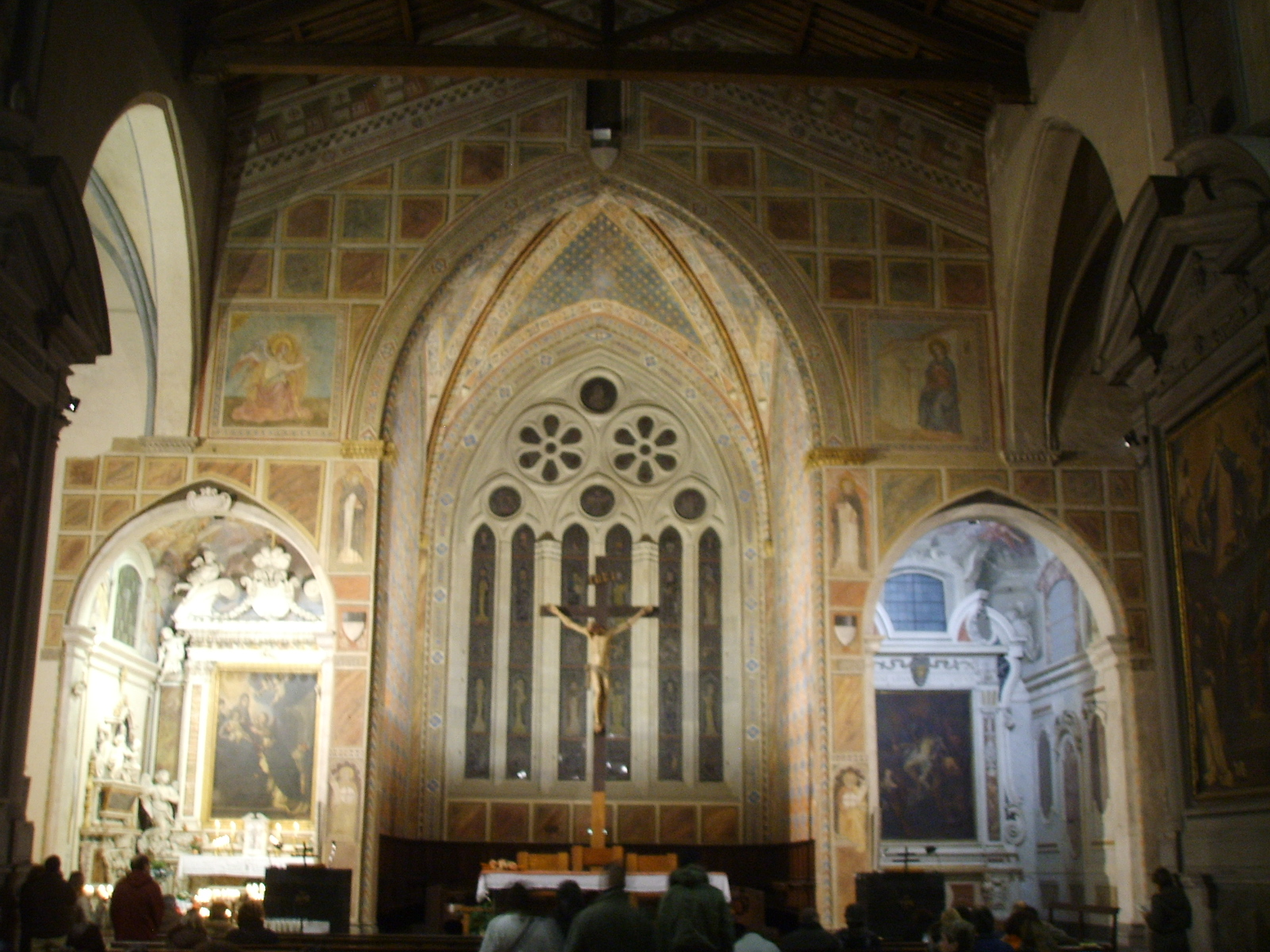
View towards main altar

Traces of late 13th century frescoes are found in the convent and church, some attributed possibly to Coppo di Marcovaldo and his son Salerno.

The tomb of the jurist Filippo Lazzari (first on right), and of the Blessed Lorenzo da Ripafratta, are attributed to Bernardo and Antonio Rossellino. The church also has the tomb of the bishop Andrea Franchi, who led the White Procession during the plague outbreak of 1399. In 1497, the Florentine painter Benozzo Gozzoli died here. The painter Fra Paolino, a Dominican follower of Savonarola painted for this church an Adoration of the Magi and a Holy Conversation. The latter work is now in the church of San Paolo of Pistoia.

The cloister has frescoes depicting the Life of San Domenico by Sebastiano Vini. The church also has frescoes depicting the Life of the Magdalen, painted by Ulisse Ciocchi, Michele Cinganelli, and Giovanni Martinelli: all pupils of Bernardino Poccetti. The painter Giovanni Cristiani painted a now detached Last Judgement for the convent refectory.

The convent was suppressed in 1783; Dominicans returned only in 1928. The church was damaged during the allied bombing of World War II.

== Bibliography for History of Church and Convent ==
These sources are listed in the website below.

- G. Beani, La chiesa e il convento di S.Domenico in Pistoia, Pistoia, 1909
- S. Orlandi, La chiesa monumentale di S.Domenico a Pistoia, Pistoia, 1932
- Il patrimonio artistico di Pistoia e del suo territorio, catalogo storico descrittivo, Pistoia, 1967
- A. Bacchi, Pittura del Duecento e del Trecento pistoiese, in La pittura in Italia. Il Duecento e il Trecento, I, Milano 1986
