= Giovanni Battista Braccelli =

Italian painter and engraver (fl. 1616–1649)

Attila before the city of Rome, engraved by Giovanni Battista Bracelli after Alessandro Algardi, Rijksmuseum, Amsterdam.

Giovanni Battista Bracelli or Braccelli is the name of more than one engraver and painter active in central Italy in the Baroque period, between about 1616 and 1649.

According to Filippo Baldinucci, one Giovanni Battista Braccelli studied under Giovanni Battista Paggi ("il Paggi") and was active in Genova, where he worked in the churches of Santa Maria dei Servi and Santi Cosma e Damiano, and where he died in 1609 at the age of 25. According to Stefano Ticozzi, he was born in 1584, became the most valued assistant to Paggi, and died before his twenty-fifth birthday.

A Florentine Giovan Batista Braccelli was a pupil and collaborator of Jacopo da Empoli. He published in 1624 in Livorno a Bizzarie di varie figure, a book of etchings with a dedication to Don Pietro de' Medici (who died in 1604).

Other mentions are of a Florentine Giovanni Battista Bracelli who was a pupil of Giulio Parigi, and another also known as "Brazzé" or "Il Bigio". It is not clear whether these were different people to those above.

A collection of engravings entitled Figure con instrumenti musicali e boscarecci, published in Rome after 1624, also bears the name Giovanni Battista Bracelli, as does a rare Alfabeto figurato published in Naples in 1632.
