= San Giovanni Decollato, Pistoia =

Church in Pistoia, Italy

Coordinates: 43.931671°N 10.921133°E

San Giovanni Decollato is a Roman Catholic parish church located on Via Memoreto and Via San Pietro in Pistoia, region of Tuscany, Italy. At the other end of Via Memoreto is the Romanesque church of Santa Maria Nuova, and to the left the Oratory of San Desiderio.

== History and description ==
It was founded in the tenth-century in a site then outside the second city walls, affiliated with a hospice tending to pilgrims. In the 11th century, the patronage of Conte Guido enlarged the site and it became affiliated with the Knights Templar, later by 1296 with the Jerosolimitans or Knights of San Giovanni di Gerusalemme (Knights Hospitaller). In 1573, the site was placed under the order of the Knights of Malta. Upon suppression of the orders during the late 18th and early 19th-centuries, the property came into the property of the Corsini family until 1902, when it was granted first to the Salesian order, then in 1907 to the Stigmatines.

In the 17th-century, the church was refurbished under the designs of the priest Raffaello Ulivi. The interior has three paintings by Pietro Marchesini.
