= Santa Maria Nuova, Pistoia =

Church building in Pistoia, Italy

Coordinates: 43.930899°N 10.921087°E

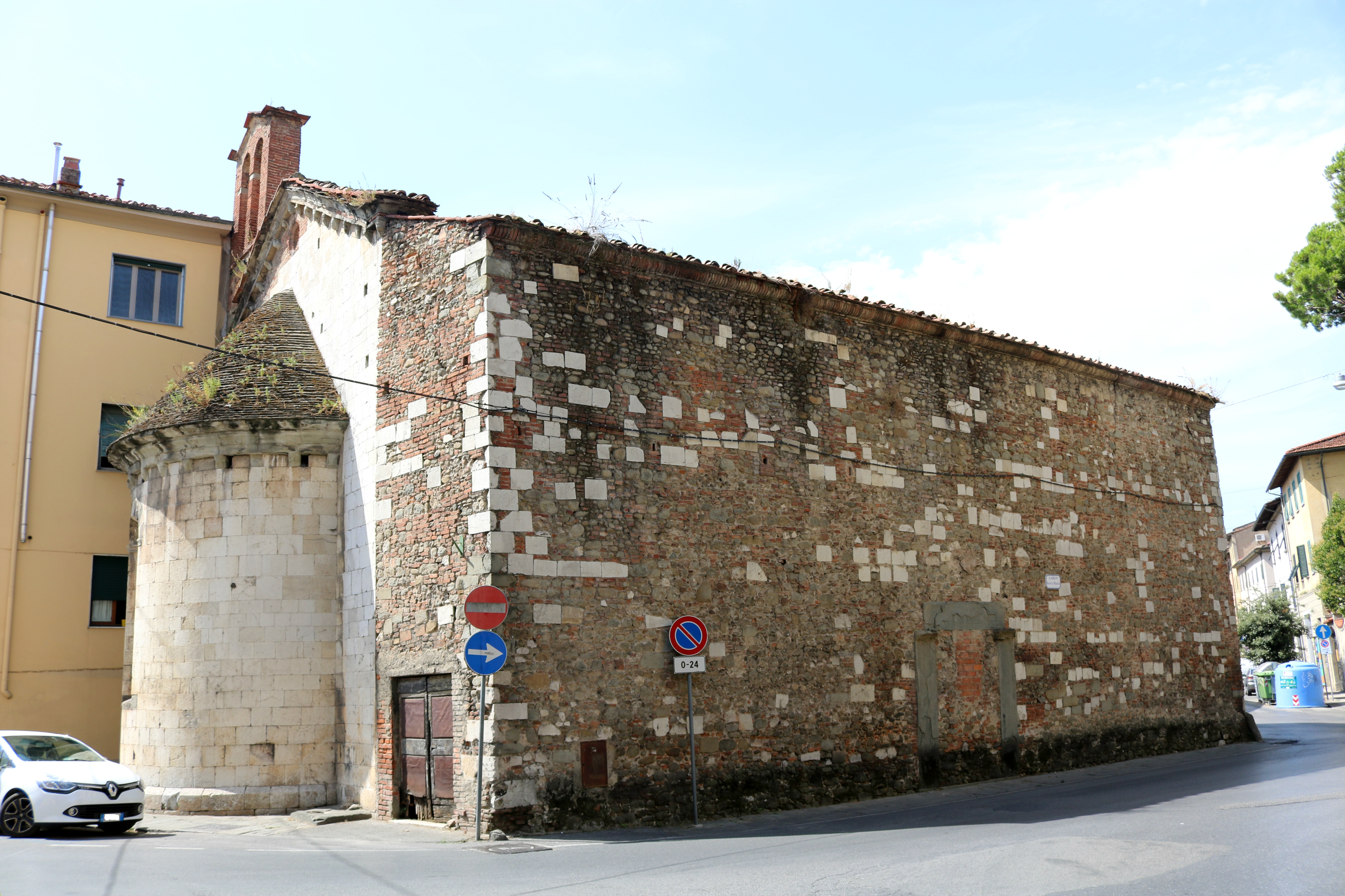
Hemicyle of apse and lateral flank of nave of Santa Maria Nuova

Santa Maria Nuova is a 13th-century, Romanesque architecture, de-consecrated Roman Catholic church located on Via Manrico Ducceschi #2 and Largo Santa Maria, in Pistoia, region of Tuscany, Italy.

== History ==
The church was first erected in 1266 by a magistrate Bono. It was located outside of the second walls of Pistoia, not far from the Santa Barbara Fortress, and took its name from a prior church of Santa Maria in Brana, located here or nearby. The church is diagonal across a street from the Oratory of San Desiderio and near San Giovanni Decollato. In 1606 and later in 1784, it was refurbished. It served as a parish until 1925, when suppressed.

An inventory from 1821, noted that the interior had an altarpiece depicting the Virgin with Saints John the Baptist and Barbara (1606) attributed to Jacopo Vini and a main altarpiece depicting the Purification at the Temple of the Virgin by Domenico Passignano
