= Niccolò di Tommaso =

Italian painter

Niccolò di Tommaso (active 1346–1376) was an Italian painter active in Florence, Naples and Pistoia.

He is documented as joining the Arte dei Medici e Speziali around 1346. He shows the influence of Maso di Banco, but worked with Nardo di Cione on the Strozzi chapel in Santa Maria Novella by 1370. That same year he worked in the church of San Giovanni Fuorcivitas in Pistoia. In 1371 he travelled to Naples to paint a polyptych for the church of Sant’Antonio Abate. On his return to Tuscany, Niccolò frescoed for the Church of Tau, Pistoia. He painted a Coronation of the Virgin (Accademia, Venice), and The Massacre of the Innocents (Uffizi, Florence). He also painted a Madonna del Parto in the church of San Lorenzo, Florence.
