= Bernardino Poccetti =

Italian painter

- Self-portrait, c. 1612, Uffizi, Florence
- Born: 26 August 1548; Florence, Duchy of Florence
- Died: 10 October 1612 (aged 64); Florence, Duchy of Florence
- Education: Michele Tosini
- Known for: Painting
- Movement: Counter-Mannerism

Bernardino Poccetti (26 August 1548 – 10 October 1612), also known as Bernardino Barbatelli or Bernardino delle Grottesche, was an Italian Mannerist painter and printmaker of etchings. He is considered one of the Florentine reformers – the so-called Counter-Maniera (Counter-Mannerism) – along with Santi di Tito, Domenico Passignano, Cigoli, Jacopo da Empoli, Andrea Boscoli, and Gregorio Pagani.

== Biography ==
Bernardino Poccetti was born in Florence in August 1548 into a poor family who lived near Porta San Pier Gattolini, Florence. Orphaned at an early age, he entered the workshop of Michele Tosini, initially training as a decorator of façades and ceilings. In 1570, he enrolled in the Accademia delle Arti del Disegno, the Florentine painters' guild. In the 1580s, he collaborated with Tosini on the extensive decoration of the Chiostro Grande of Santa Maria Novella. From 1583 to 1585, he helped to decorate panegyric frescoes in the Palazzo Capponi-Vettori, Florence. He also completed frescoes in San Pier Maggiore and San Pierino.

In 1592–93, Poccetti began a series of commissions for the Carthusians of Florence and Siena (for whom, as an exception, he travelled outside Florence). The most notable of these is the group of scenes from the Life and Death of St. Bruno (1592–3; Florence Charterhouse). In the Coronation of the Virgin in the Neri Chapel (c. 1599; Florence, Santa Maria Maddalena dei Pazzi), the large-scale, visionary images of saints, angels and putti recall Cigoli’s Madonna of the Rosary (Cortona Cathedral); but Cigoli’s tenebrism was inappropriate for frescoes, and Poccetti reverted to more even lighting for the fresco scenes from the Life of St. Antoninus of Florence (1601–2; San Marco, Florence, cloister) and the decorations of the Chiostro dei Morti and the Pucci Chapel in the Servite church of the Santissima Annunziata, Florence. The characteristically vibrant pastel colours of his frescoes are exemplified in the Deeds of the First Medici Grand Dukes, realized around 1608 in the great Salon of the Palazzo Pitti. His masterpiece are considered the frescoes in the Cappella del Giglio (Cappella Neri) in Santa Maria Maddalena dei Pazzi (1599).

Massacre of the Innocents (Detail), fresco by Poccetti in the Ospedale degli Innocenti (1610)

Poccetti’s drawings (over 800 in Florence, Uffizi; others in London, British Museum, and Vienna, Albertina) were avidly collected by Filippo Baldinucci for Cardinal Leopoldo de' Medici. They range from compositional sketches, such as the Virgin Appearing to a Saintly Monk (c. 1599; Florence, Uffizi), individual figure studies (typically in charcoal, or red and black chalk on blue or white paper) to a fresco cartoon. In his late drawings, such as the preparatory sketches for the decorations of the Ospedale degli Innocenti, Florence, the technique is extraordinary: form is dissolved in light-filled mist; exact contours appear, if at all, only in final pen strokes. Poccetti’s very few paintings on canvas differ significantly from his frescoes; chiaroscural values rather than a play of bright colour predominate in the Adoration of the Shepherds (1597; Florence, Fortezza da Basso) and in St. Andrew Healing a Blind Man in Avignon (c. 1599; Santa Maria del Carmine, Florence).

Poccetti left no vital workshop, although about 40 of his designs were engraved, some by Jacques Callot; his inspiration touched artists including Agostino Ciampelli, Michelangelo Cinganelli and particularly Matteo Rosselli. Pietro da Cortona admired his skill and perhaps also his early unification of painting, sculpture and architecture (e.g. San Pier Maggiore, Florence).

== Other works ==
- Cycle of frescoes in the Santissima Annunziata, Pistoia (1601);
- Frescoes in the cloister of Sant'Antonino in San Marco, Florence (1602);
- Frescoes in Palazzo Usimbardi, now Palazzo Acciaiuoli (1603);
- Frescoes in the Strozzi Chapel in San Bartolomeo a Monteoliveto, Florence (c. 1603);
- Frescoes in the Serragli Chapel in San Marco, Florence (c. 1603);
- Massacre of the Innocents, Ospedale degli Innocenti, Florence (1610);
- Frescoes for the Communicatoio of the Convent of Sant'Apollonia, Florence, Florence (1611).

== Gallery ==
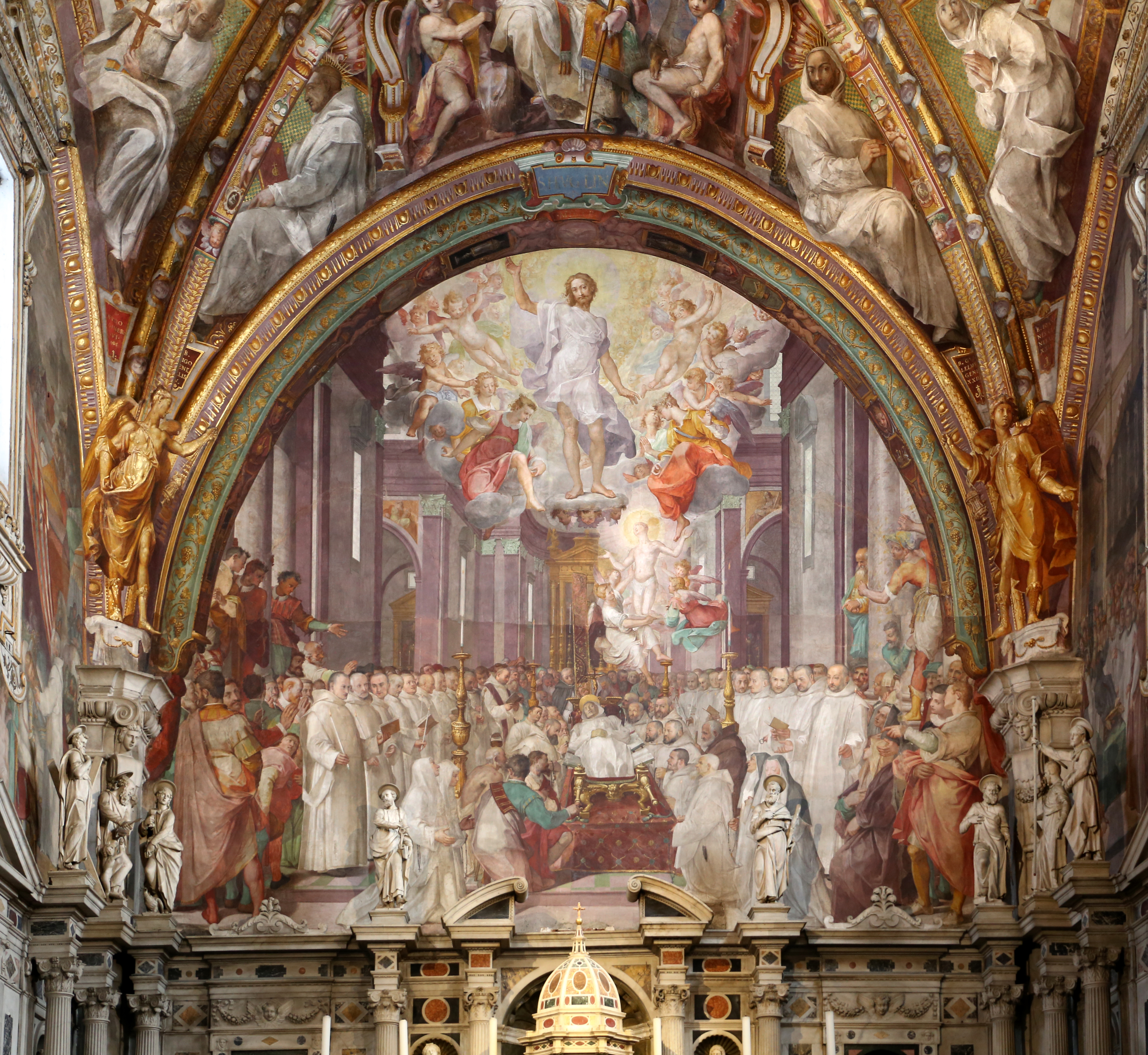
Life and Death of St. Bruno (1592–3), Florence Charterhouse

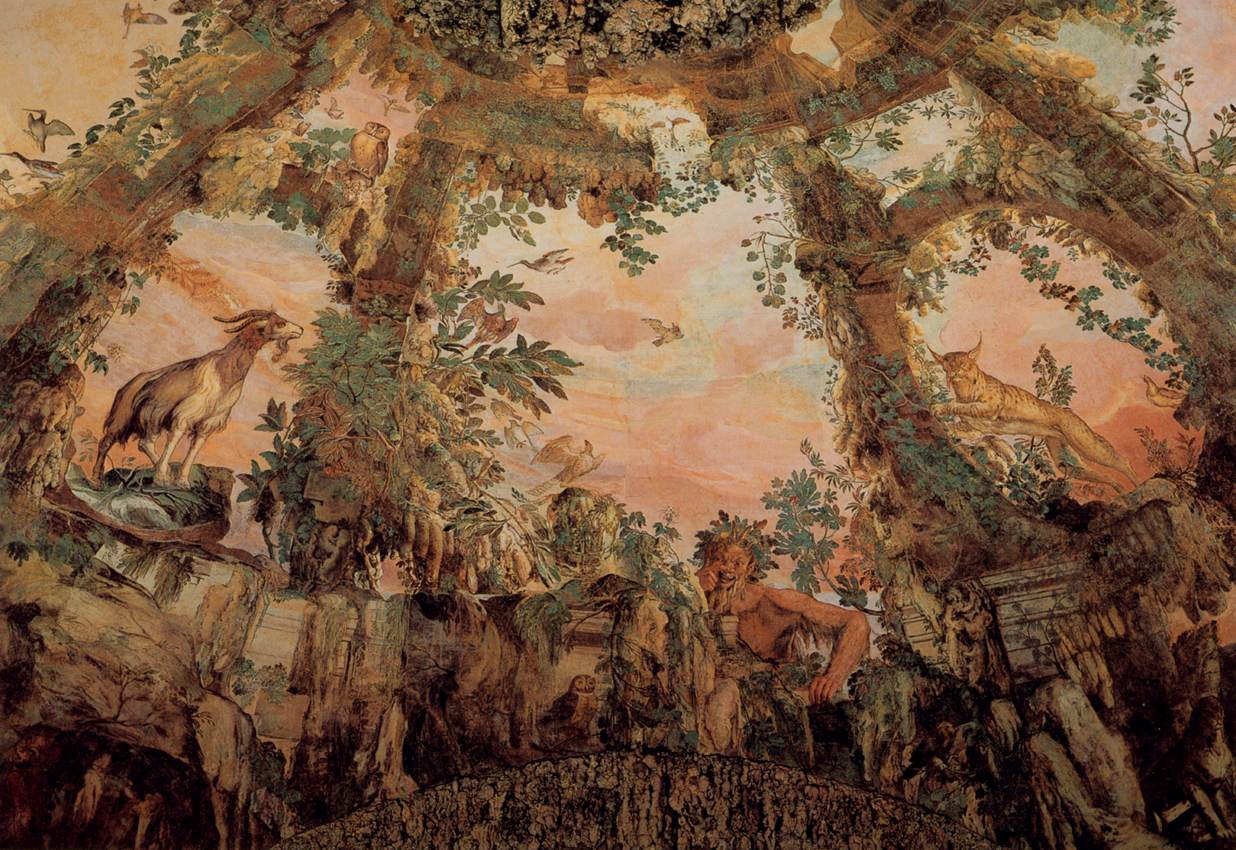
Ceiling fresco in the Grotta Buontalenti, Florence

Fresco on the vault of the hall of Palazzo Capponi-Vettori, Florence

Allegories of Virtues. Fresco by Poccetti in the Serragli Chapel in San Marco, Florence

Christ in Glory. Fresco by Poccetti in the Serragli Chapel in San Marco, Florence

Wedding at Cana. Fresco in the Refettorio Nuovo of Santo Spirito, Florence (1597)

God the Father in Glory and Gifts of the Holy Spirit. Frescoes in the Strozzi Chapel, San Bartolomeo a Monteoliveto, Florence, c. 1603

Glory of the Holy Trinity, c. 1607–1612. Fresco on the vault of Florence Charterhouse

=== Frescoes for Communicatoio of Sant'Apollonia, Florence ===
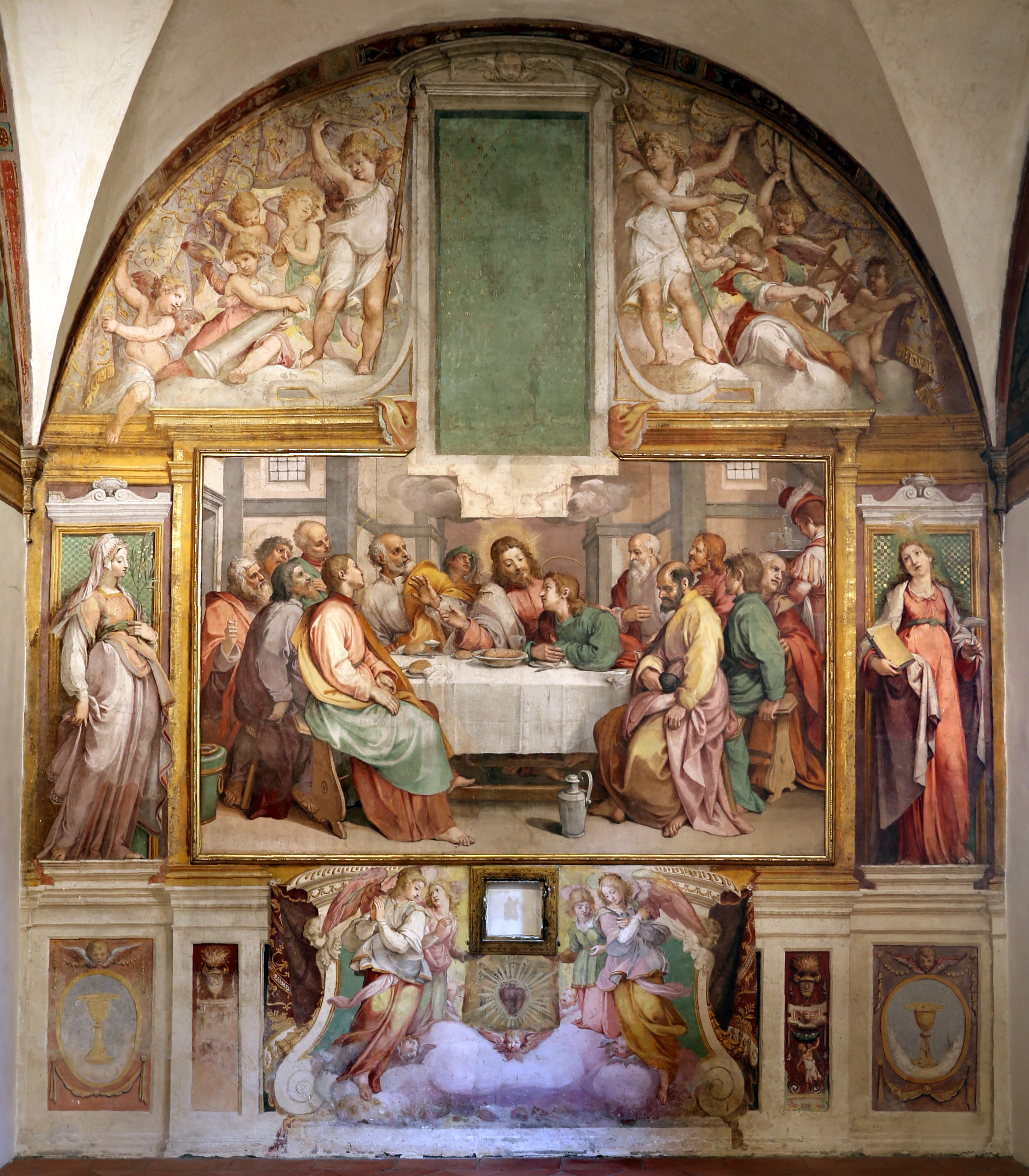
Frescoes for the Communicatorio of Sant'Apollonia

The Last Supper. Detail from the frescoes for the Communicatorio of Sant'Apollonia

The Last Supper (Detail). Fresco for the Comunicatoio of Sant'Apollonia

The Last Supper (Detail). Fresco for the Comunicatoio of Sant'Apollonia

=== Frescoes for vaults of Ospedale degli Innocenti, Florence ===
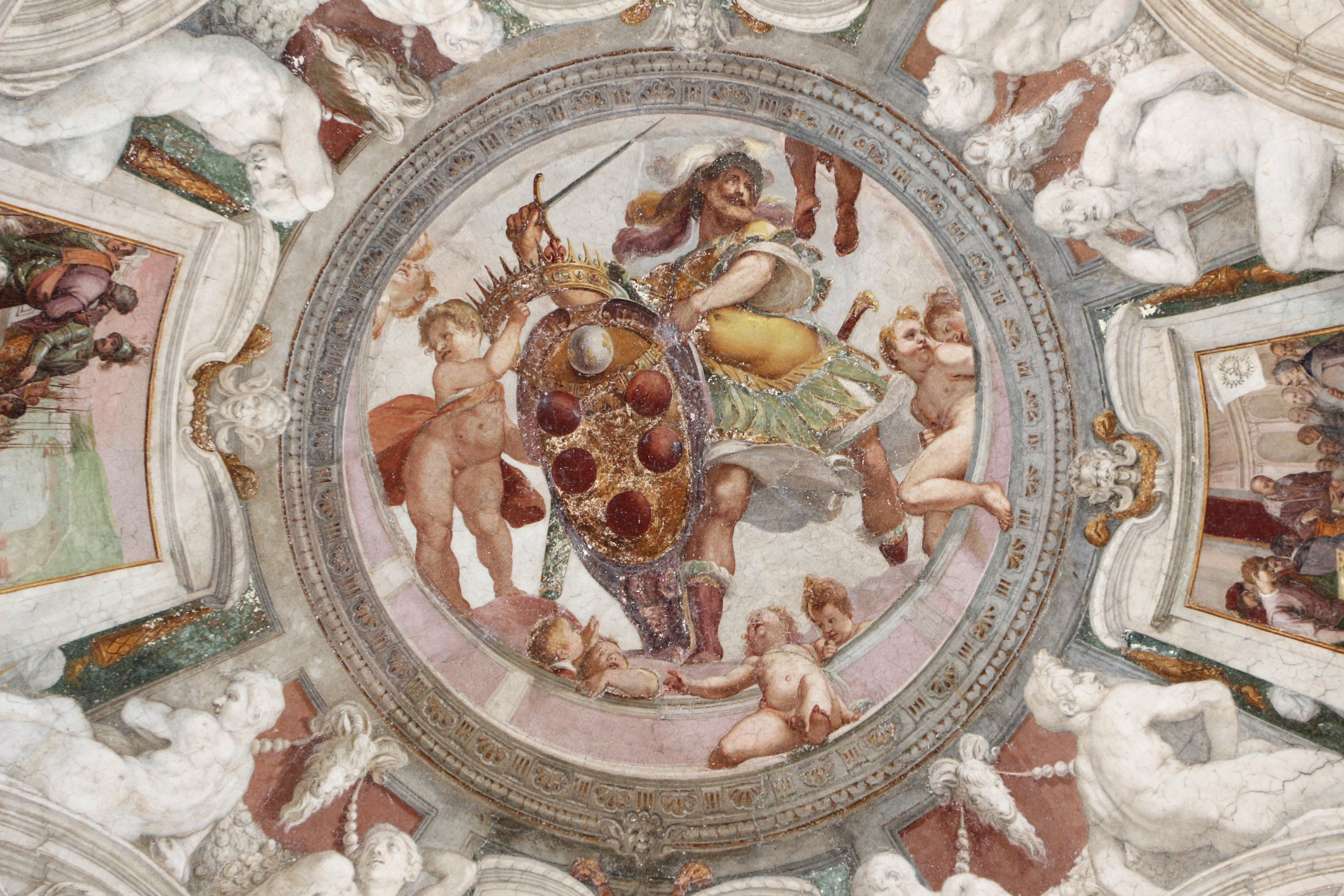
Fresco on the vault of the Ospedale

Ignudi, detail of Poccetti's frescoes on the pendentives of the Ospedale's vault

Allegory of Fortitude, detail of Poccetti's frescoes on the pendentives of the Ospedale's vault

Massacre of the Innocents (Detail), fresco by Poccetti in the Ospedale

=== Frescoes for the Santissima Annunziata, Florence ===
Angels and Virtues, fresco in the Giambologna Chapel in the Santissima Annunziata

Detail of the frescoes on the pendentives of the vault of the Giambologna Chapel

Detail of the frescoes on the pendentives of the vault of Saint Sebastian Chapel

Detail of the frescoes on the pendentives of the vault of Saint Sebastian Chapel

== Bibliography ==
- Freedberg, Sydney J. (1993). Painting in Italy, 1500–1600. Pelican History of Art. Penguin Books Ltd. pp. 627–629.
- Baldinucci, Filippo (1846). Ferdinando Ranalli (ed.). Notizie de' Professori del Disegno (in Italian). Vol. III. Florence: V. Batelli.
- Marcucci, Luisa (1964). "BARBATELLI, Bernardo, detto Bernardino Poccetti". Dizionario Biografico degli Italiani (in Italian). Vol. 6: Baratteri–Bartolozzi. Rome: Institute of the Italian Encyclopaedia. OCLC 883370.
