= Jacopo da Empoli =

Italian painter (1551–1640)

Jacopo Chimenti da Empoli
- Self-portrait, Florence, Uffizi
- Born: Jacopo Chimenti; 30 April 1551; 475 years ago Florence, Grand Duchy of Tuscany
- Died: 30 September 1640 (aged 89); Florence, Grand Duchy of Tuscany
- Education: Maso da San Friano
- Known for: Painting
- Movement: Counter-Mannerism
- Relatives: Jacopo Sansovino grandfather

Jacopo da Empoli (30 April 1551 – 30 September 1640), also known as Jacopo Chimenti, was an Italian Counter-Maniera painter. Like his contemporary, Santi di Tito, he moved into a style often more crisp, less contorted, and less crowded than mannerist predecessors like Vasari.

== Biography ==
=== Training and early works ===
Jacopo da Empoli was born in Florence on 30 April 1551. He was the son of Chimenti di Girolamo, a cloth merchant, and of Alessandra Tatti, the daughter of the sculptor Jacopo Sansovino. His baptismal name was Jacopo Chimenti, but he became known as Jacopo da Empoli after his father's birthplace.

Jacopo apprenticed under the Mannerist painter Maso da San Friano. The Adoration of the Shepherds (The Box, Plymouth) is one of a small number of paintings attributed to his earliest years. The two framing figures and the hooded shepherd on the left echo Maso’s style, while the full, sharply modelled forms suggest that Jacopo had studied the art of Giorgio Vasari. However, these sources are modified by Jacopo’s greater naturalism, and the ruined hut, the simple, devout shepherds and demure little angels recall the accessible and direct religious paintings of Santi di Tito. In the Virgin in Glory between St. Ivo and St. Luke (1579; Paris, Louvre), the first work securely attributed to him, the softer yet more monumental forms show the artist moving away from his teacher’s influence, though the lively little angels and some of the faces, such as the woman’s profile on the right, still recall Maso da San Friano.

Like Santi di Tito, Jacopo was both returning to the naturalism of late 15th-century Florentine art, with its emphasis on drawing from life, and inspired by the classicism of the early 16th-century Florentine tradition. He studied ceaselessly from the art of Fra Bartolomeo, Andrea del Sarto and Pontormo. Cardinal Carlo de’ Medici commissioned him to make a copy (untraced) of Fra Bartolomeo’s Resurrection of Christ (Florence, Palazzo Pitti). Jacopo paid particular attention to the work of Andrea del Sarto and made copies (untraced) of his famous frescoes in the atrium of Santissima Annunziata. But he felt the closest affinity with Pontormo and copied many of his works, of which the only ones remaining (Florence Charterhouse) are of Pontormo’s five frescoes of scenes from the Passion (1523–4) in Florence Charterhouse. Through such studies Jacopo formed his own ‘firm style, with fine drawing, without errors, with excellent drapery, good facial expression, and sometimes also very good use of colour’.

In the last quarter of the 16th century the influence of Venetian painting spread to Florence, mainly through the Veronese artist Jacopo Ligozzi and through Domenico Passignano. From the beginning of the 1590s these trends were encouraged by the art of Cigoli and of Gregorio Pagani. Florentine painters developed a freer, more painterly technique and a more sensitive treatment of light and shade. The Immaculate Conception (1591; San Remigio, Florence), with its dramatically foreshortened figures, enveloped in radiant light, reveals Jacopo’s response to this new influence. Yet, although the effects of light are Venetian, in other respects the painting remains within a Florentine tradition. The arrangement of the figures around the Virgin recalls Vasari and Federico Zuccari, while the startling three-dimensionality of the figures against the light is reminiscent of Bronzino’s frescoes in the chapel of Eleonora di Toledo in the Palazzo Vecchio.

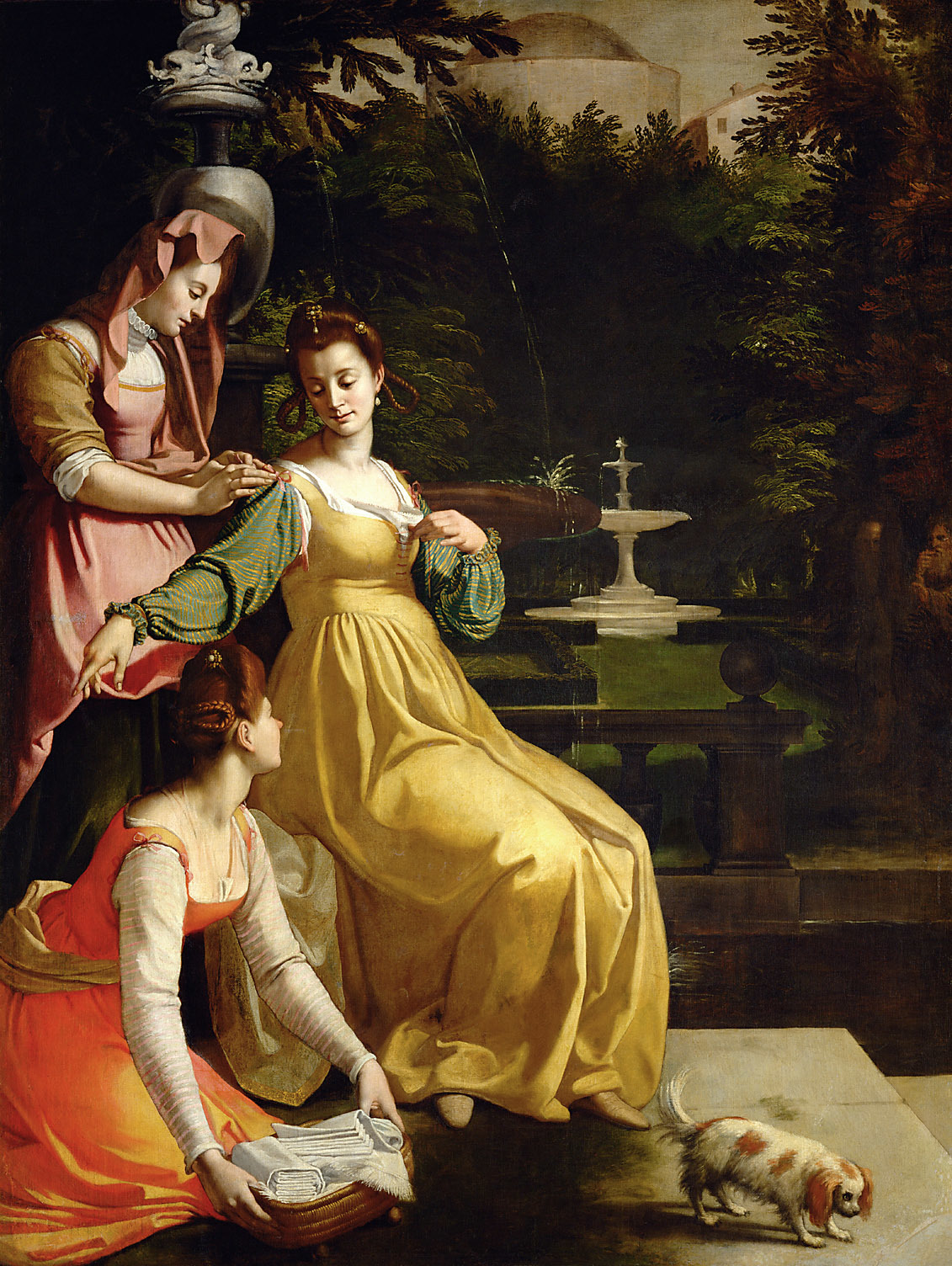
Susanna Bathing (1600), Vienna, Kunsthistorisches Museum

Jacopo’s study of Bronzino, though undocumented, was undoubtedly intensive, for his drawing, his analysis of form and his approach to his subject-matter became increasingly lucid. This aspect of his art, which nonetheless remained indebted to his earlier sources, found its fullest expression in Our Lady of Help (1593; Florence, Palazzo Pitti), which reveals an interest in Raphael, and in the works painted towards the end of the 16th century, such as the Assumption of the Virgin (Florence, Santissima Annunziata), the Annunciation (1599; Pontedera Cathedral), the Stigmatization of St. Francis (Florence, Convento dei Cappuccini di Montughi) and Susanna Bathing (1600; Vienna, Kunsthistorisches Museum). The Susanna, one of Jacopo’s most beautiful and famous paintings, still evokes the art of the early 16th century, yet the emphasis on objects carefully selected and lucidly described looks forward to the art of Orazio Gentileschi.

=== Mature and late works ===
Between 1600 and 1610 Jacopo painted a series of large canvases for churches in Florence and elsewhere in Tuscany. These are noble works, executed in confident style in which it is no longer possible to identify the stylistic sources. The series includes the Annunciation (1603; Florence, Santa Trinita, Strozzi Chapel), where the patch of sky surrounding the angel and breaking through the walls of the cell looks forward to the Baroque; the Presentation in the Temple (1604; ex-Empoli, Collegiata; destr. World War II); the Christ and the Blind Man (1605; Florence, Santissima Annunziata, Brunaccini Chapel); the Delivery of the Keys to St. Peter (1607; Florence, Santa Trinita, Usimbardi Chapel); and St. John the Baptist Preaching ( 1608; Florence, San Niccolo sopr’Arno, Gianni Chapel). These imposing works are distinguished not only by the dignity and nobility of the figures but also by the spatial clarity, the new emphasis on landscape and the lively realism of expression and costume. The colours are bright and strong, and the forms modelled by a clear light.

St. Charles Borromeo and the Rospigliosi Family (1613), San Domenico, Pistoia

After 1610 Jacopo’s work shows signs of contact with the rich, florid painting introduced into Florentine circles by the pupils of Cigoli and Pagani, among them Cristofano Allori, Giovanni Biliverti and Matteo Rosselli. This new influence appears in St. Charles Borromeo and the Rospigliosi Family (1613; San Domenico, Pistoia) and St. Eligius the Goldsmith (1614; Florence, Uffizi) painted for the goldsmiths’ and silversmiths’ guild. In these canvases there are more ample forms, a richer brushwork, more spacious settings and compositions, and more sumptuous costumes and accoutrements, derived from Matteo Rosselli.

Jacopo’s most important works date from 1610–20. They include the Calling of St. Peter (Impruneta, Santa Maria dell’Impruneta), which retains the classic clarity and balance of his early works, St. Ivo, Protector of Orphans (1616; Florence, Palazzo Pitti), which has always been considered Jacopo’s masterpiece, and the Baptism (1620; San Francesco, Pisa). In the same period Jacopo also painted secular works, including Michelangelo Presenting the Plans for San Lorenzo to Pope Leo X (1617–19) for the Casa Buonarroti, Florence (in situ), which is close to works by Tuscan Caravaggisti.

Few works can be dated to Jacopo’s final years, in which his pace of work seems to have slowed. Between 1621 and 1625 he painted still lifes, of which about ten are known. These include two Kitchen Scenes (both Florence, Palazzo Pitti), one dated 1621, the other 1624; a Larder with Hare, Game and Pig’s Head (Bergamo, priv. col.) and a pair of still-lifes in the Molinari–Pradelli collection in Bologna; Larder with Fruit, Vegetables and Ham (1625) and its pendant, Larder with Vegetables, Eggs and Fish. In all of these works the abundant still-life objects are arranged parallel to the picture plane in clear and lucid compositions, whose severity recalls contemporary still lifes by Alejandro de Loarte. These paintings have always surprised critics because of their divergence from the dominant trends of contemporary Florentine painting. They may have been painted purely for Jacopo’s own amusement, yet they were widely influential.

In 1628 Jacopo painted the Virgin in Glory with Saints (Florence, Santissima Annunziata, Del Palagio Chapel) and the Nativity (Florence, S Michele Visdomini). The latter work seems to be a résumé of all Jacopo’s art: the figure of the Virgin recalls his early contacts with Santi di Tito, the shepherds derive from Cigoli, while the ample forms and richly textured fabrics are indebted to more recent influences. In his last decade Jacopo painted two versions of the Creation of Adam (1632; Florence, Uffizi, 1633; priv. col.). The Virgin Presenting the Child to St. Francis (after 1633; San Gaetano, Florence, Franceschi Chapel) may be considered his last work. By then he was almost completely inactive and was forced to sell his numerous drawings in order to live. He died on 30 September 1640, aged 89. Jacopo had many pupils, including Felice Ficherelli, Giovanni Battista Brazzè (Il Bigio), Giovanni Battista Vanni, and Virgilio Zaballi. His younger brother, Domenico Chimenti, born in Empoli, was also a painter.

== Stereogram controversy ==
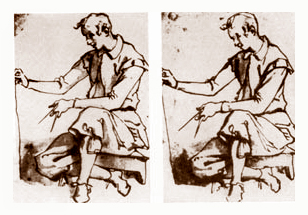
Jacopo drawing cited for stereoscopic appearance (c. 1600).

Around 1600, Jacopo created a pair of drawings that seem to show the same figure from two different vantage points, such as the left and right eyes of an observer. In 1859, the images were rediscovered by Alexander Crum Brown, who suggested that they were intended to create a stereoscopic image. The drawings might have been done to complete a commission for Giambattista della Porta to be used in a book on optical illusions called De refractione optices parte libri novem (1593). According to Nicholas Wade, precise measurements of the drawings demonstrate that the pair of drawings are not perfectly stereoscopic, with significant parts actually pseudoscopic, implying that any stereoscopic effects were accidental.

== Selected works ==
Portrait of a Man, National Gallery of Denmark, Copenhagen

- Adoration of the Shepherds (early 1570s), oil on panel, 82 x 64.6 cm, The Box, Plymouth;
- Three Marys at the Tomb (1570s), oil on canvas, 181.7 x 150.5 cm, Blanton Art Museum, Austin, Texas;
- Madonna and Child with the Young St. John the Baptist (c. 1575), oil on panel, 72.7 × 57.2 cm, Museum of Fine Arts, Houston;
- Lamentation of Christ (c. 1576), oin on panel, 39 x 29 cm, Musée Fesch, Ajaccio;
- Madonna in Glory with St. Luke and St. Ives (1579), Louvre, Paris;
- Sacrifice of Isaac (1590s), oil on copper, 32 x 25 cm, Uffizi, Florence;
- Susanna Bathing (1600), oil on canvas, 172 x 229 cm, Kunsthistorisches Museum, Vienna;
- Preaching of John the Baptist (1608–1609), oil on canvas, 294 x 184 cm, San Niccolò Oltrarno, Florence;
- St. Charles Borromeo and the Rospigliosi Family (1613), oil on canvas, 53,98 x 36,83, San Domenico, Pistoia;
- Honesty of St. Eligius (1614), oil on canvas, 300.5 x 190 cm, Uffizi, Florence;
- St. Ives, Protector of Widows and Orphans (1616), oil on canvas, 287 x 211 cm Palatine Gallery, Florence;
- Michelangelo presents his model of San Lorenzo to Leo X (1617–1619), Casa Buonarroti, Florence;
- Still Life with Games (1620s), oil on canvas, 114 x 152 cm, priv. coll.;
- Judgement of Midas (1624), oil on canvas, 180 x 200 cm Pistoia, Museo Civico;
- The Wedding of Caterina de Medici to Henry II (c. 1605), Uffizi, Florence;
- Drunkedness of Noah (1615–1620), Uffizi, Florence;
- St. Clare Receiving the Veil from St. Francis of Assisi (1620), oil on canvas, 152,5 x 117,2 cm, Musée des Beaux-Arts de Caen;
- Still life (c. 1625), oil on canvas, 76 x 11.5 cm Pushkin Museum, Moscow.
Lamentation of Christ, Musée Fesch, Ajaccio

Three Marys at the Tomb, 1570s, Blanton Museum of Art

Honesty of St. Eligius, Uffizi, Florence

Delivery of the Keys to St. Peter, Santa Trinita, Florence

The Calling of St. Matthew, Santa Maria al Pignone, Florence

Madonna and Child with the Young St. John the Baptist, Museum of Fine Arts, Houston

Drunkness of Noah, Uffizi, Florence

The Sacrifice of Isaac, Uffizi, Florence

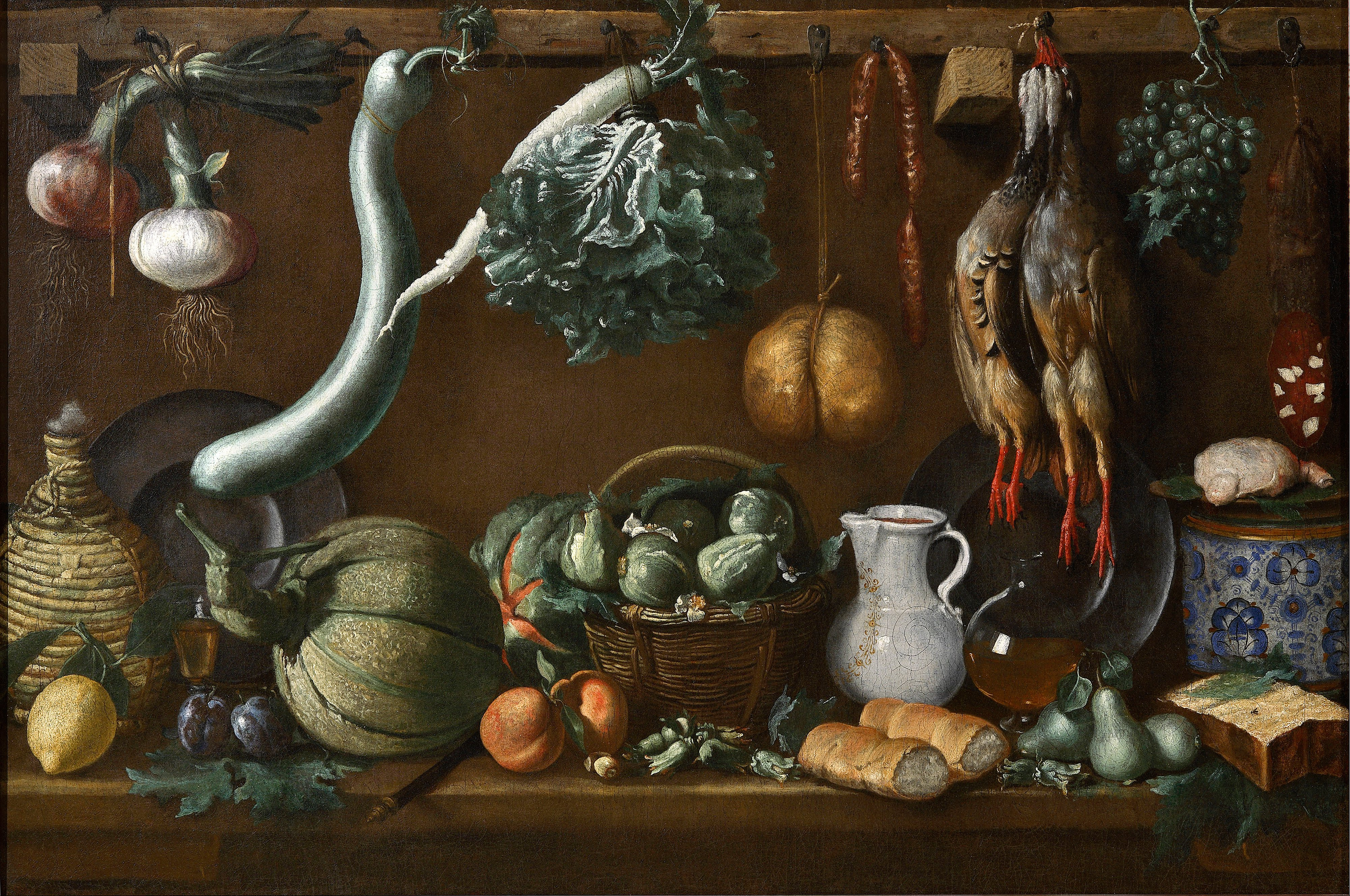
Still life, Pushkin Museum, Moscow

Four Ages of Woman: Infancy, Musée Fesch, Ajaccio

Adoration of the Shepherds, The Box, Plymouth

St. John the Baptist Preaching in the Desert, San Niccolò Oltrarno, Florence

== See also ==
- Santi di Tito
- Francesco Curradi
- Carlo Dolci

== Bibliography ==
- Baldinucci, Filippo (1846). Ferdinando Ranalli (ed.). Notizie de' Professori del Disegno. Vol. III. Florence: V. Batelli. p. 5–18.
- Hobbes, James R. (1849). Picture collector's manual adapted to the professional man, and the amateur. London: T&W Boone.
- Chiappini Bianchini, M. Adelaide (1985). "DA EMPOLI, Iacopo, detto Iacopo Chimenti". Dizionario Biografico degli Italiani (in Italian). Vol. 31: Cristaldi–Dalla Nave. Rome: Institute of the Italian Encyclopaedia. ISBN 978-88-12-00032-6.
- Freedberg, Sydney J. (1993). Painting in Italy, 1500-1600. Pelican History of Art. Penguin Books. pp. 630–632.
