= Antonio Vite =

Italian painter

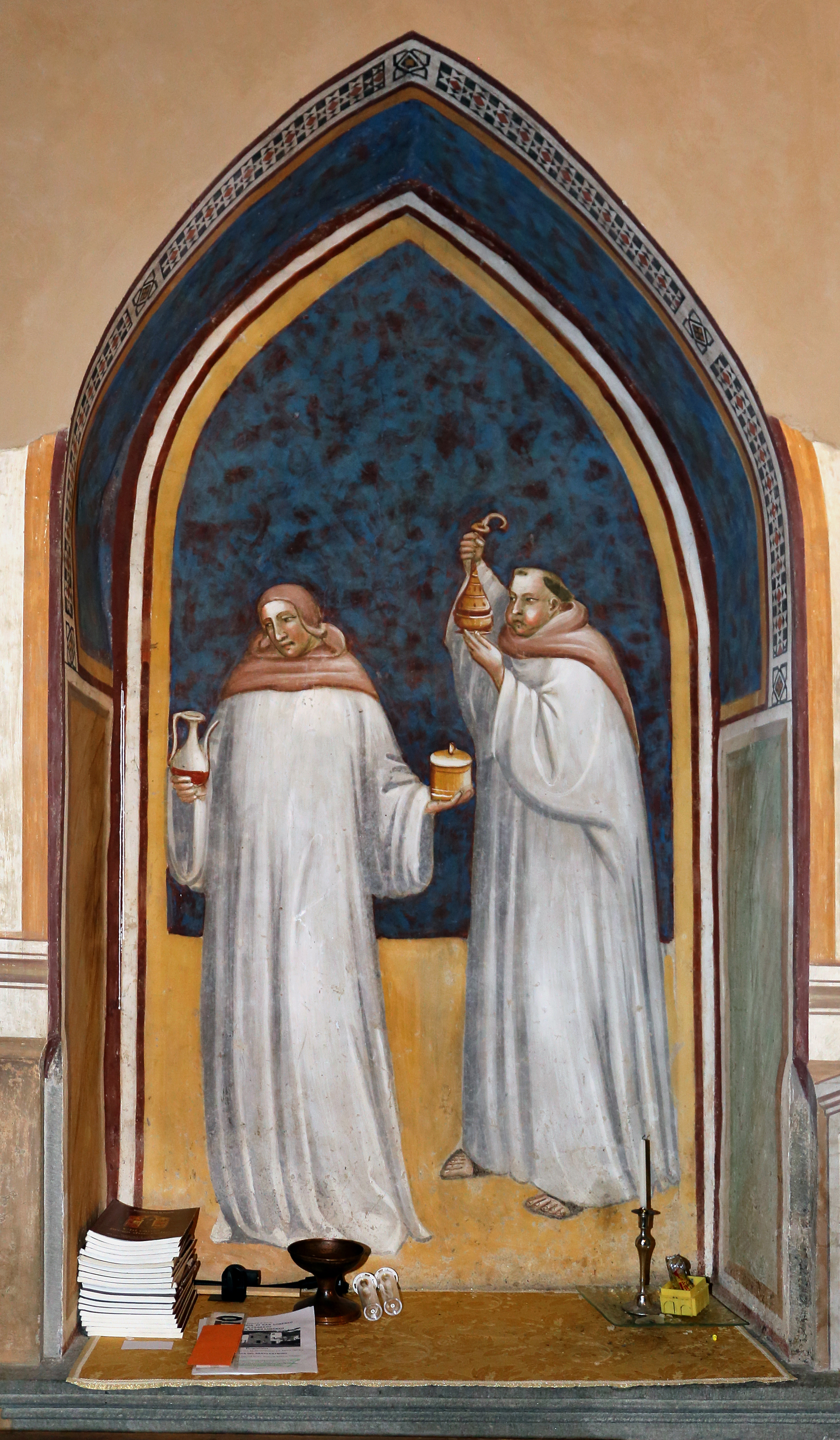
fresco by Antonio Vite, Chapelle des Obizzi, San Francesco, Pescia

Antonio Vite was a fourteenth century Italian painter of the early 15th century.

He was a pupil of Gherardo Starnina, and was born at Pistoia. He was active around the year 1428, and was perhaps identical with one Antonio Filippo da Pistoia, whose name occurs in records of the period. He is said to have worked in the Campo Santo at Pisa. He also worked at the Palazzo del Ceppo in Prato, as well as in the church of San Domenico, Pistoia. Other information dates him as being part of the Pistoia town council in 1378. The 15th century Tuscan architect Ventura Vitoni is said to have been the grandson of Antonio.
