= Sebastiano Vini =

Italian painter

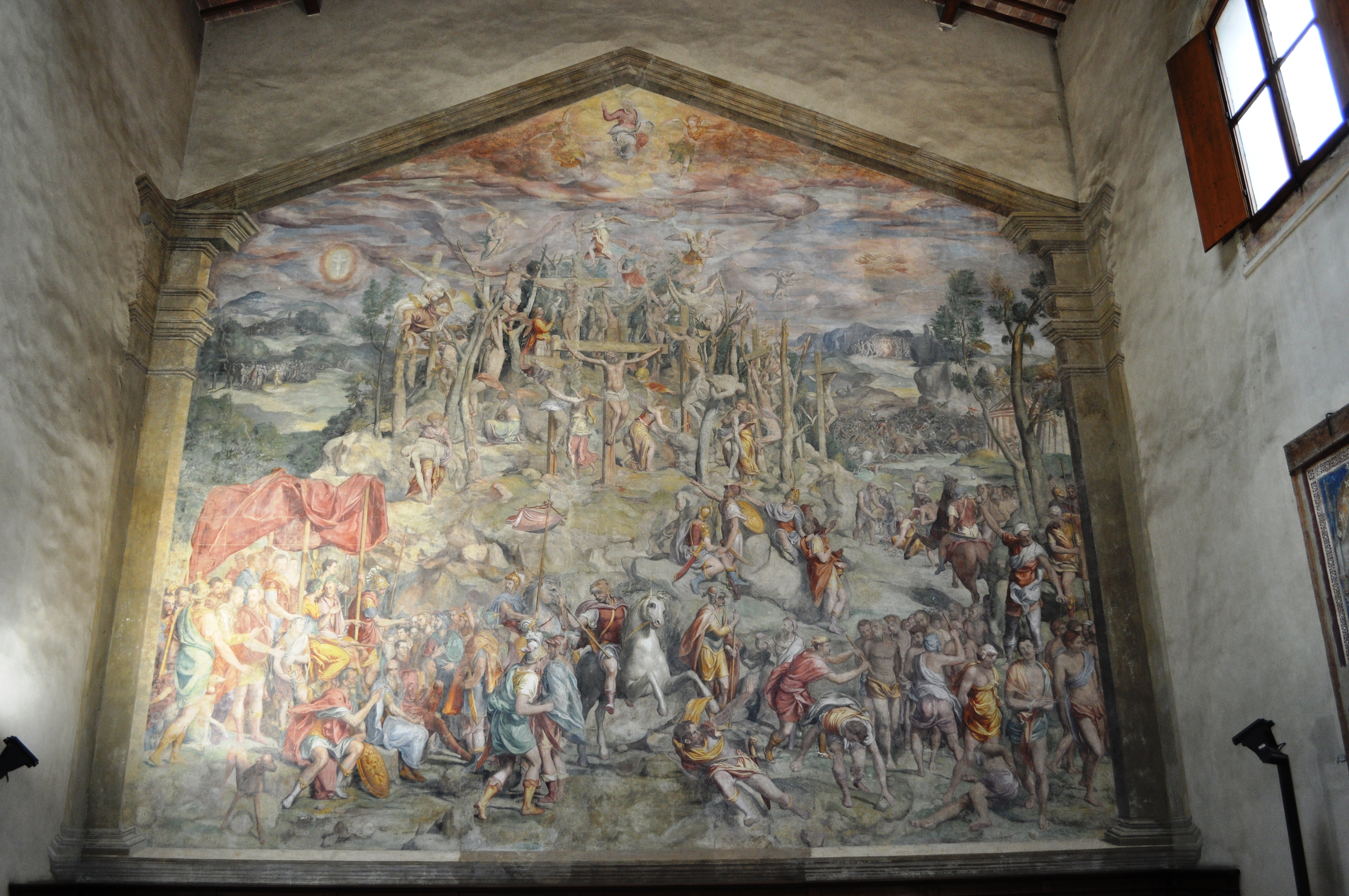
10.000 Martyrs or Crucifixion of San Desderio, fresco in San Desiderio, Pistoia

Sebastiano Vini, also known as Bastiano Veronese (c. 1515 in Caprino Veronese – August 11, 1602 in Pistoia) was an Italian painter of the Renaissance period, active mainly in Tuscany.

== Biography ==
He was the son of Giovanni Piero. It is unknown under whom or where he trained, but his work shows the influence of Paolo Veronese. By 1548, he had married in Pistoia and remained there most of his life. His son, Jacopo Vini was also a painter.

He was prolific in Pistoia. Among his works was an Annunciation (1552) for the later-suppressed church of San Pierino alla Porta Lucchese, then moved to the Sacristy of the Prepositura del Montale. He painted a Nativity for the main altar of the Conservatory of San Giovanni Battista. He painted for the churches of Letto and of the Monks of San Sebastiano. He painted another Annunciation for the church of San Giovanni Fuoricivitas, and a Presentation at the Temple for the church of the Servites, Santissima Annunziata.

He painted a large fresco (1596?) for the counter-facade of the Oratory of San Desiderio and for the church and cloister of San Domenico. He made few works outside Pistoia, including Cutigliano and Florence.
