= Fra Paolino da Pistoia =

Italian painter

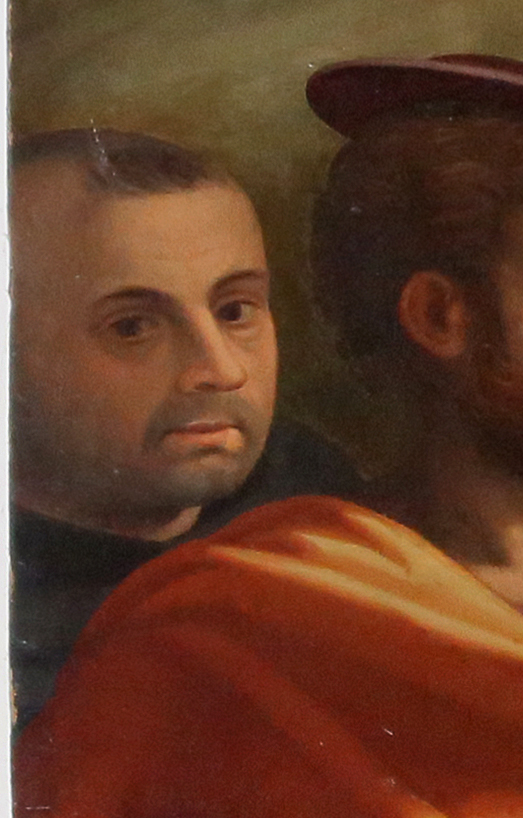
Self-portrait

Fra Paolino da Pistoia OP (1490 – August 3, 1547) was an Italian painter of the Renaissance period, active in Tuscany. He was a son of the painter Bernardino del Signoraccio. He was a Dominican friar who painted in a style similar to Fra Bartolomeo.

He painted religious paintings, and was mentioned by Vasari in his Vite as an heir of Fra Bartolomeo. He joined the Dominican order at the age of 57. One of his works can be found in the church of San Paolo di Pistoia.
