= Oratory of San Desiderio, Pistoia =

Church building in Pistoia, Italy

Coordinates: 43.931005°N 10.921489°E

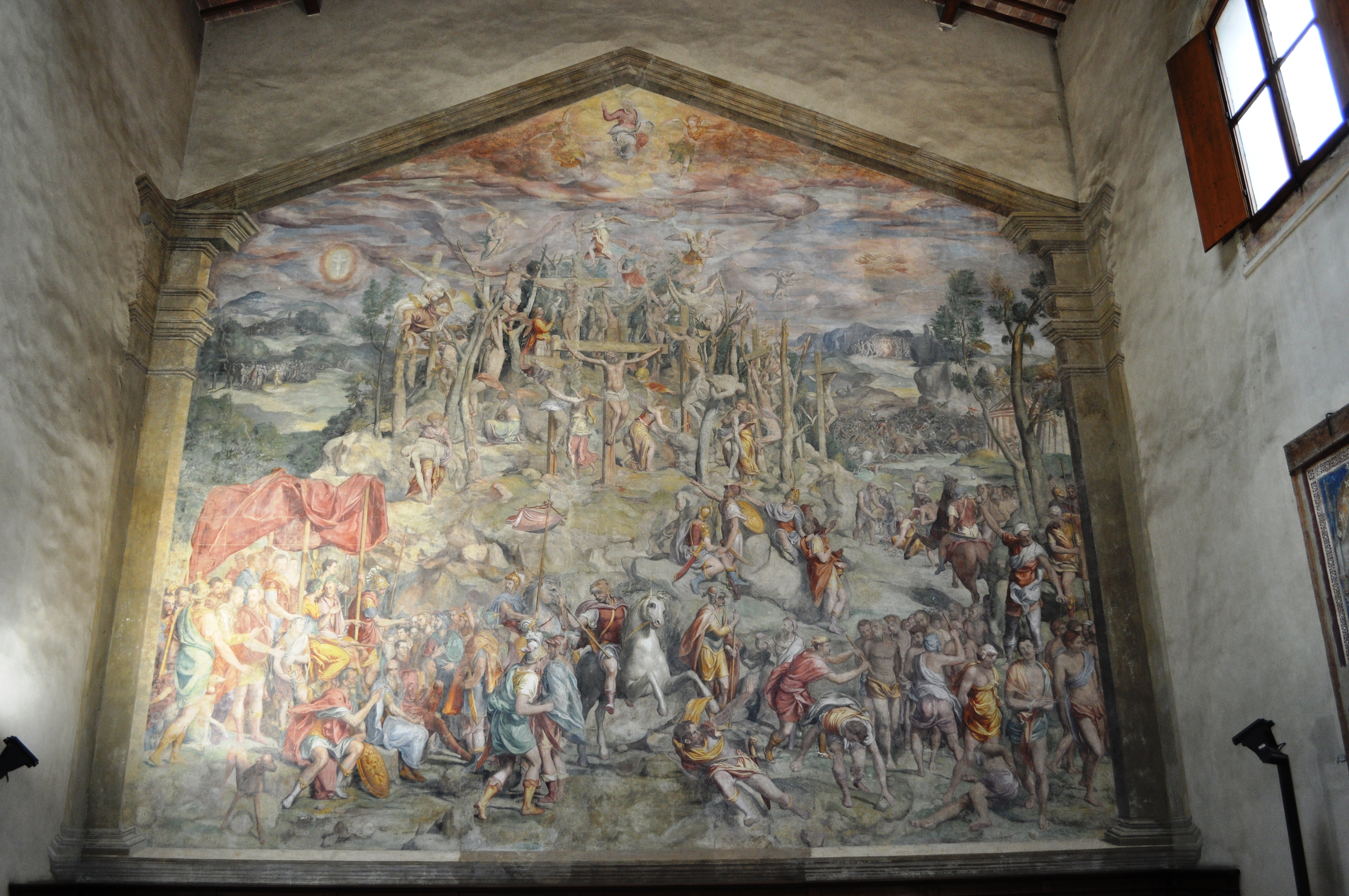
Crucifixion of San Desderio

The Oratory of San Desiderio is a prayer hall located on Via Laudesi #53 in Pistoia, region of Tuscany, Italy. It houses 16th century paintings by Sebastiano Vini, Domenico Cresti (also called il Passignano), Francesco Curradi, and Matteo Rosselli. The oratory is diagonally across from the apse of Santa Maria Nuova.

The church was attached to a hospital, later converted into a Benedictine convent of nuns, putatively of the Mantellate order. In 1516, it became property of the Franciscan order until suppressed in 1786. Purchased by the Amati family, whose ancestor had patronized the decoration of the oratory. This family arranged in 1844 to have church reconsecrated. The oratory's counterfacade contains a massive fresco by Vini depicting the Crucifixion of St Desiderio. The colorful scene is crowded and varied, and the superior panoramic has a gallery of tortuous crucifixions. In the oratory's coffered ceiling were eleven canvas by Cresti, Curradi, and Rosselli.
