= Alessandro Allori =

Italian painter

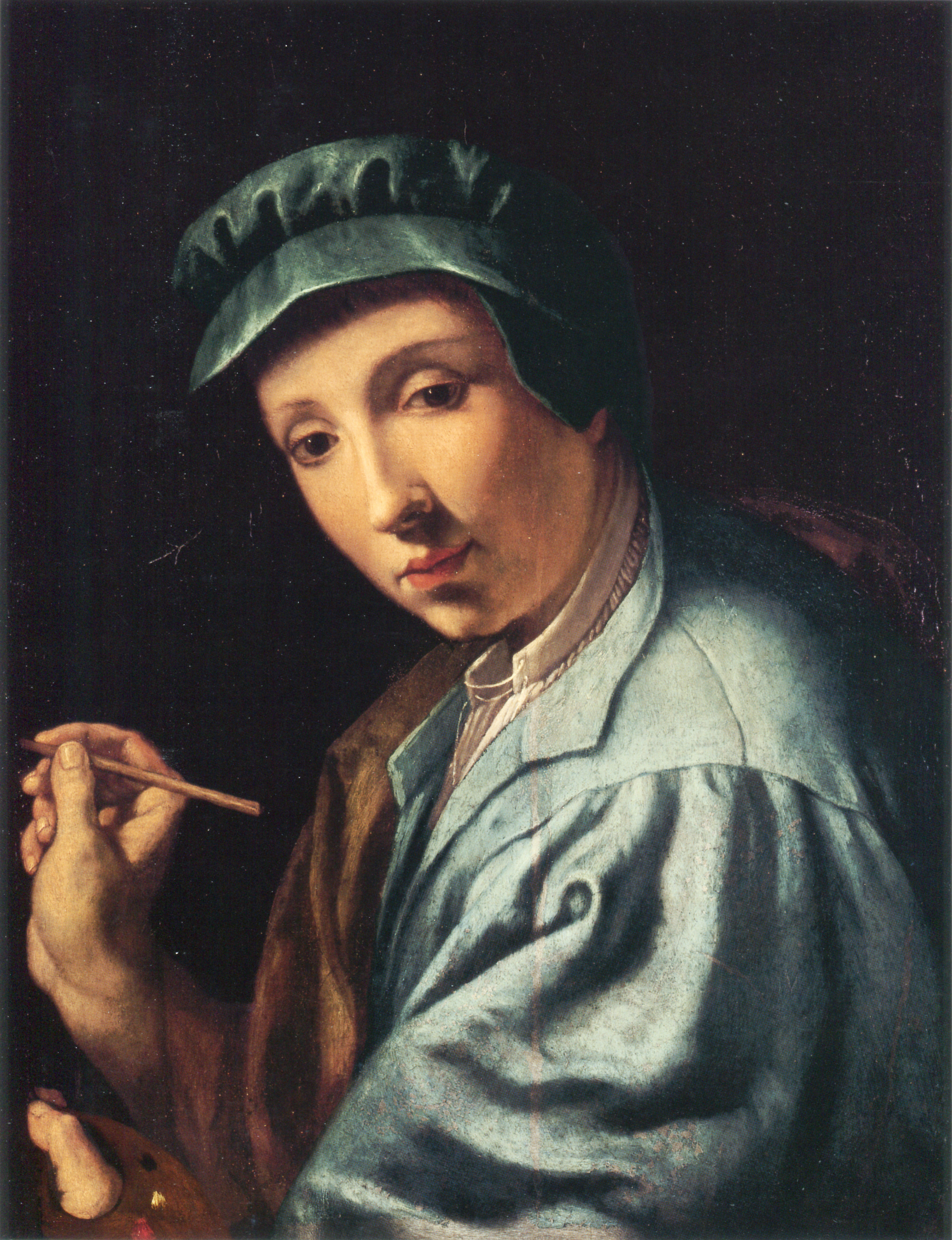
- Self-portrait by Allori, c. 1555
- Born: 31 May 1535; Florence, Italy
- Died: 22 September 1607 (aged 72); Florence, Italy
- Known for: Painting
- Movement: Mannerism

Alessandro di Cristofano di Lorenzo del Bronzino Allori (Florence, 31 May 1535 – 22 September 1607) was an Italian painter of the late Mannerist Florentine school.

== Biography ==
After the death of his father in 1541, Allori was brought up and trained in art by the mannerist painter Agnolo Bronzino, a close friend of the family. Both Alessandro and his son Cristofano sometimes used the name "Bronzino" in adulthood. Allori supplemented his training with a study trip to Rome between 1554 and 1560, and with anatomical research which included the dissection of human corpses, provided by the Hospital of Santa Maria Nuova.

In the prime of his career, Allori headed one of the "two most important workshops in Florence in the second half of the 16th century" (the other was led by Santi di Tito). He served as First Consul of the Accademia del Disegno in 1573, and was made head of the Arazzeria Medicea, Florence's state-owned tapestry workshop, in 1581. Allori also worked, under the guidance of Giorgio Vasari, among the team of artists who decorated the Studiolo of Francesco I. He contributed four painted panels: a Banquet of Cleopatra, a landscape with figures diving for pearls, and portraits of Cosimo I de' Medici and Eleanor of Toledo, the parents of Francesco I. Between 1578 and 1582 he worked in the Medici Villa di Poggio a Caiano, expanding a fresco of Tribute to Caesar which Andrea del Sarto had painted in the 1520s. Allori modified his style and copied figures to harmonize with the work of del Sarto, who was revered by the artists of Florence. In the same way, Allori expanded Franciabigio's fresco Triumph of Cicero in the same hall with figures copied from his frescoes in the Chiostro dello Scalzo, Florence.

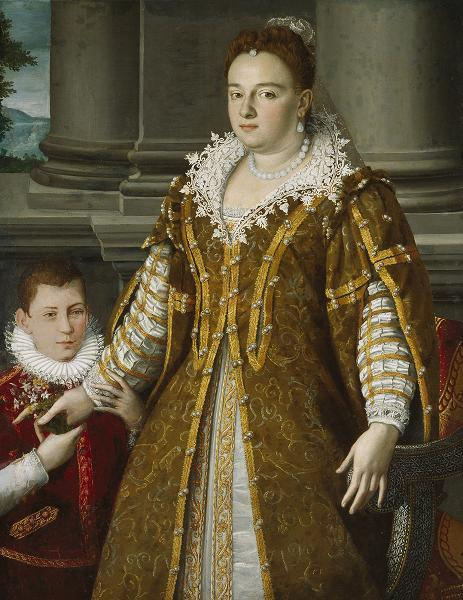
Portrait of Grand Duchess Bianca Capello de Medici, by Allori, Dallas Museum of Art

S. J. Freedberg derides Allori as derivative, claiming he illustrates "the ideal of Maniera by which art (and style) are generated out of pre-existing art." The cold and polished appearance of his painted figures makes them resemble statues as much as living beings. The art historian Simona Lecchini Giovannoni is more positive, remarking that Allori gives life to these "grandiose, introverted figures" by surrounding them with realistic depictions of plants and flowers, household furniture, and textiles; the paintings "approach the spectator, not with dialogue and sentiment, but through the tangible evidence of objects and details".

Among his collaborators was Giovanni Maria Butteri and his main pupil was Giovanni Bizzelli. Cristofano dell'Altissimo, Cesare Dandini, Aurelio Lomi, John Mosnier, Alessandro Pieroni, Giovanni Battista Vanni, and Monanni also were his pupils. He was the father of the painter Cristofano Allori (1577–1621).

In his Lives of the Most Excellent Painters, Sculptors, and Architects, Vasari says that the relationships between Jacopo Pontormo and his pupil Bronzino, and between Bronzino and Allori, resembled those between fathers and sons; he consequently describes the three as a kind of artistic dynasty, despite the lack of literal family ties. In some ways, Allori is the last of the line of prominent Florentine painters, of generally undiluted Tuscan artistic heritage: Andrea del Sarto worked with Fra Bartolomeo (as well as Leonardo da Vinci), Pontormo briefly worked under Andrea, and trained Bronzino, who trained Allori. Subsequent generations in the city would be strongly influenced by the tide of Baroque styles pre-eminent in other parts of Italy.

== Main works ==
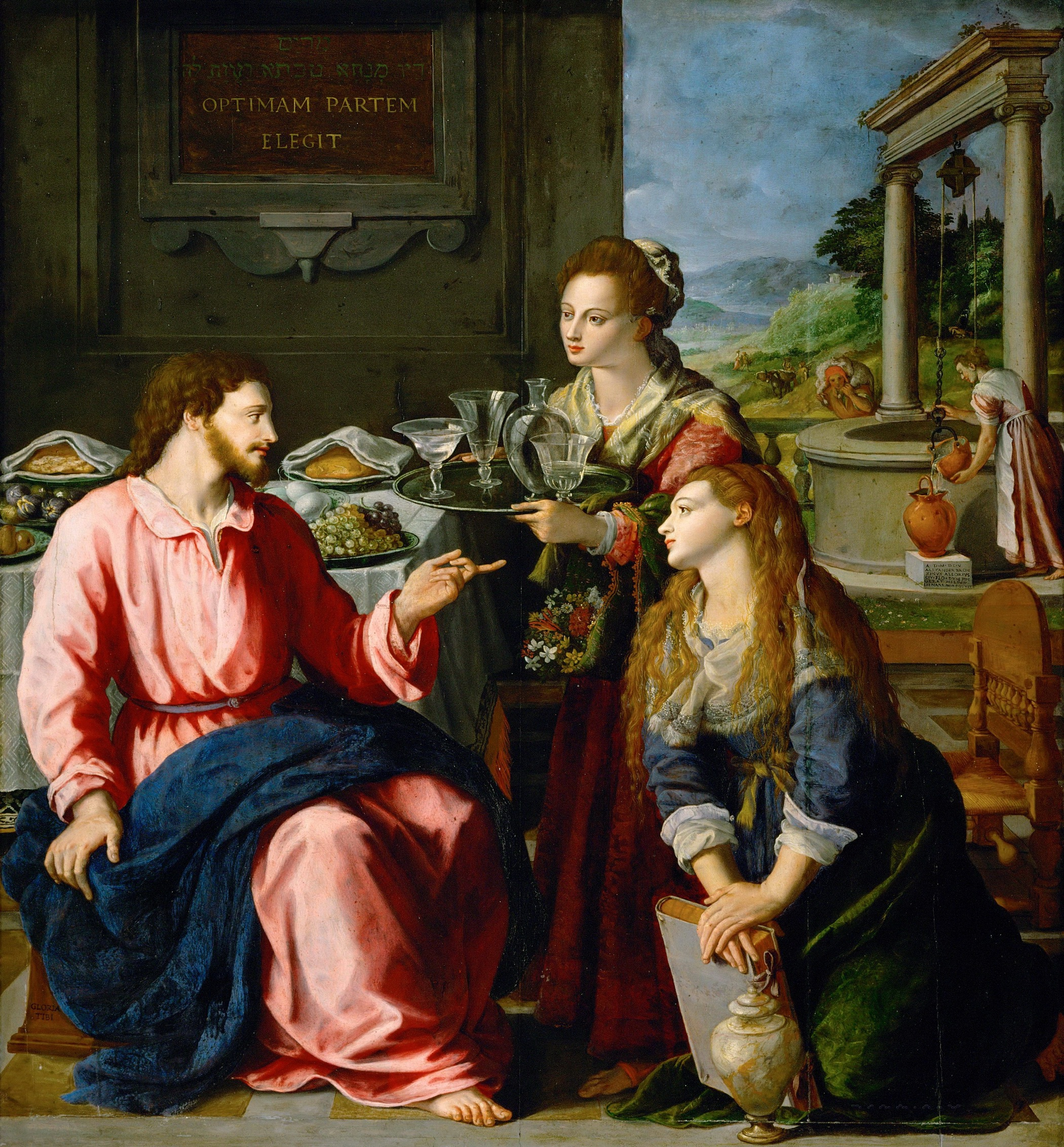
Christ with Mary and Martha, oil on wood, 125 x 118 cm Kunsthistorisches Museum

- Portrait of a Young Man (1561; Ashmolean Museum, Oxford)
- Pearl Fishing (1570–72, Studiolo of Francesco I, Palazzo Vecchio, Florence)
- Christ and the Samaritan Woman (Altarpiece, 1575, Santa Maria Novella, now Prato)
- Portrait of a Lady in Black and White (1590-99; Isabella Stewart Gardner Museum, Boston)
- Road to Calvary (1604, Rome)
- Dead Christ and Angels, (Museum Fine Arts, Budapest)
- Portrait of Piero de Médici, (São Paulo Art Museum, São Paulo)
- Susanna and the Elders (202 × 117 cm, Musée Magnin, Dijon)
- Allegory of Human Life
- The Miracle of St. Peter Walking on Water
- Venus and Cupid, (Musée Fabre, Montpellier)
- Additions to Andrea del Sarto's Tribute to Caesar (1582; Villa di Poggio a Caiano)

In 2006 the BBC foreign correspondent Sir Charles Wheeler returned an original Alessandro Allori painting to the Gemäldegalerie, Berlin. He had been given it in Germany in 1952, but only recently realized its origin and that it must have been looted in the wake of World War II. The work is possibly a portrait of Eleonora (Dianora) di Toledo de' Medici, niece of Eleonora di Toledo, and measures 12 cm x 16 cm.

== Gallery ==
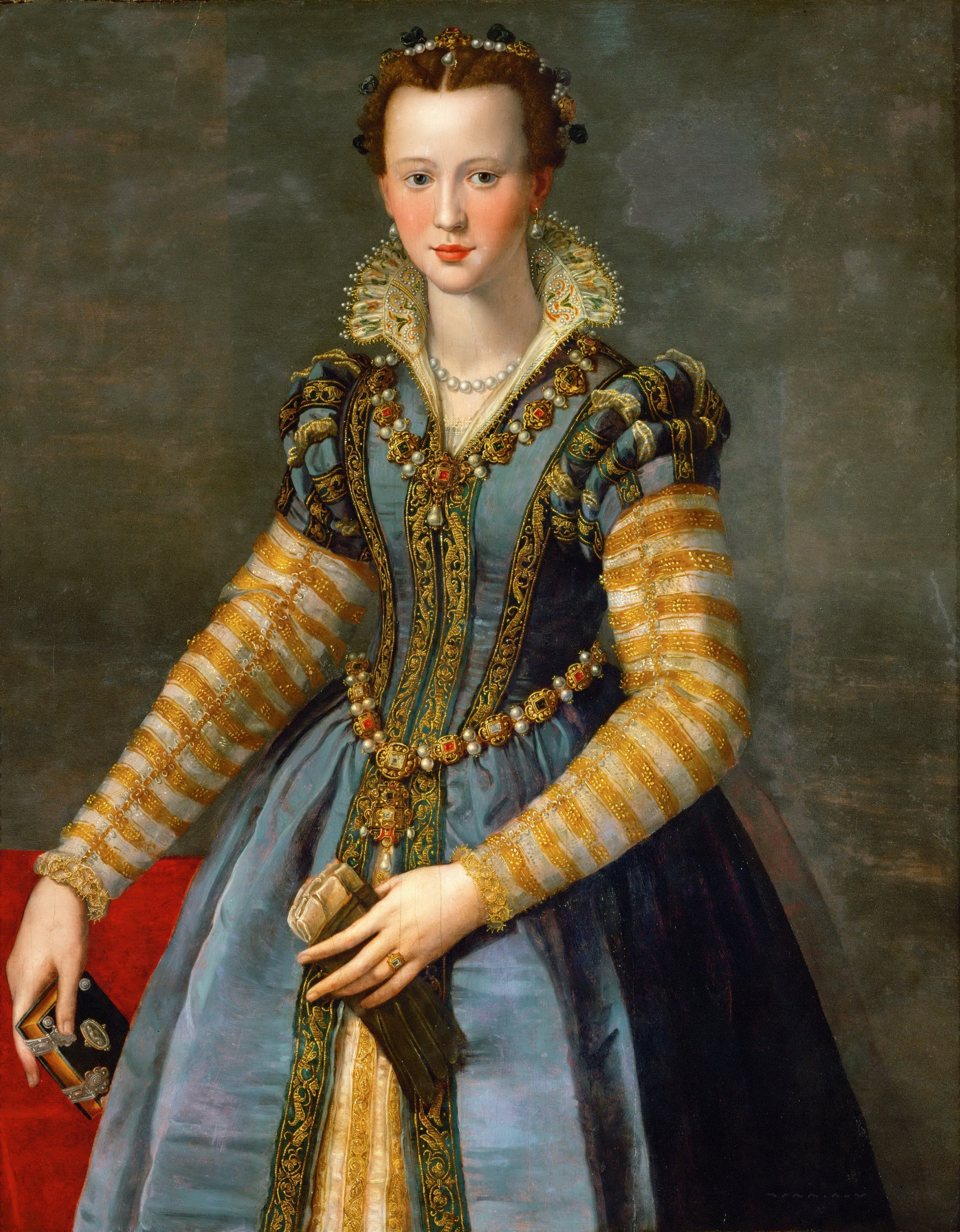
Maria de Medici (probably), c. 1555

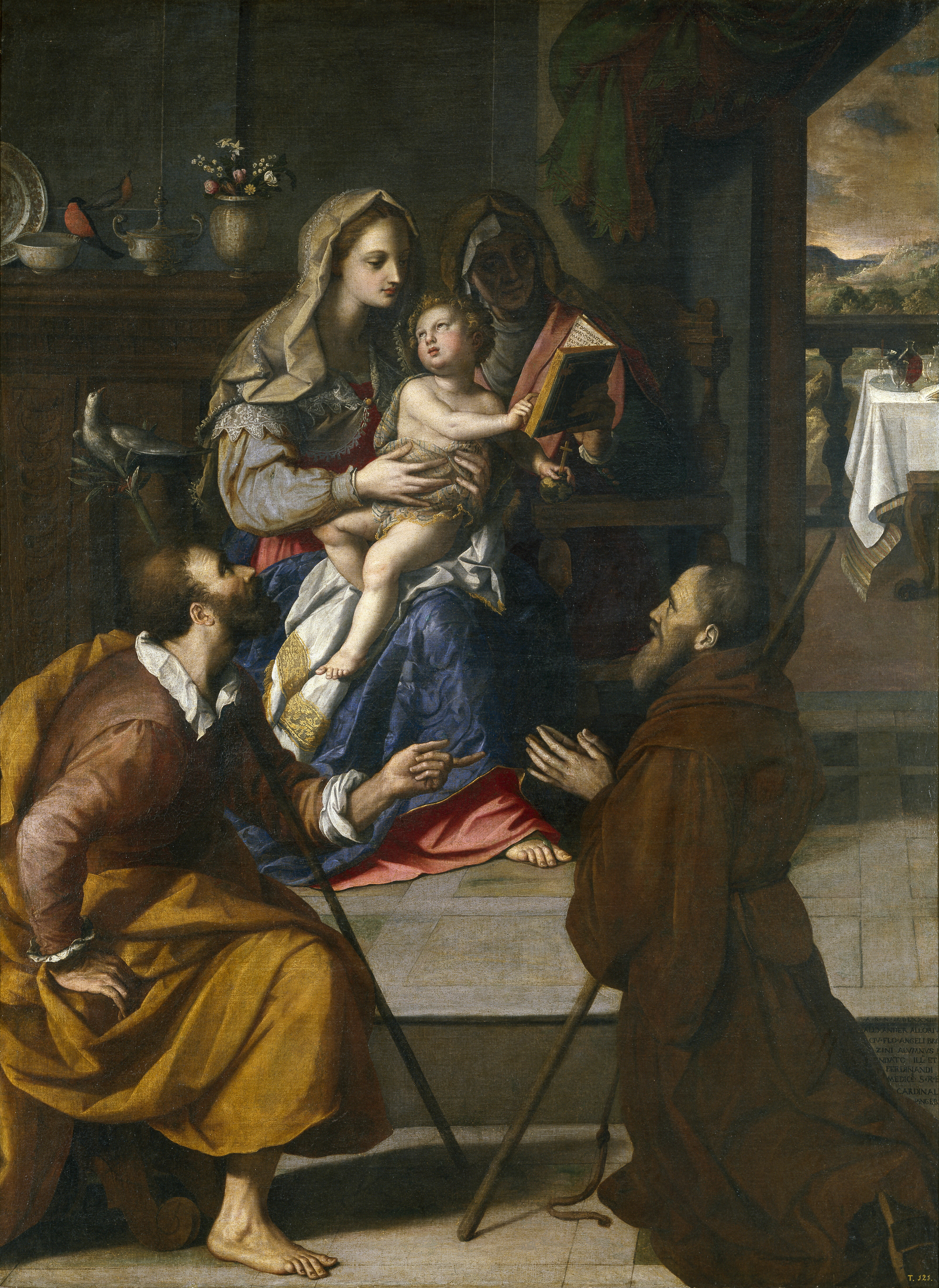
Holy Family with Cardinal Fernando de Médicis, 1584

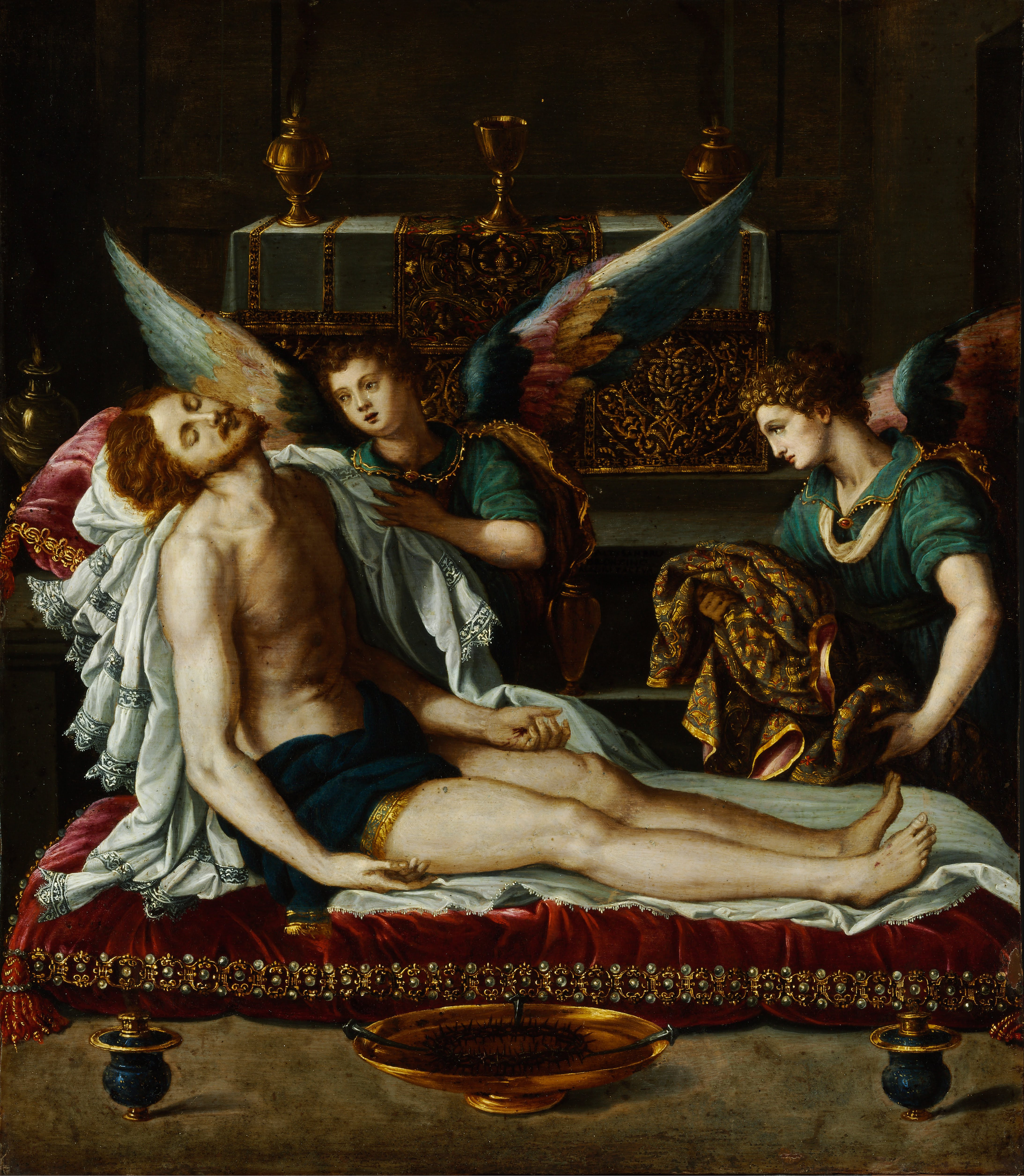
The Body of Christ Anointed by Two Angels, c. 1593

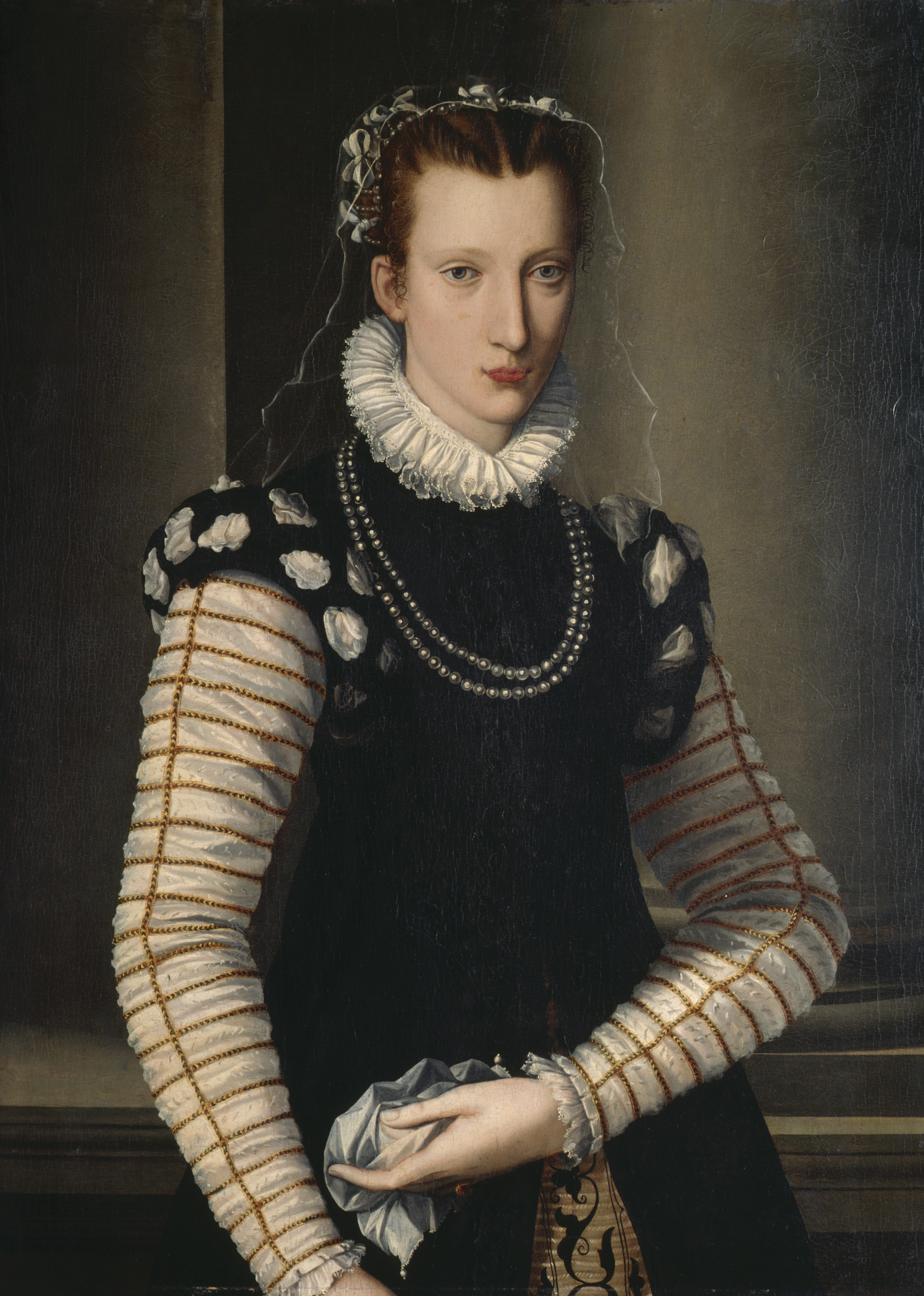
Portrait of a Lady in Black and White, 1590s

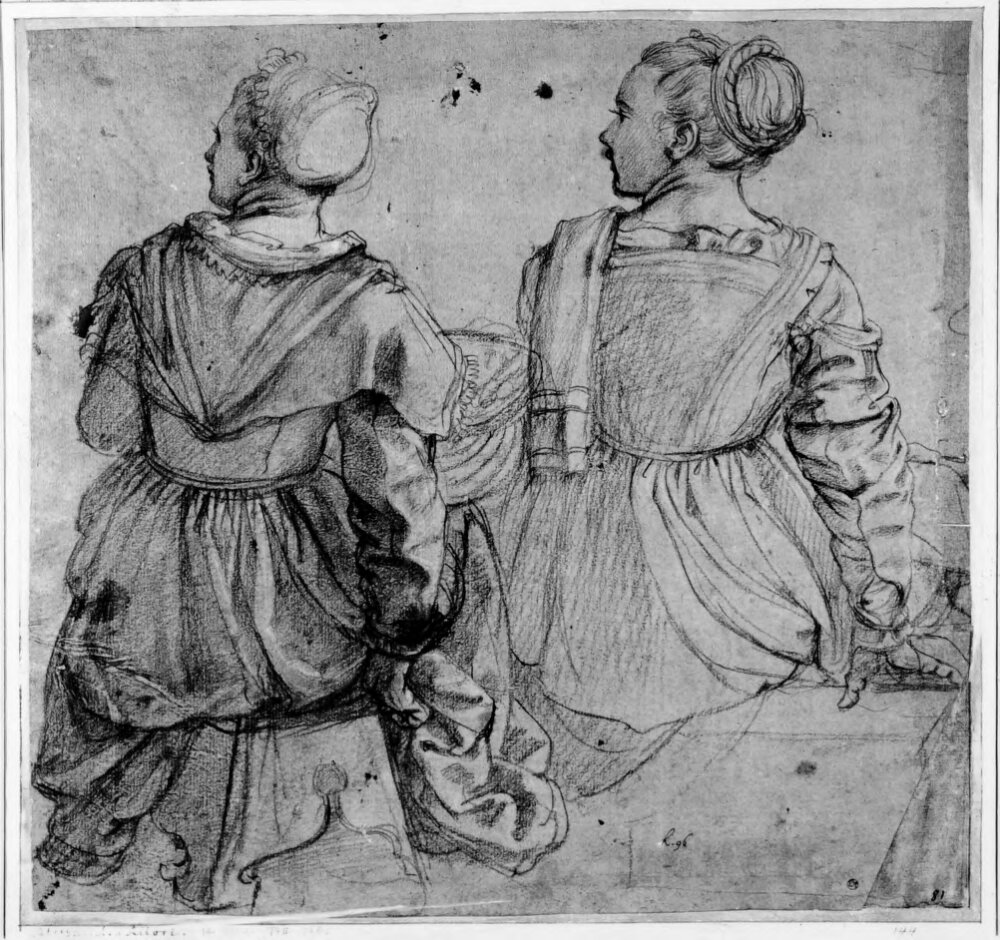
Study of Two Seated Girls

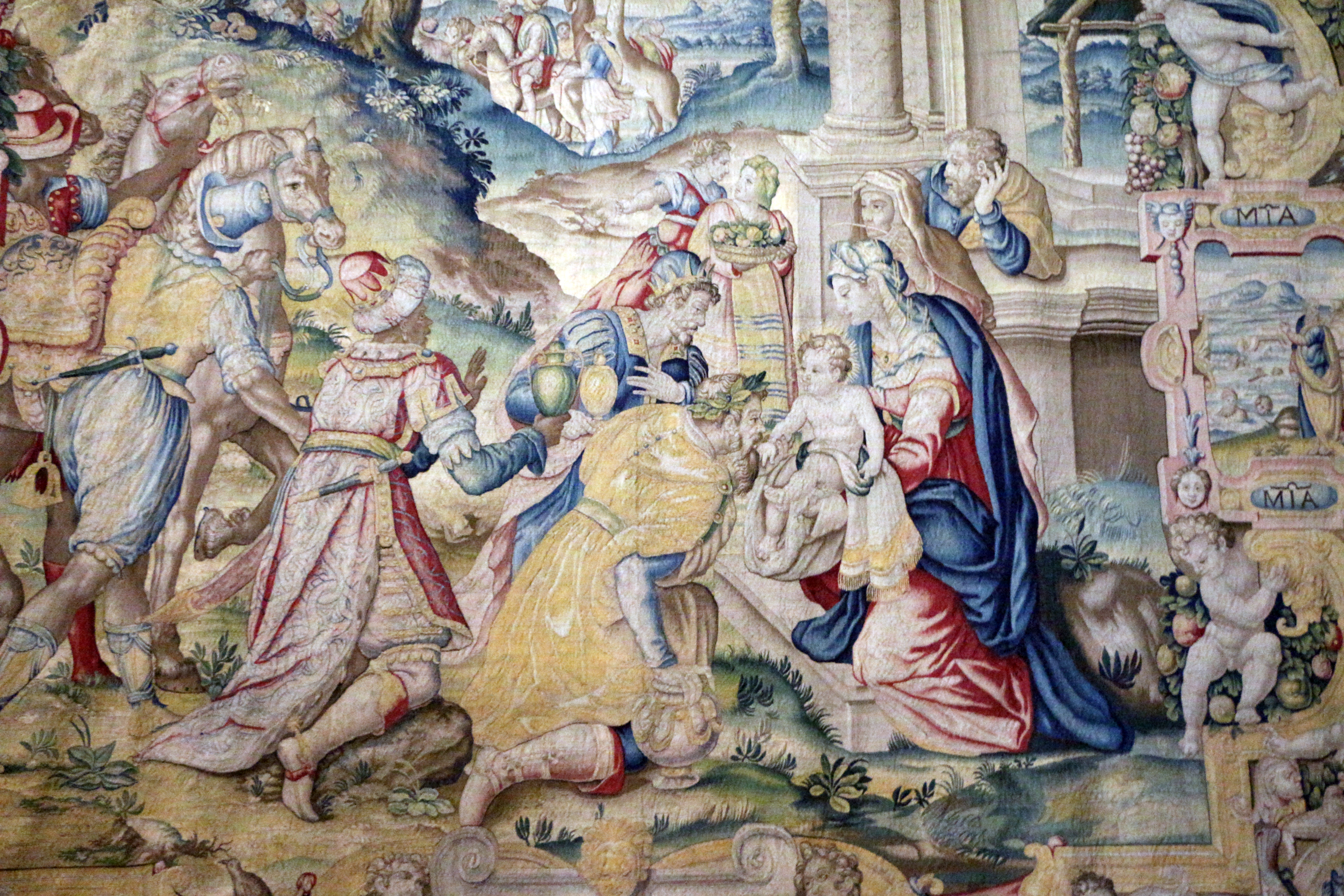
Adoration of the Magi, detail from a 1583 tapestry designed by Allori

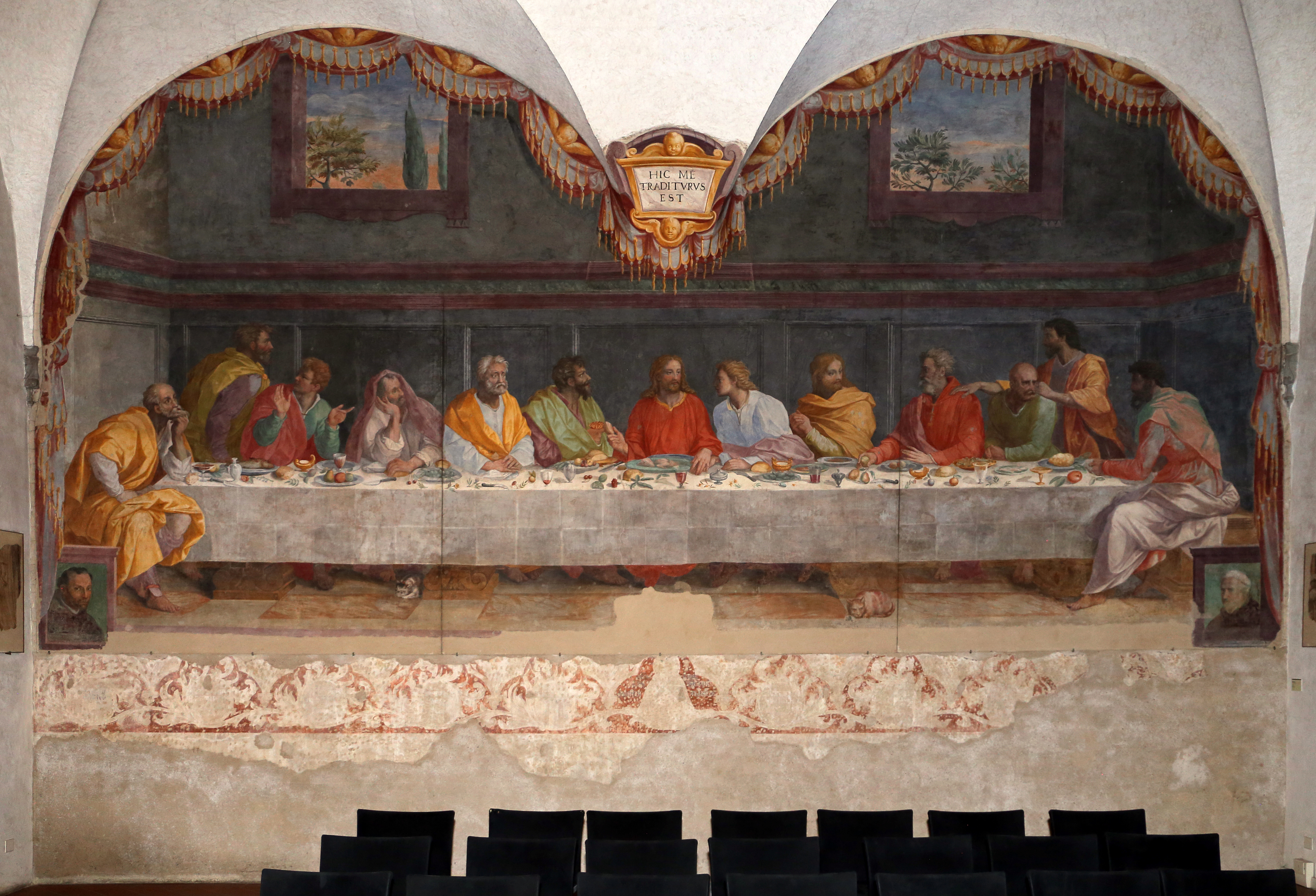
The Last Supper from the Cappella Brancacci in Chiesa di Santa Maria del Carmine, Florence, Italy, 1582

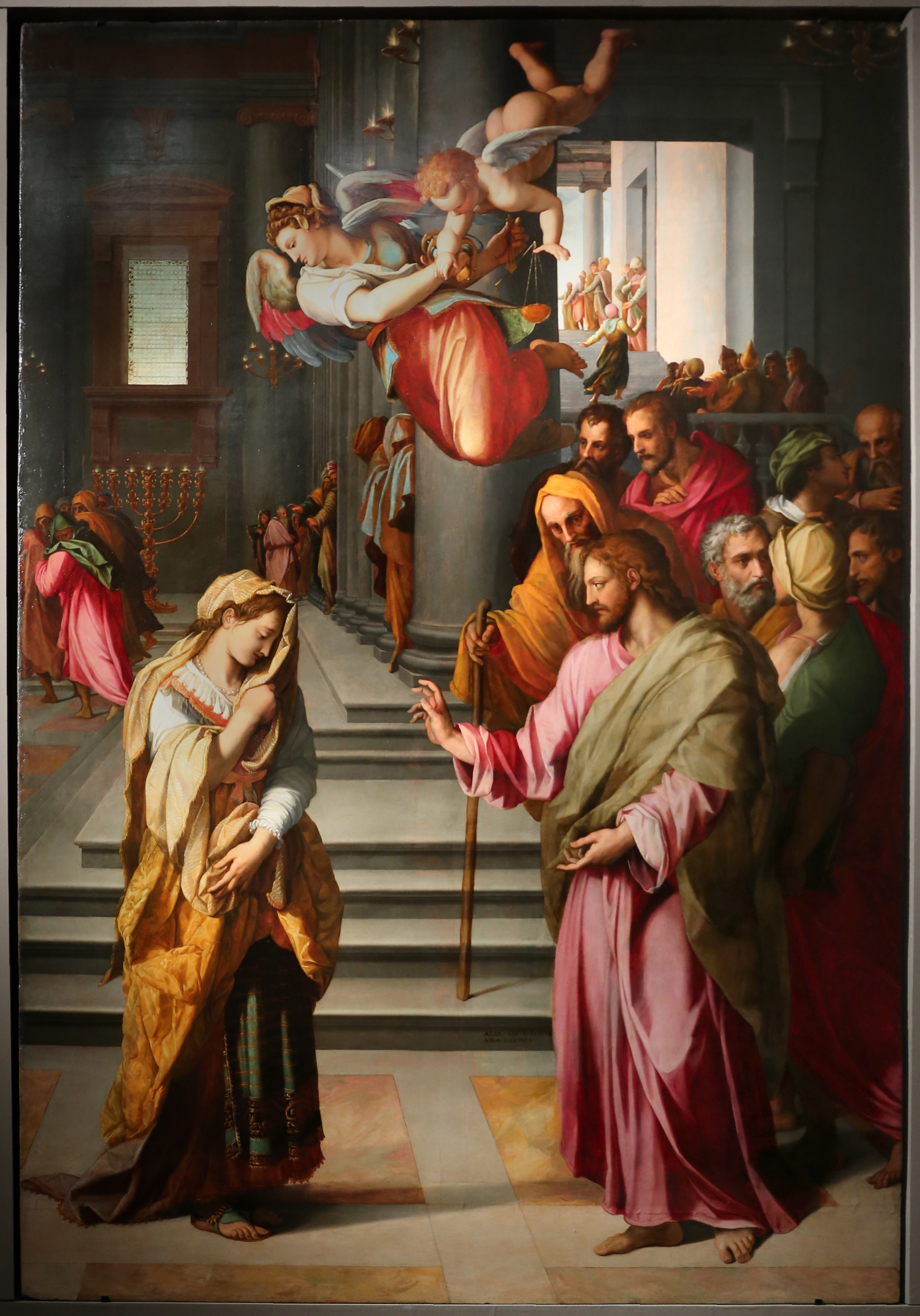
Christ and the Adultress by Alessandro Allori, 1577, from the Basilica di Santo Spirito, Florence, Italy

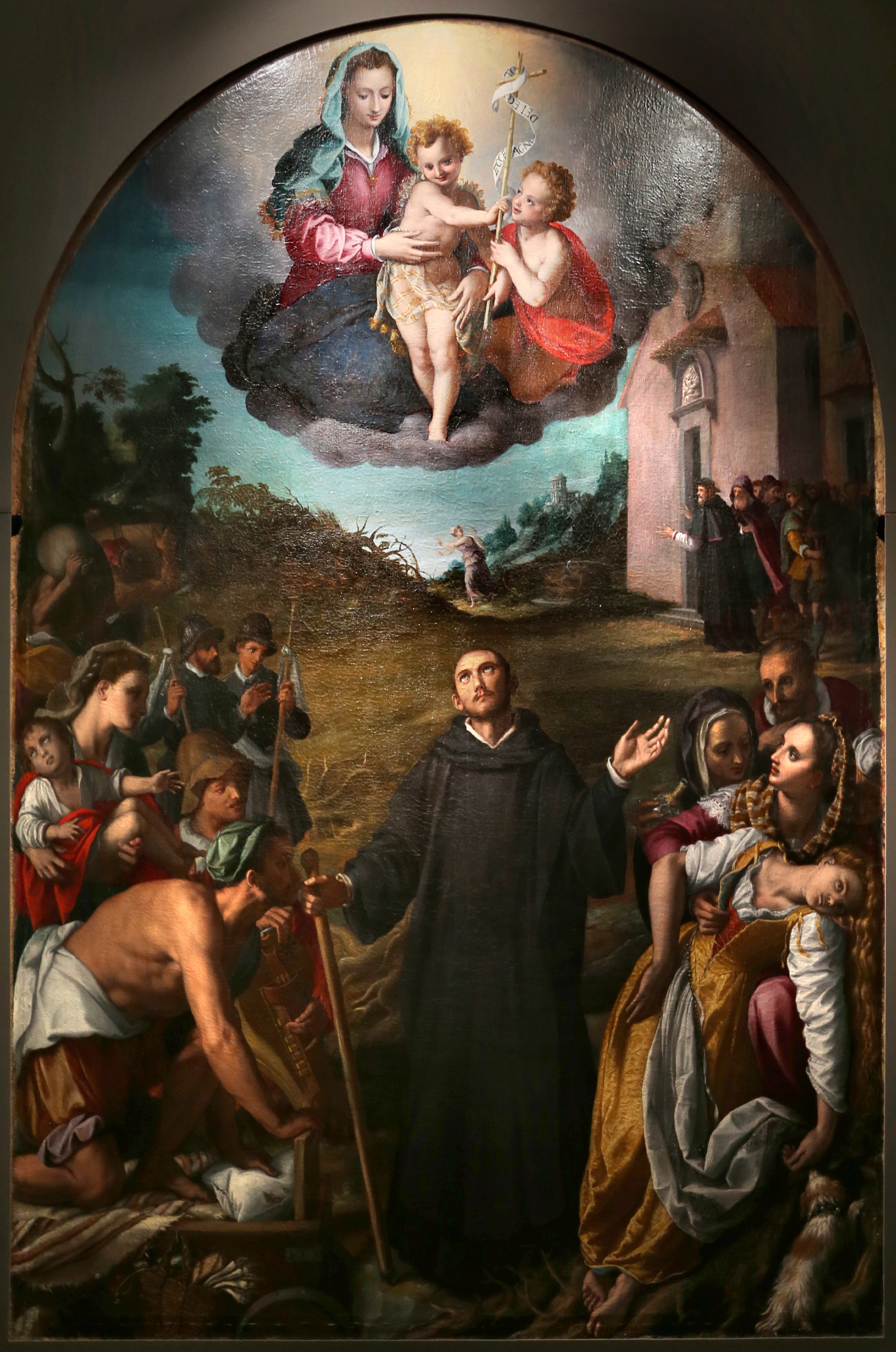
Miracles of Saint Fiacre by Alessandro Allori, circa 1596, from the Basilica di Santo Spirito, Florence, Italy
