= Antonio Piccinni =

Italian painter and engraver (1846–1920)

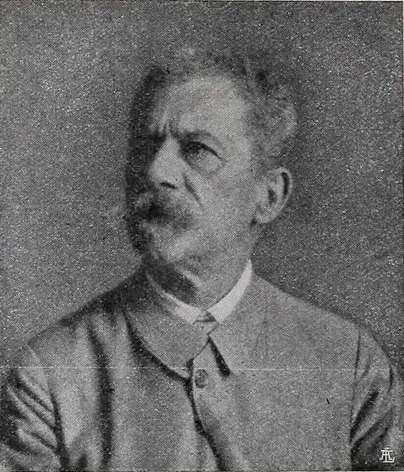
- Born: 14 May 1846; Trani
- Died: 26 January 1920 (aged 73); Rome
- Occupation: Painter, engraver, graphic artist

Antonio Piccinni (May 14, 1846 – January 26, 1920) was an Italian painter, mainly of watercolors. He was also an engraver, facile in the engraving of diverse subjects, from history, landscape, portrait, and sacred subjects.

== Biography ==
He was born in Trani in Apulia, but mainly resided in Naples and later Rome. As an infant, Piccinni was left nearly deaf by an illness. As a young man, he moved to Naples to work under the painter Biagio Molinaro, by the 1860s he had enrolled in the Institute of Fine Arts of Naples, and studied engraving. In 1872, he won a stipend to study in the Academy of Fine Arts in Rome. He still relayed engravings for sale by the Neapolitan "Società Promotrice delle Belle Arti", and maintained a contract with the Regia Calcografia (Royal Chalcography).

In 1877, the Regia Calcografia commissioned Piccinni to execute the preparatory drawing after Andrea del Sarto's Madonna of the Harpies, intended for translation into engraving. He completed the charcoal drawing in 1878; the sheet, measuring 668 × 488 mm and catalogued under inventory number D-CL45, is held by the Istituto Centrale per la Grafica. In 1884, the drawing was submitted to a competition for its translation into burin engraving. The competition was won by Francesco Di Bartolo, who completed the print in 1889.

In 1878 he participated in the Universal Exposition in Paris with several works including 12 unpublished etchings, gathered in an album titled "Souvenirs de Rome", with a preface by Jules Claretie. He was named Honorary Professor of the Institute of Fine Arts of Naples.

In 1877 at Naples, he exhibited an acquaforte engraving depicting: Revolution of Masaniello; in 1888 at Turin, Portraits of Vittorio Emanuele and King Umberto and I centesimi dell' avaro. At Rome, in 1883, he exhibited: A predica; at Venice, in 1887, a watercolor depicting: Un fiammiferaio; at Bologna, in 1888, two watercolors titled: The birichino and Una giovanetto.

Admiral G. B. Magnaghi, director of the Italian Hydrographic Institute of the Navy hired him in 1889 to produce vedute of the coast and nautical charts. He was offered a stable pension in a supervisory position, office in Rome, and travel on a ship, the Washington, to circumnavigate around the Italian coast. In 1904, after admiral Magnaghi died, Piccinni contract was not renewed, but he remained with the Navy until 1917. After 25 years of service, Piccinni was retired on a paltry pension.
