= Nativity of the Virgin (del Sarto) =

Painting by Andrea del Sarto

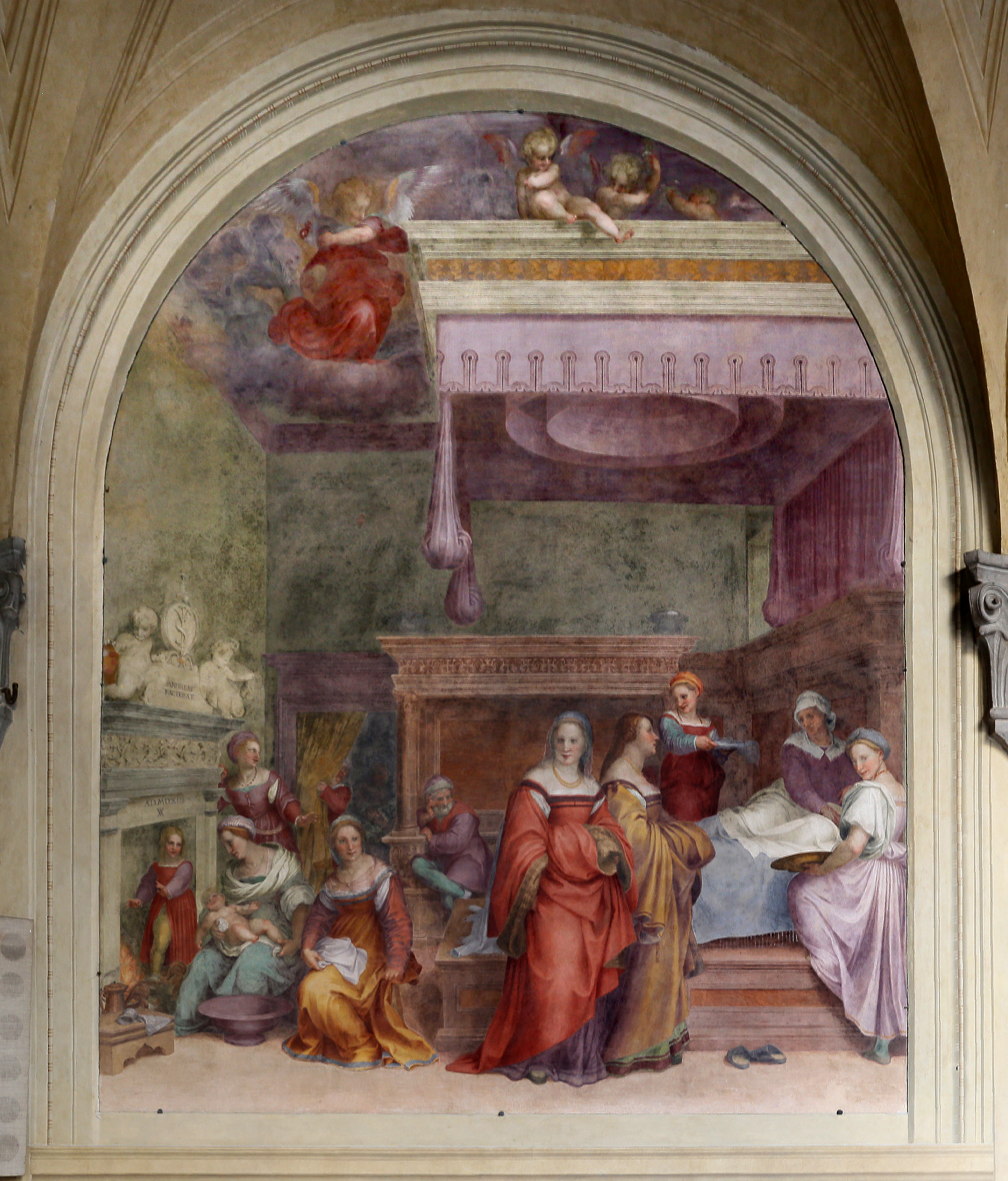
- Artist: Andrea del Sarto
- Year: 1513-1514
- Medium: Fresco
- Dimensions: 410 cm × 340 cm (160 in × 130 in)
- Location: Chiostro dei Voti, Santissima Annunziata, Florence

Nativity of the Virgin is a fresco painting by Andrea del Sarto in the Chiostro dei Voti of Santissima Annunziata in Florence. It is signed and dated in 1514, though most of the work on it is thought to have been carried out in 1513.

== History ==
A series of documents dating to 1511–1513 document progress on the work. From them, Shearman theorises that most of the painting took place in 1513. Andrea wished to leave after completing the frescoes of the life of Philip Benizi de Damiani on the opposite side of the atrium. However, the friar in charge of the frescoes, the sacristan fra Mariano dal Canto delle Macine, insisted that Andrea paint two further lunettes with scenes from the life of the Virgin Mary. Andrea agreed, only in return for an increased payment for the final frescoes.

Like the other frescoes in the series, the Nativity was detached from the wall, restored and replaced during the 1960s, which limited its damage from the Florence flood of 1966. The Gabinetto dei Disegni e delle Stampe of the Uffizi includes a late 16th century drawing of the fresco, attributed to Maso da San Friano (n. 6466).

== Description and style ==
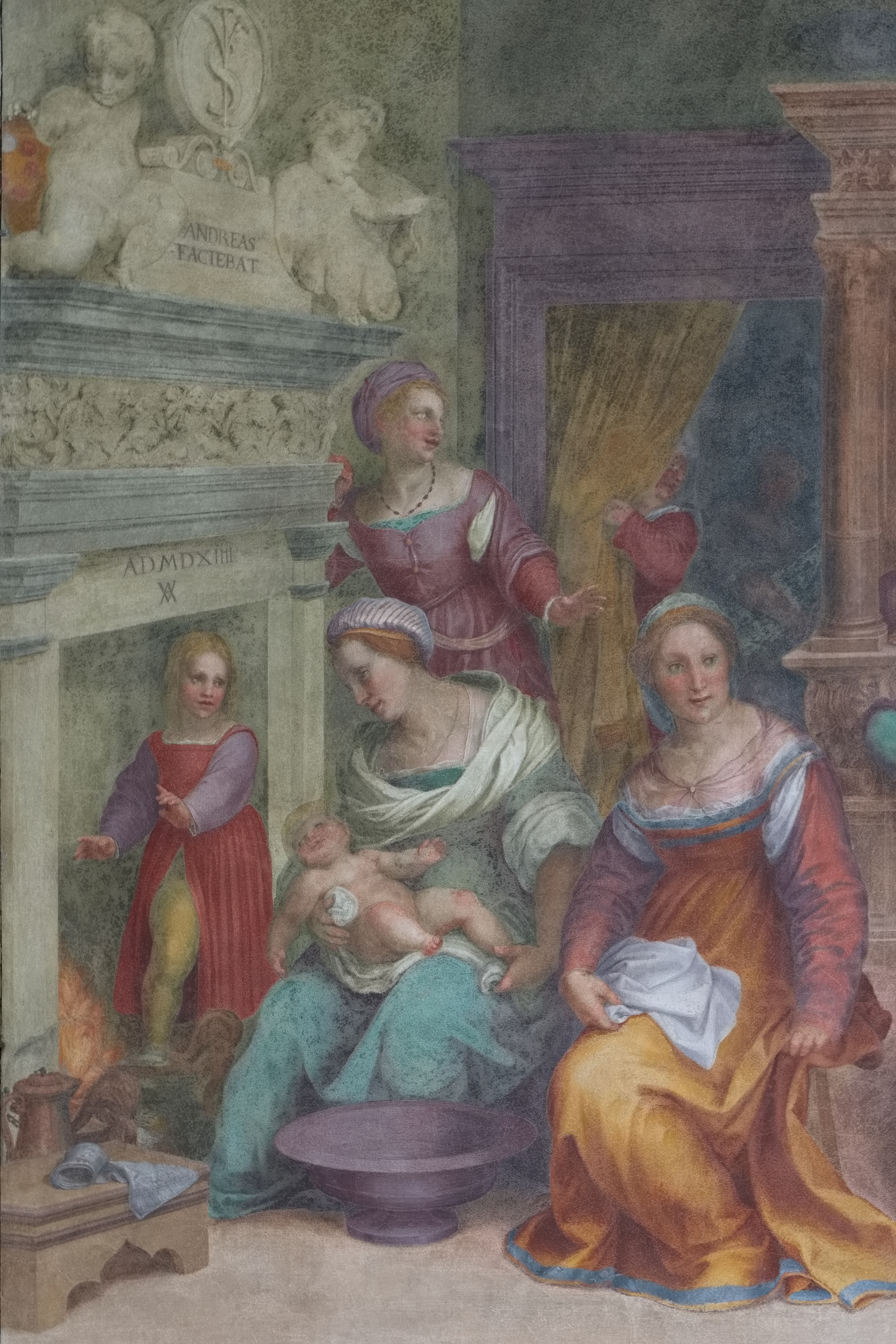
Birth of the Virgin, detail with signature and the Servite's coat of arms over the fireplace

The painting is derived, like the rest of the cycle, from a work of Domenico Ghirlandaio, the Natività di Maria of the Tornabuoni Chapel in Santa Maria Novella. The bed has a similar composition, with the people arranged around it, although del Sarto rotated the elements and added vertical components with the canopy and angels crowded around the scene. The richness of the poses, often linked to references, the balanced artificiality, the sumptuous clothes, the reduced palette of rare colors such as violets, made the Nativity a key work of the 16th century that was often studied by Mannerist painters.

Art historian Luciano Berti emphasized the work's "sustained, but warm, prose" and the monumental effect given by the canopied bed.

== Bibliography ==
- (in Italian) Eugenio Casalini, La SS. Annunziata di Firenze, Becocci Editore, Firenze 1980.
