= Madonna of the Harpies =

Altarpiece by Andrea del Sarto

- Madonna delle Arpie (Italian)
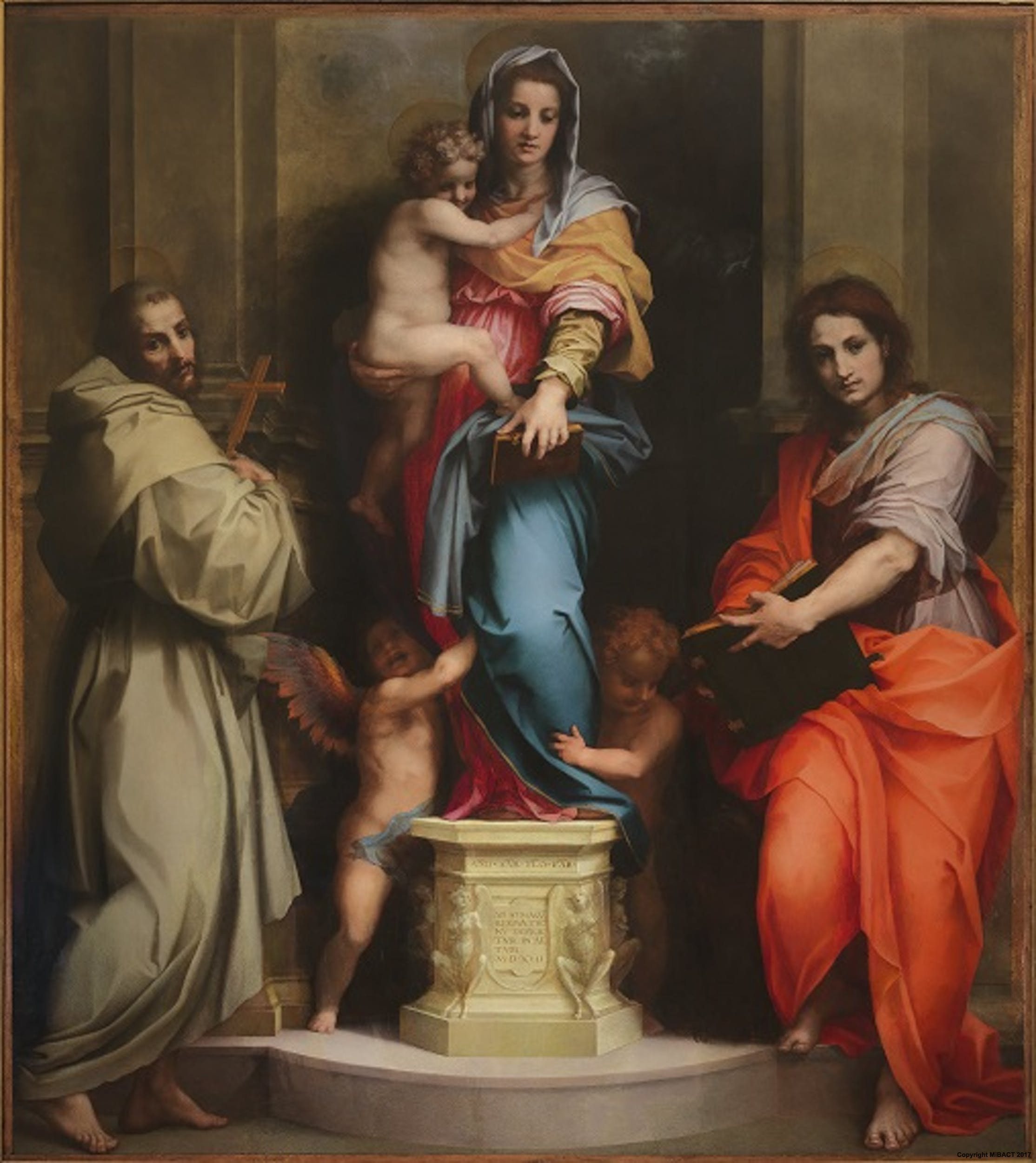
- Artist: Andrea del Sarto
- Year: 1517
- Type: oil on wood
- Dimensions: 208 cm × 178 cm (82 in × 70 in)
- Location: Galleria degli Uffizi, Florence

Madonna of the Harpies (Italian: Madonna delle Arpie) is an altarpiece in oils by Andrea del Sarto, a major painter of the High Renaissance. It was commissioned in 1515 and was signed and dated by the artist in 1517 in the inscription on the pedestal; it is now in the Uffizi in Florence. It was praised by Giorgio Vasari, and is arguably the artist's best-known work.

The Virgin is standing on a pedestal which includes harpies sculpted in relief, from which the painting takes its name. At least, Vasari (and presumably his Florentine contemporaries) thought they were harpies; some modern art historians think that locusts are represented, in a reference to the Book of Revelation. Either way, they represent forces of evil being trampled on by the Virgin.

It is a sacra conversazione showing the Virgin and Child flanked by putti and two saints (Saint Bonaventure or Francis and John the Evangelist). Compared to the stillness of earlier paintings of similar groups, here the "dynamism of the High Renaissance was inimical to the static quality of 15th-century art", so that "a composition of fundamentally classical purity is animated by a nervous energy in the figures to produce an unsettling impression of variety."

It was completed in 1517 for the church of the convent and hospital of San Francesco dei Macci in Florence; this was run by the Poor Clares and is long closed, but the church building survives. The figures have a Leonardo-like aura, with a pyramid-shaped composition.

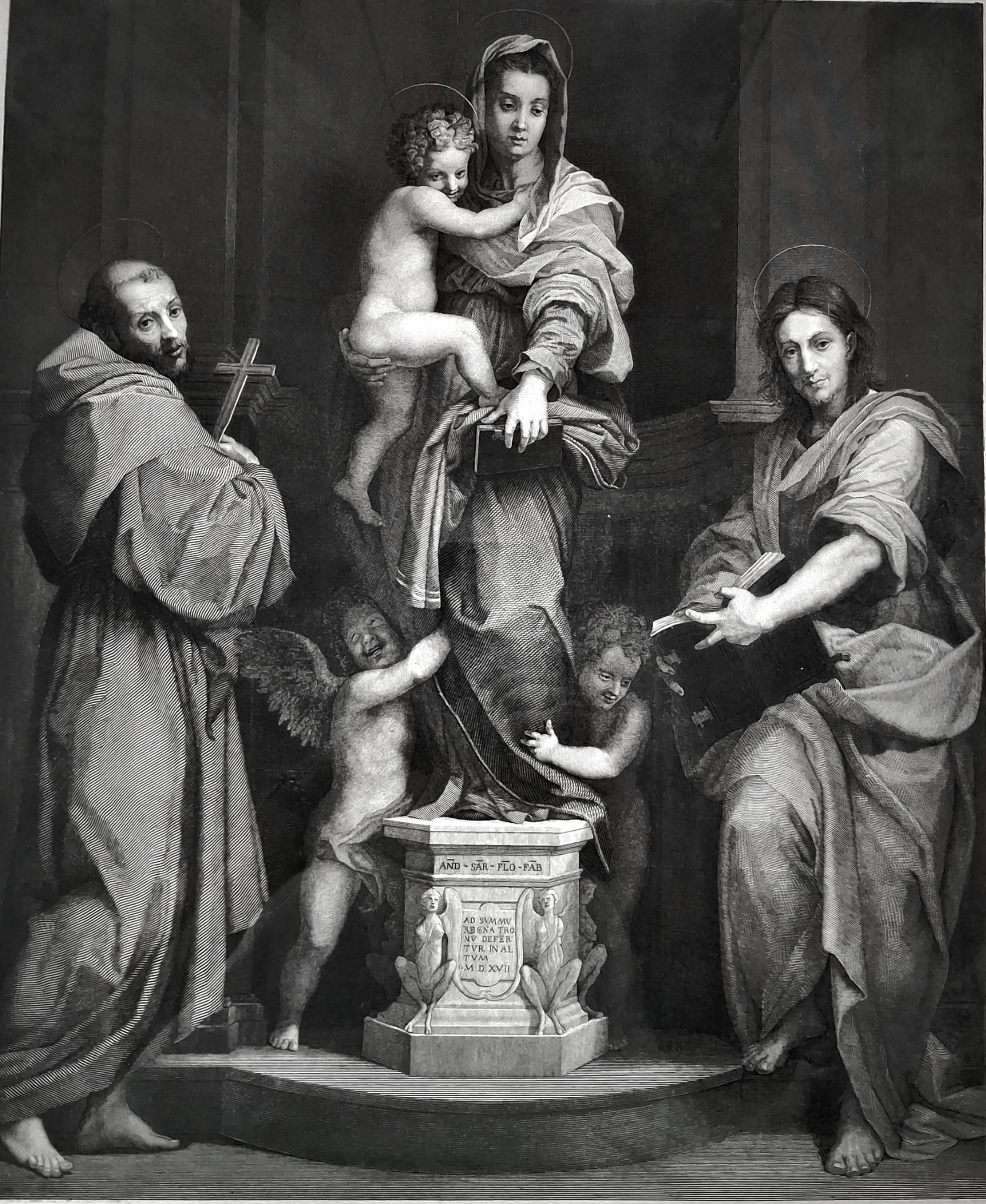
Francesco Di Bartolo, Madonna of the Harpies, after Andrea del Sarto, burin engraving, 1889, Natalia Di Bartolo Collection

The harpies, figures from pagan mythology (or locusts), here represent temptation and sin, which the Virgin has conquered and stands upon. The Christ child is shown as unusually old, and has an athletic contrapposto pose. He looks down to the putti, and all three have a "mischiefness" that contrasts with the serious, abstracted, air of the adults.

In the nineteenth century, the altarpiece was translated into print. Antonio Piccinni produced the preparatory drawing, and Francesco Di Bartolo, winner of the competition announced by the Regia Calcografia in 1884, engraved it with the burin. The print was published in 1889.

A main character in Kürk Mantolu Madonna ('Madonna in a Fur Coat'), a novel by the Turkish writer Sabahattin Ali, is compared to the figure of the Virgin Mary in the Madonna of the Harpies.
