= Andrea del Sarto =

Italian painter (1486–1530)

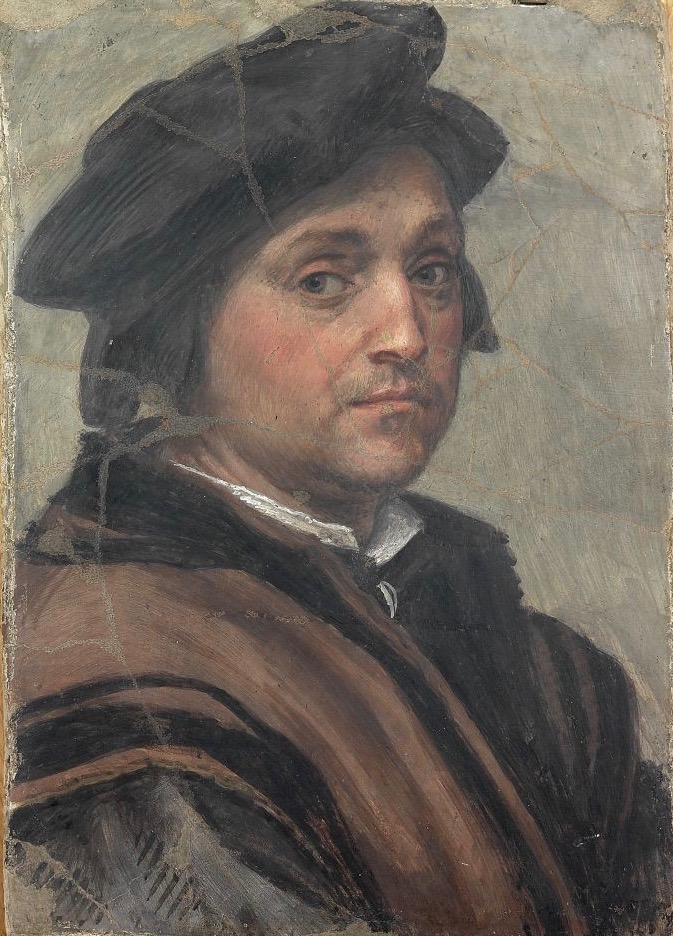
- Self-Portrait, 1528, Uffizi, Florence
- Born: Andrea d'Agnolo di Francesco di Luca; 16 July 1486; Florence, Republic of Florence (present-day Italy)
- Died: before 29 September 1530 (aged 44); Florence, Republic of Florence (present-day Italy)
- Known for: Painting
- Notable work: Madonna of the Harpies; Nativity of the Virgin
- Movement: High Renaissance; Mannerism

Andrea del Sarto (US: /ɑːnˌdreɪə dɛl ˈsɑːrtoʊ/, UK: /ænˌ-/, Italian: [anˈdrɛːa del ˈsarto]; 16 July 1486 – 29 September 1530) was an Italian painter from Florence, whose career flourished during the High Renaissance and early Mannerism. He was known as an outstanding fresco decorator, painter of altarpieces, portraitist, draughtsman, and colorist. Although highly regarded during his lifetime as an artist senza errori ("without errors"), his renown was eclipsed after his death by that of his contemporaries Leonardo da Vinci, Michelangelo and Raphael.

== Early life and training ==
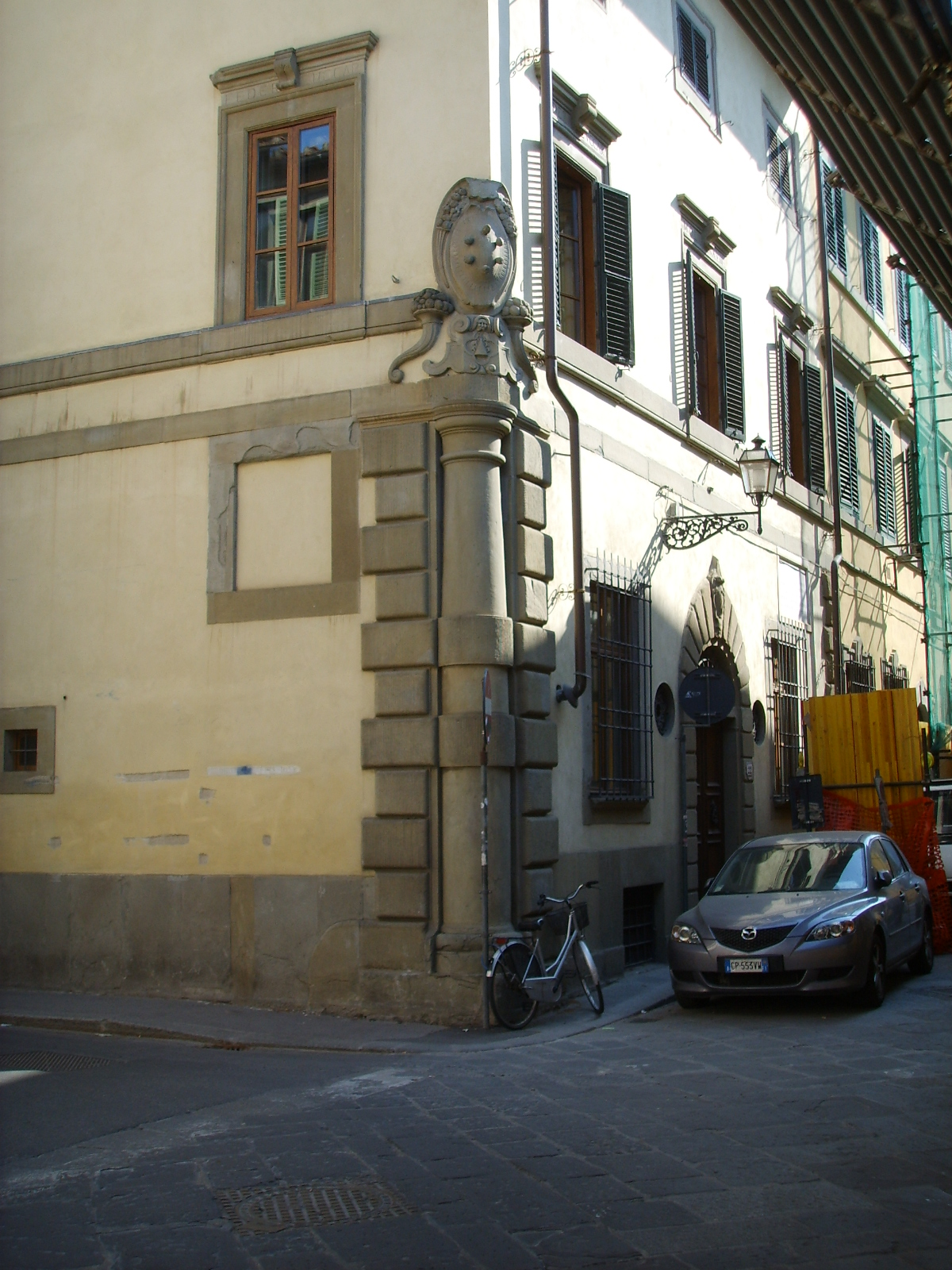
The house of Andrea del Sarto

Andrea del Sarto was born Andrea d'Agnolo di Francesco di Luca in Florence on 16 July 1486. Since his father, Agnolo, was a tailor (Italian: sarto), he became known as "del Sarto" (meaning "tailor's son"). Since 1677 some have attributed the surname Vannucchi with little documentation.

By 1494, Andrea was apprenticed to a goldsmith, and then to a woodcarver and painter named Gian Barile, with whom he remained until 1498. According to his late biographer Vasari, he then apprenticed to Piero di Cosimo, and later with Raffaellino del Garbo (Carli).

Andrea and an older friend, Franciabigio, decided to open a joint studio at a lodging together in the Piazza del Grano. The first product of their partnership may have been the Baptism of Christ for the Florentine Compagnia dello Scalzo, the beginning of a monochrome fresco series. By the time the partnership was dissolved, Sarto's style bore the stamp of individuality. According to the Encyclopædia Britannica, it "is marked throughout his career by an interest, exceptional among Florentines, in effects of colour and atmosphere and by sophisticated informality and natural expression of emotion".

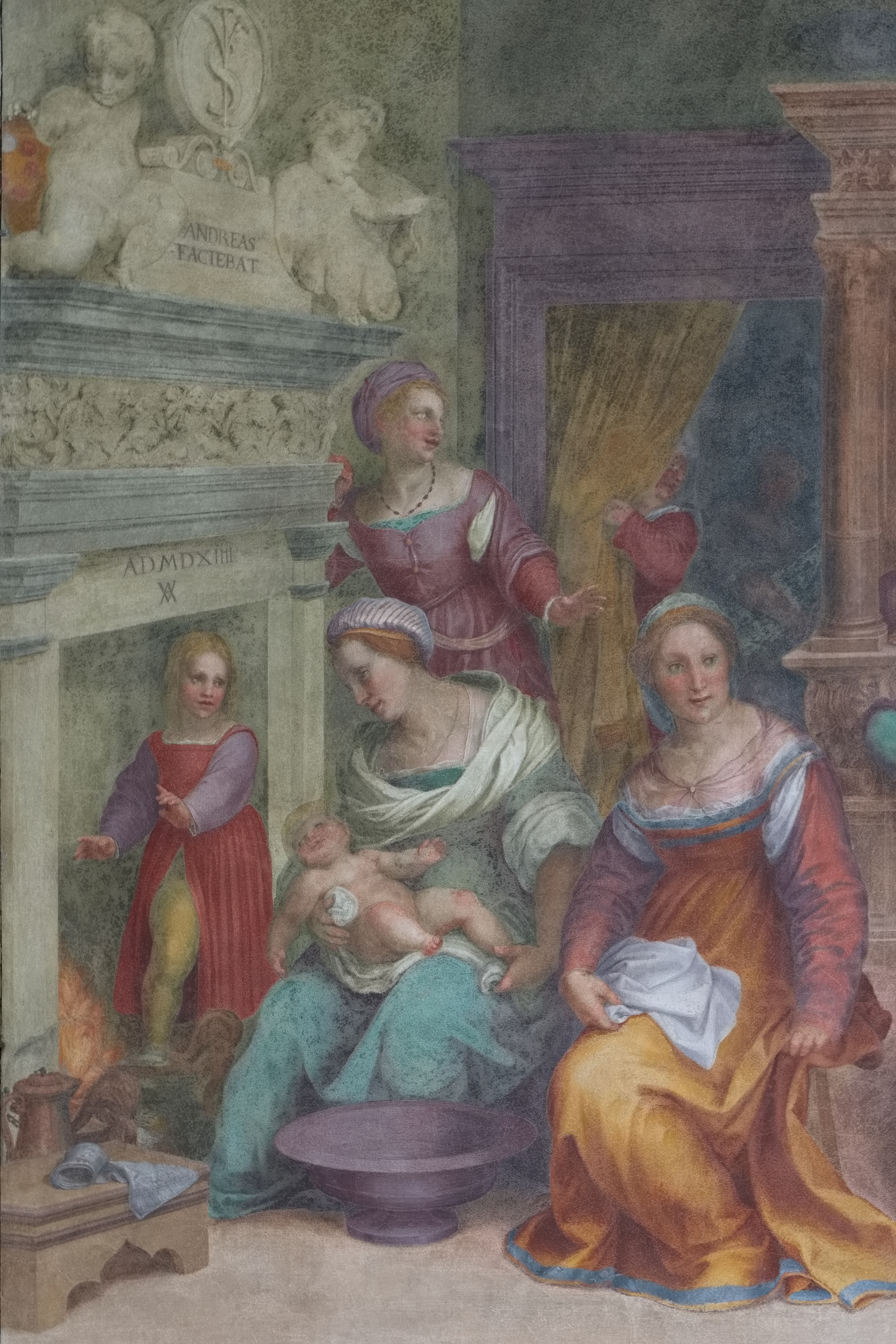
Birth of the Virgin (detail), 1509–10, SS Annunziata, Chiostrino dei Voti, Florence

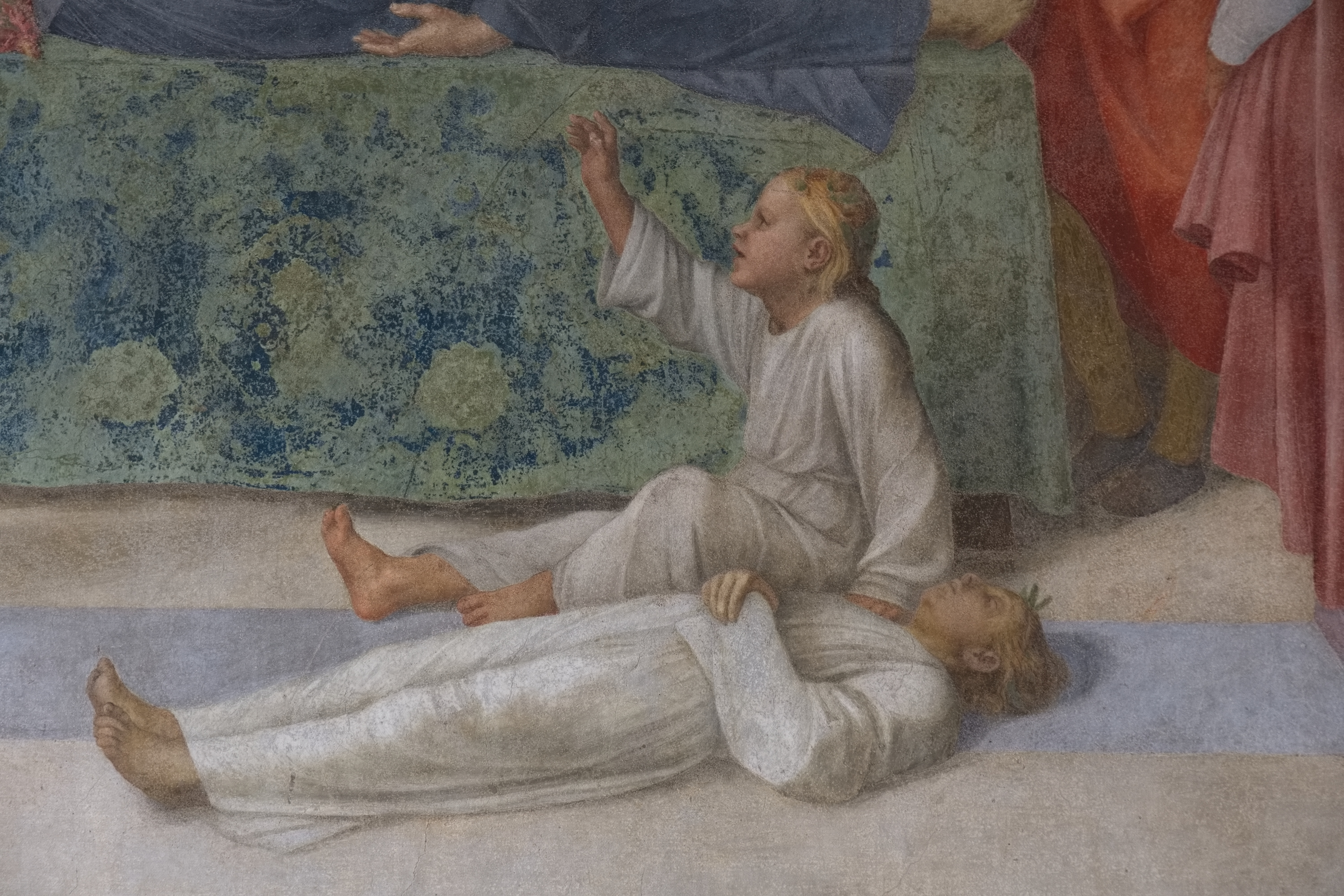
S Filippo Benizi's Death and Child restored to Life (detail), 1509–10, SS Annunziata, Chiostrino dei Voti

== Frescoes at SS Annunziata in Florence ==
From 1509 to 1514 the Servite Order employed Del Sarto, Franciabigio, and Andrea Feltrini in a programme of frescoes at Basilica della Santissima Annunziata di Firenze. Sarto completed seven frescoes in the forecourt or atrium (the chiostro dei voti) before the Servite church, five of which illustrated the Life and miracles of Filippo Benizzi, a Servite saint who died in 1285 (canonized 1671). He executed them rapidly, depicting the saint healing a leper through the gift of his undertunic; predicting the bad end of some blasphemers; and restoring a girl possessed with a devil. The two final frescoes of the series depicted the healing of a child at the death bed of Filippo Benizzi and the curing of sick adults and children through his relic garment held at the church. All five frescoes were completed before the close of 1510. The original contract also required him to paint five scenes of the life and miracles of Saint Sebastian, but he told the Servites that he no longer wished to continue with the second cycle, most likely due to the low remuneration. The Servites convinced him to do two more frescoes in the forecourt, although of a different subject matter: a Procession of the Magi (containing a self-portrait) finished in 1511 and a Nativity of the Virgin (1514), which fuses the influence of Leonardo, Ghirlandaio, and Fra Bartolomeo. These paintings met with respect, the correctness of the contours being particularly admired, and earned for Sarto the nickname of Andrea senza errori ("Andrea without fault"). Toward 1512 he painted an Annunciation in the Church of San Gallo and a Marriage of Saint Catherine (today in Dresden).

By November 1515 he had finished at the nearby Chiostro of the Confraternity of Saint John the Baptist (commonly known as the Scalzo) the Allegory of Justice and the Baptist Preaching in the Desert, followed in 1517 by John Baptizing the People.

== Visit to France ==
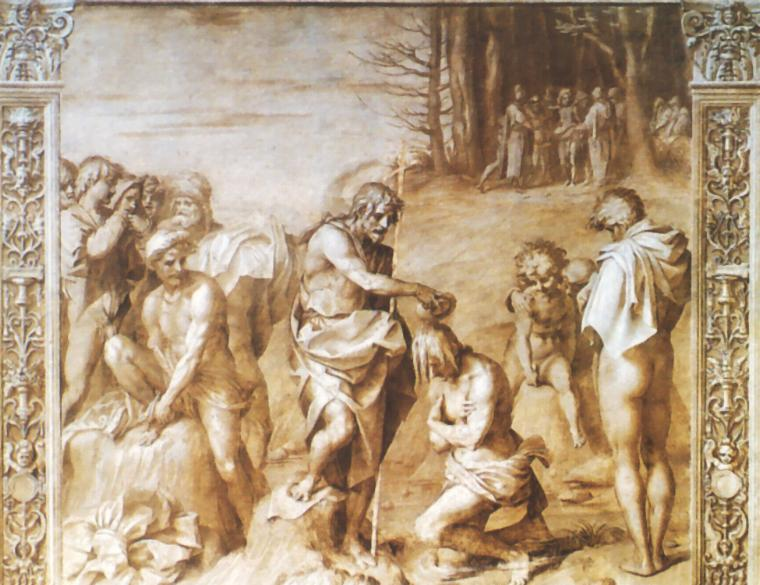
Del Sarto's most ambitious monument, in terms of the amount of time he devoted to it, is the grisaille series in the Chiostro dello Scalzo.

Before the end of 1516, a Pietà of Del Sarto's composition, and afterward a Madonna, were sent to the French Court. This led to an invitation from François I, in 1518, and he journeyed to Paris in June of that year, along with his pupil Andrea Squarzzella, leaving his wife, Lucrezia, in Florence.

According to Giorgio Vasari, Andrea's pupil and biographer, Lucrezia wrote to Andrea and demanded he return to Italy. The king assented, but only on the understanding that his absence from France was to be short. He then entrusted Andrea with a sum of money to be expended in purchasing works of art for the French Court. By Vasari's account, Andrea took the money and used it instead to buy a house in Florence, thus ruining his reputation and preventing him from ever returning to France. The story inspired Robert Browning's poem-monologue "Andrea del Sarto Called the 'Faultless Painter'" (1855), but now is dismissed by some historians as apocryphal, untrue although oft-repeated.

== Later works in Florence ==
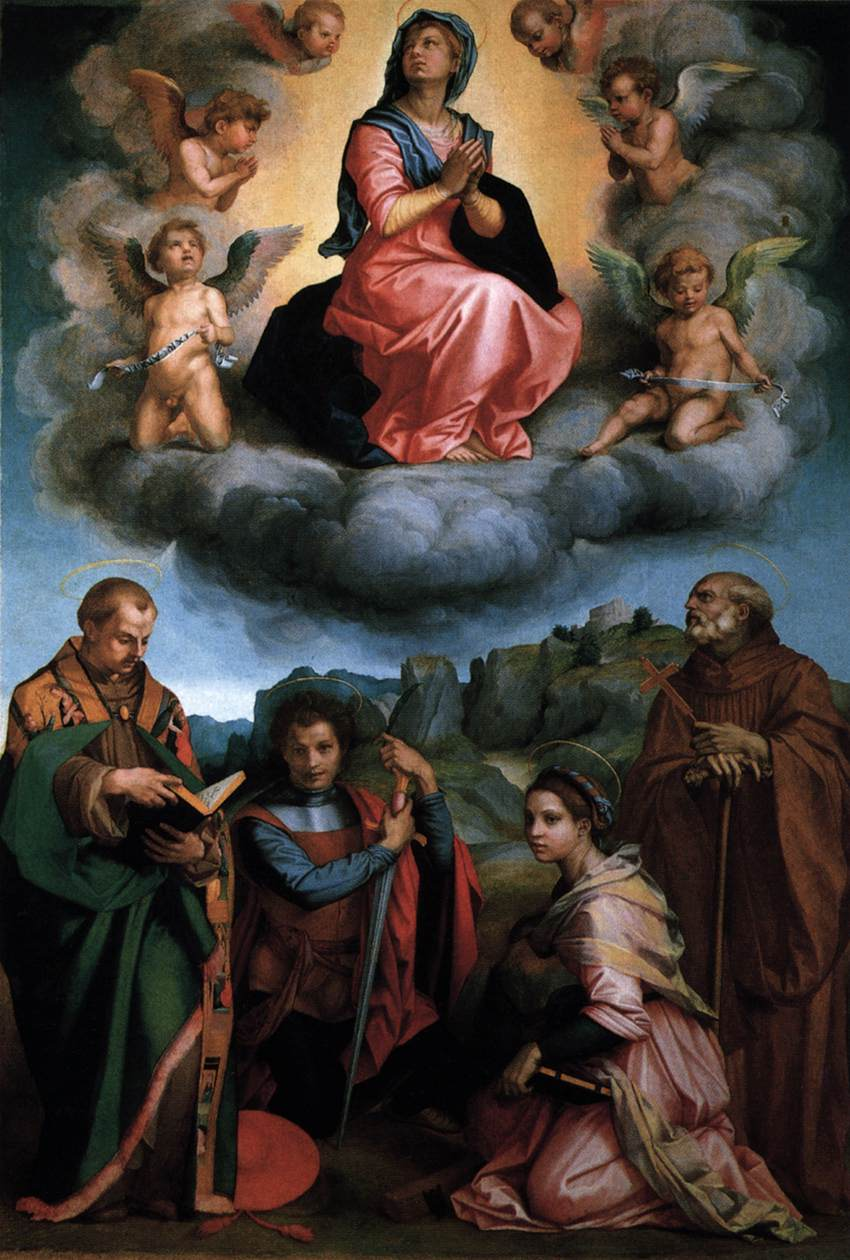
Assumption of the Virgin (Poppi Altarpiece), 1530

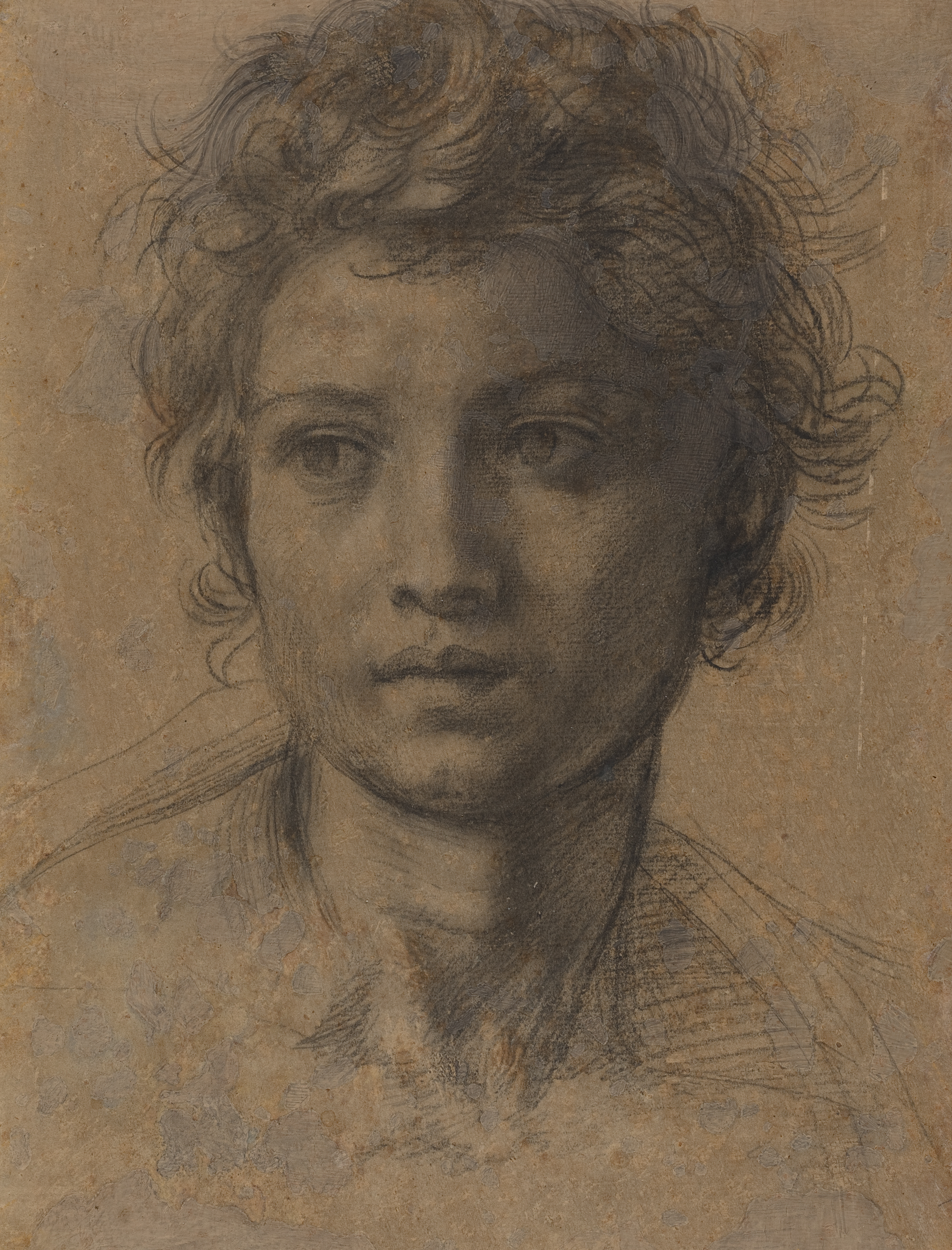
Head of Saint John the Baptist, c. 1523, National Gallery of Art

He resumed work in Florence during 1520 and executed the Faith and Charity in the cloister of the Scalzo. These were succeeded by the Dance of the Daughter of Herodias, the Beheading of the Baptist, the Presentation of His Head to Herod, an Allegory of Hope, the Apparition of the Angel to Zacharias (1523) and the monochrome Visitation. This last was painted in the autumn of 1524, after Andrea had returned from Luco in Mugello, whence an outbreak of bubonic plague in Florence had driven him and his family. In 1525, he returned to paint in the Annunziata cloister the Madonna del Sacco, a lunette named after a sack against which Joseph is represented propped. In this painting the generous virgin's gown and her gaze indicate his influence on the early style of pupil Pontormo.

In 1523, Andrea painted a copy of the portrait group of Pope Leo X by Raphael; this copy is now in the Museo di Capodimonte in Naples, while the original remains at the Pitti Palace. The Raphael painting was owned by Ottaviano de' Medici, and requested by Federico II Gonzaga, Duke of Mantua. Unwilling to part with the original, Ottaviano retained Andrea to produce a copy, which he passed to the Duke as the original. The imitation was so faithful that even Giulio Romano, who had himself manipulated the original to some extent, was completely fooled; and, on showing the copy years afterwards to Vasari, who knew the truth, he could be convinced that it was not genuine only when a private mark on the canvas was pointed out to him by Vasari.

Andrea's final work at the Scalzo was the Nativity of the Baptist (1526). In the following year he completed his last important painting, a Last Supper at San Salvi (now an inner suburb of Florence), in which all the characters appear to be portraits. The church is now the Museo del Cenacolo di Andrea del Sarto.

A number of his paintings were considered to be self-portraits. Formerly, a Portrait of a Young Man in the National Gallery, London was believed to be a self-portrait, as was the Portrait of Becuccio Bicchieraio in National Gallery of Scotland, but now both are known not to be self-portraits. There is a self-portrait at Alnwick Castle, a young man about twenty years of age with his elbow on a table. Another youthful portrait is in the Uffizi Gallery and the Pitti Palace contains more than one.

=== Madonna of the Harpies ===
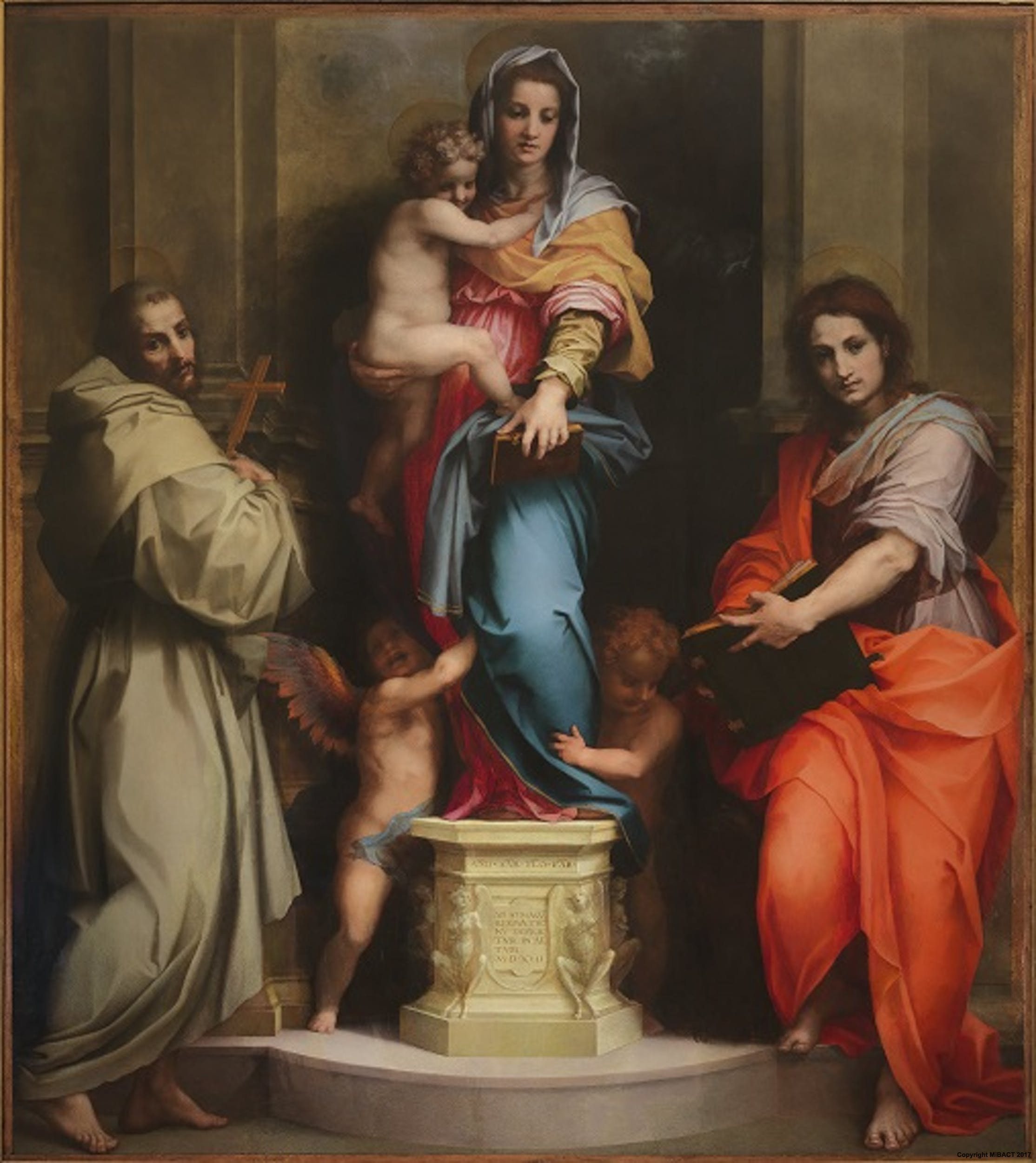
The Madonna of the Harpies, 1517

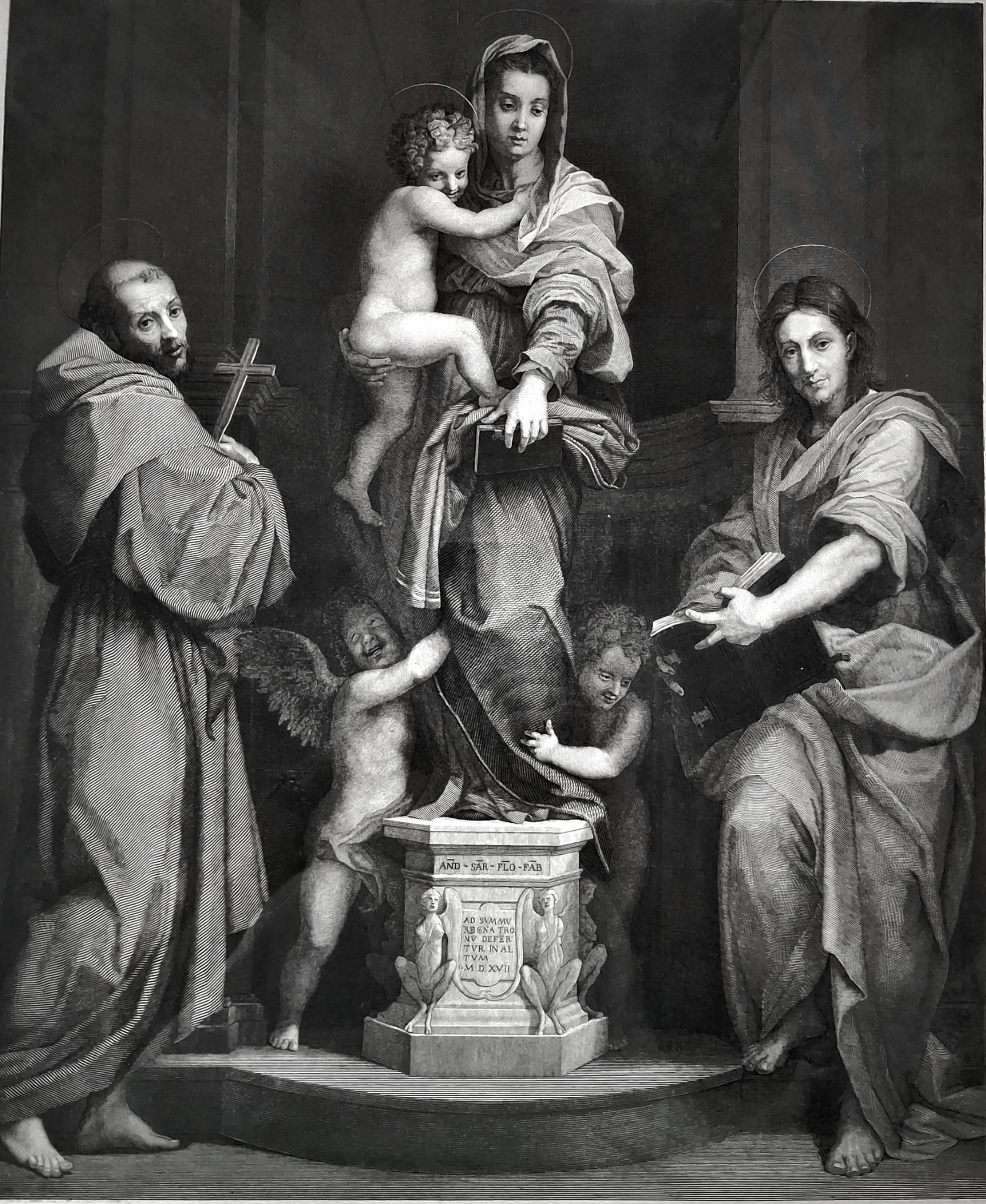
Francesco Di Bartolo, Madonna of the Harpies, after Andrea del Sarto, burin engraving, 1889, Natalia Di Bartolo Collection

The Madonna of the Harpies is a depiction of the Virgin and Child on a pedestal, flanked by two saints (Bonaventure or Francis and John the Evangelist), and at her feet, two cherubs. The pedestal is decorated with a relief depicting some feminine figures interpreted as harpies and thus gave rise, in English, to the name of the painting. Originally completed in 1517 for the convent of San Francesco dei Macci, the altarpiece now resides in the Uffizi. In an Italy crowded with Madonnas, it would be easy to overlook this work; however, this commonly copied scheme also lends itself to comparison of his style with that of his contemporaries. The figures have a Leonardo-like aura, and the stable pyramid of their composition provides a unified structure. In some ways, his rigid adherence is more classical than Leonardo's but less so than Fra Bartolomeo's representations of the Holy Family.

The altarpiece later entered the repertory of nineteenth-century reproductive engraving. Antonio Piccinni completed a preparatory drawing after it in 1878; following a competition held by the Regia Calcografia in 1884, Francesco Di Bartolo translated Piccinni's drawing into a burin engraving, published in 1889. The print reinterprets the monumental structure and tonal values of Andrea del Sarto's painting through the engraved treatment of flesh, drapery and architectural space.

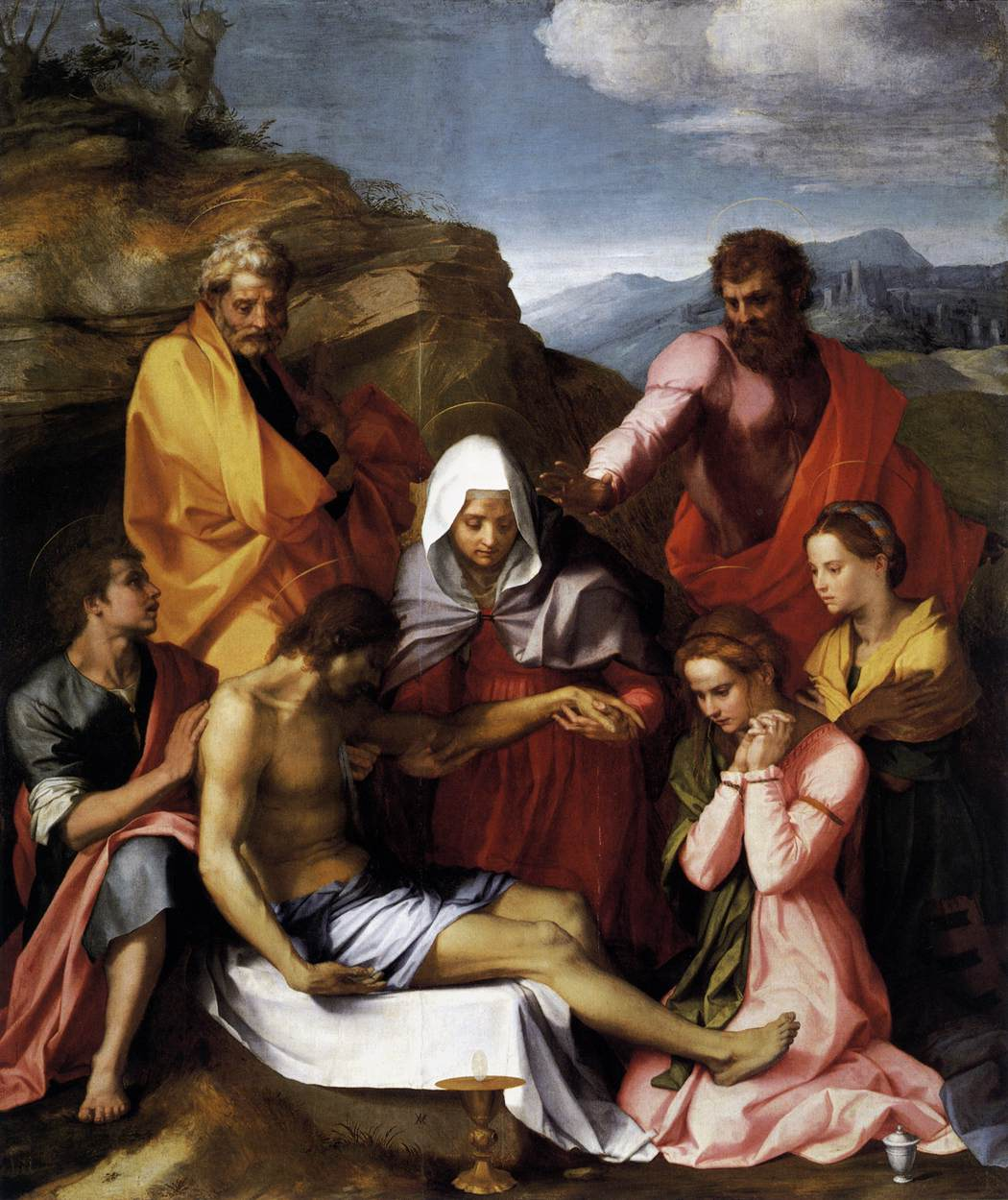
Pietà with Saints, 1523–24

== Personal life ==
Andrea married Lucrezia (del Fede), the widow of a hatter named Carlo, of Recanati, on 26 December 1512. Lucrezia appears in many of his paintings, often as a Madonna. Giorgio Vasari (1511–1574) describes her as "faithless, jealous, and vixenish with the apprentices". In Robert Browning's poem this characterisation is adapted.

Andrea died in Florence at age 44 during an outbreak of Bubonic Plague at the end of September 1530. He was buried unceremoniously by the Misericordia in the church of the Servites. In Lives of the Artists, Vasari claimed Andrea received no attention at all from his wife during his terminal illness. However, it was well known at the time that plague was highly contagious, so it has been speculated that Lucrezia might have been afraid of contracting the virulent and frequently-fatal disease. If true, this well-founded caution was rewarded, as she survived her husband by 40 years.

== Critical assessment and legacy ==
Said to have thought very highly of Andrea's talents, Michelangelo introduced thirteen-year-old Vasari to Andrea's studio in 1524. Of those who initially followed Andrea's style in Florence, the most prominent would be Jacopo Pontormo, along with Rosso Fiorentino, Francesco Salviati, and Jacopino del Conte. Other lesser known assistants and pupils include Bernardo del Buda, Lamberto Lombardi, Nannuccio Fiorentino, and Andrea Squazzella. Vasari, however, was highly critical of his teacher, alleging that, although having all the prerequisites of a great artist, he lacked ambition and a divine fire of inspiration that animated the works of his more famous contemporaries: Leonardo da Vinci, Michelangelo, and Raphael.

On 21 November 1848, the play Andre del Sarto, by Alfred de Musset, premiered in Paris.

In 1968, the opera Andrea del Sarto by French composer Jean-Yves Daniel-Lesur was based on Alfred de Musset's 1848 play.

== Selected works ==
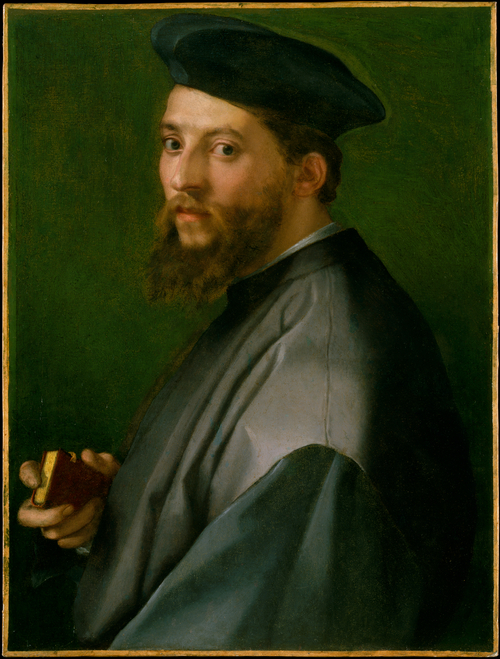
Portrait of a Man, Metropolitan Museum of Art, New York

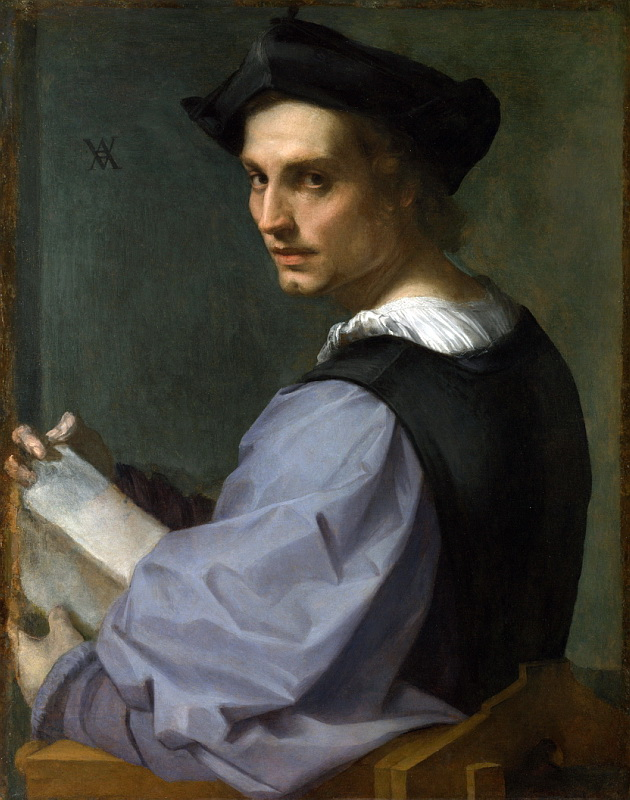
The so-called Portrait of a Sculptor, long believed to have been Del Sarto's self-portrait; National Gallery, London

- Holy Family with Saint Peter Martyr, 1507–1508, Pinacoteca di Bari
- Noli me tangere, c. 1510, Museo del Cenacolo di Andrea del Sarto, Florence
- Virgin and Child with Saints Elizabeth and John the Baptist, c. 1513, National Gallery, London
- Portrait of the Artist's Wife, 1513–1514, Museo del Prado, Madrid
- Nativity of the Virgin, 1513–1514, Santissima Annunziata, Florence
- Madonna of the Harpies (Virgin and Child with Saints Francis and John the Evangelist, and Two Angels), 1517, painted at San Francesco, now in the Uffizi, Florence
- Portrait of a Young Man, 1517–1518, National Gallery, London)
- Charity, 1518, Louvre, Paris
- Julius Caesar Receives Tribute, c. 1520, fresco at Poggio a Caiano, completed by Alessandro Allori
- The Virgin Surrounded by Saints, Pitti Palace, Florence
- Madonna della Scala, c. 1522–1523, Museo del Prado, Madrid
- Panciatichi Assumption, c. 1522–1523, Galleria Palatina, Pitti Palace, Florence
- Pietà, 1523–1524, Galleria Palatina, Pitti Palace, Florence
- Passerini Assumption, 1526, Galleria Palatina, Pitti Palace, Florence
- Last Supper, 1511–1527, Museo del Cenacolo di Andrea del Sarto, Florence
- The Disputation on the Trinity, c. 1528, altarpiece for the Church of San Gallo, now in the Uffizi, Florence
- Gambassi Altarpiece, c. 1528, Galleria Palatina, Pitti Palace, Florence
- Barberini Holy Family, c. 1528, Galleria Nazionale di Arte Antica, Palazzo Barberini, Rome
- Saint James with Two Youths, c. 1528–1529, Uffizi, Florence
- Vallombrosa Polyptych, c. 1528–1529, Uffizi, Florence
- Holy Family with John the Baptist, c. 1529, Hermitage, Saint Petersburg
- Borgherini Holy Family, c. 1529, Metropolitan Museum, New York
- Medici Holy Family, c. 1529, Galleria Palatina, Palazzo Pitti, Florence
- Madonna in Glory with Four Saints, 1530, Galleria Palatina, Palazzo Pitti, Florence

== Bibliography on Andrea del Sarto ==
- Alfred von Reumont, Andrea del Sarto, Leipzig: Brockhaus, 1835.
- Heinrich Wölfflin, «Andrea del Sarto». En Die Klassische Kunst: Eine Einführung in die italienische Renaissance, München: Bruckmann, 1899, pp. 149-174.
- H. Guinness, Andrea del Sarto, London: Bell, 1901.
- Emil Schaeffer, Andrea del Sarto, Berlin: Bard, Marquardt, 1904.
- Fritz Knapp, Andrea del Sarto und die Zeichnung des Cinquecento, Halle a. S.: Wilhelm Knapp, 1905.
- Fritz Knapp, Andrea del Sarto, Bielefeld-Leipzig: Velhagen & Klasing, 1907.
- Filippo Di Pietro, I disegni di Andrea del Sarto negli Uffizi, Siena: Lazzeri, 1910.
- Ch. Pfeiffer, Les madones d’Andrea del Sarto: étude critique et comparative des Vierges et des Saintes Familles du Maître florentin, Paris: Daragon, 1913.
- Hermann Voss, Die Malerei der Spätrenaissance in Rom und Florenz, Berlin: G. Grote, 1920, pp. 4-5, 100, 140, 155, 158, 160, 163, 169, 182, 184, 191-192.
- Luigi Biagi, Andrea del Sarto, Bergamo: Istituto Italiano d’Arti Grafiche, 1920.
- Giulia Sinibaldi, «Le opere di Andrea del Sarto che si conservano a Firenze». L’Arte, 1-2, 1925, pp. 5-23.
- Fritz Knapp, Andrea del Sarto, Bielefeld-Leipzig: Velhagen & Klasing, 1928.
- A. Rossi, Andrea del Sarto: cenni storici, Firenze: Memori, 1930.
- Giovanni Battista Comandé, Introduzione allo studio dell’arte di Andrea del Sarto, Palermo: Palumbo, 1951.
- Hugo Wagner, Andrea del Sarto: Seine Stellung zu Renaissance und Manierismus, Strasbourg: Heitz, 1951.
- Giovanni Battista Comandé, L’opera di Andrea del Sarto, Palermo: Edizioni della Piramide, 1952.
- Luisa Becherucci, Andrea del Sarto, Milano: Martello, 1955.
- Isolde Härth, «Zu Andrea del Sartos ‘Opfer Abrahams’». Mitteilungen des Kunsthistorischen Institutes in Florenz, 8 (3), 1959, pp. 167-173.
- John Shearman, «Andrea del Sarto’s Two Paintings of the Assumption». Burlington Magazine, 101 (673), 1959, pp. 122-134.
- John Shearman, «Three Portraits by Andrea del Sarto and His Circle». Burlington Magazine, 102 (683), 1960, pp. 58-63.
- John Shearman, «Rosso, Pontormo, Bandinelli, and Others at SS. Annunziata». Burlington Magazine, 102 (685), 1960, pp. 152-156.
- John Shearman, «Andrea del Sarto’s Portrait at Alnwick». Burlington Magazine, 102 (685), 1960, p. 167.
- Eve Borsook, The Mural Painters of Tuscany: From Cimabue to Andrea del Sarto, Oxford: Clarendon Press, 1960.
- John Shearman, «A Lost Altarpiece by Andrea del Sarto, ‘The Madonna of S. Ambrogio’». Burlington Magazine, 103 (699), 1961, pp. 225-230.
- Sydney J. Freedberg, Painting of the High Renaissance in Rome and Florence, Cambridge (Massachusetts): Harvard University Press, 1961, pp. 214-235, 442-475.
- John Shearman, «Pontormo and Andrea del Sarto, 1513». Burlington Magazine, 104 (716), 1962, pp. 450-483.
- Fiorella Sricchia Santoro (ed.), Andrea del Sarto, Milano: Fabbri, ca. 1965.
- Raffaele Monti, Andrea del Sarto, Milano: Edizioni di Comunità, 1965.
- Anna Matteoli, Andrea del Sarto e altri studi, San Miniato: Accademia degli Euteleti, 1972.
- Eve Borsook, The Mural Painters of Tuscany: From Cimabue to Andrea del Sarto, Oxford: Clarendon Press, 1980, pp. 33-34.
- Raffaele Monti, Andrea del Sarto, Milano: Edizioni di Comunità, 1981.
- Alessandro Conti, «Andrea del Sarto e Becuccio Bicchieraio». Prospettiva, 33-36, 1983-1984, pp. 161-165.
- James A. Welu, «The Worcester Andrea del Sarto: The Ups and Downs of Saint John». Worcester Art Museum Journal, 7, 1983-1984, pp. 3-17.
- John Shearman, «The Chiostro dello Scalzo». Mitteilungen des Kunsthistorischen Institutes in Florenz, 9, 1984, pp. 207-220.
- Maria Letizia Strocchi, Restauri agli Uffizi: Andrea del Sarto e Pietro Perugino, Firenze: Le Monnier, 1984.
- Annamaria Petrioli Tofani (ed.), Andrea del Sarto: disegni, Firenze: La Nuova Italia, 1985.
- Alessandro Angelini, «Recensione alla mostra Andrea del Sarto, 1486–1530: Dipinti e disegni a Firenze, Palazzo Pitti». Prospettiva, 45, 1986, pp. 85-92.
- Serena Padovani, Andrea del Sarto, Firenze: Becocci, 1986.
- Alessandro Cecchi, «Spigolature sulla committenza sartesca». Paragone Arte, 40 (477), 1989, pp. 32-41.
- Sylvie Béguin, «À propos des Andrea del Sarto au Musée du Louvre». Paragone Arte, 40 (477), 1989, pp. 3-22.
- Antonio Natali; Alessandro Cecchi, Andrea del Sarto: catalogo completo dei dipinti, Firenze: Cantini, 1989.
- Antonio Paolucci, «La pittura a Firenze nel Cinquecento». En La Pittura in Italia nel Cinquecento, vol. 1, Milano: Electa, 1989, pp. 292-294, 297.
- Luciano Bellosi, «Per Nannoccio Capassini». Antichità Viva, 33, 1994, pp. 93-95.
- Rosanna Caterina Proto Pisani, Il Chiostro dello Scalzo, Firenze: Giorgi & Gambi, 1995.
- Maddalena Spagnolo, «La fortuna di Andrea del Sarto nella riforma della Maniera». Ricerche di Storia dell’Arte, 64, 1998, pp. 35-56.
- Robert Browning, Andrea del Sarto, ed. and trans. Francesco Rognoni, Venezia: Marsilio, 1998.
- Antonio Natali, Andrea del Sarto: maestro della “maniera moderna”, Milano: Leonardo Arte, 1998.
- James H. Beck, Italian Renaissance Painting, Köln: Könemann, 1999, pp. 424-433.
- Marcia B. Hall, «The 1520s in Florence and Rome». En After Raphael. Painting in Central Italy in the Sixteenth Century, Cambridge: Cambridge University Press, 2001, pp. 66-67.
- Serena Padovani, «L’Annunciazione di Andrea del Sarto secondo Vasari: Un restauro rivelatore». Mitteilungen des Kunsthistorischen Institutes in Florenz, 45, 2001, pp. 37-59.
- Sanne Wellen, Andrea del Sarto “pittore senza errori”: Between Biography, Florentine Society, and Literature, PhD diss., Baltimore: Johns Hopkins University, 2003.
- Rosanna Caterina Proto Pisani (ed.), Il Chiostro dello Scalzo a Firenze: studio e scuola di pittura = The Cloister of the Scalzo in Florence: a study and school of art, Livorno: Sillabe, 2004.
- Stefano de Rosa, “La pittura senza errori” di Andrea del Sarto: commento artistico e sua grandezza sofferta e moderna, Firenze: NICOMP L. E., 2004.
- Willi Hirdt, Barfuß zum lieben Gott: der Freskenzyklus Andrea del Sartos im Florentiner Chiostro dello Scalzo, Tübingen-Basel: Francke, 2006.
- Jonathan Unglaub, «Bernardo Accolti, Raphael’s ‘Parnassus’ and a New Portrait by Andrea del Sarto». Burlington Magazine, 149 (1246), 2007, pp. 14-22.
- Giovanni Malanima; Emilio Polverini, Andrea del Sarto a Castelnuovo d’Àvane, Firenze: Pagnini, 2011.
- Claudio Strinati, Andrea del Sarto: un San Sebastiano ritrovato, Roma: Gangemi, 2013.
- Julian Brooks, Andrea del Sarto: The Renaissance Workshop in Action, Los Angeles: J. Paul Getty Museum, 2015.
- Dominique Cordellier, «Drawings by Andrea del Sarto after Ancient and Modern Sources». En Julian Brooks, Andrea del Sarto: The Renaissance Workshop in Action, Los Angeles: J. Paul Getty Museum, 2015, pp. 20-27.
- Marzia Faietti, «The Red-Chalk Drawings of Andrea del Sarto: Linear Form and Luminous Naturalism». En Julian Brooks, Andrea del Sarto: The Renaissance Workshop in Action, Los Angeles: J. Paul Getty Museum, 2015, pp. 28-35.
- Xavier F. Salomon, «Portraits (cat. 1–8)». En Julian Brooks, Andrea del Sarto: The Renaissance Workshop in Action, Los Angeles: J. Paul Getty Museum, 2015, pp. 36-53.
- Yvonne Szafran; Sue Ann Chui, «A Perfectionist Revealed: The Resourceful Methods of Andrea del Sarto». En Julian Brooks, Andrea del Sarto: The Renaissance Workshop in Action, Los Angeles: J. Paul Getty Museum, 2015, pp. 13-19.
- Sanne Wellen, «The Shortcomings of the ‘Pittore Senza Errori’: Andrea del Sarto in Vasari’s Lives». En Julian Brooks, Andrea del Sarto: The Renaissance Workshop in Action, Los Angeles: J. Paul Getty Museum, 2015, pp. 145-151.
- Giovanni Malanima (ed.), L’eredità di Andrea del Sarto: “inventario delle robe”, Firenze: Pagnini, 2015.
- Antonio Natali, Firenze 1517: l’apocalisse e i pittori, Firenze: Edizioni Polistampa, 2017.
- Ludovica Sebregondi, Andrea del Sarto, Firenze: Giunti, 2018.
- Helen Glanville; Claudio Seccaroni (eds.), Andrea del Sarto e dintorni: Dossier = Around Andrea del Sarto: Dossier, Torino: Lexis, 2018.
- Natalia Di Bartolo, Corpus di saggi per il Bicentenario di Francesco Di Bartolo (1826–2026), OperaeOpera, 2026.
