= Chiostro dello Scalzo =

Cloister in Florence, Italy

Coordinates: 43°46′47″N 11°15′34″E

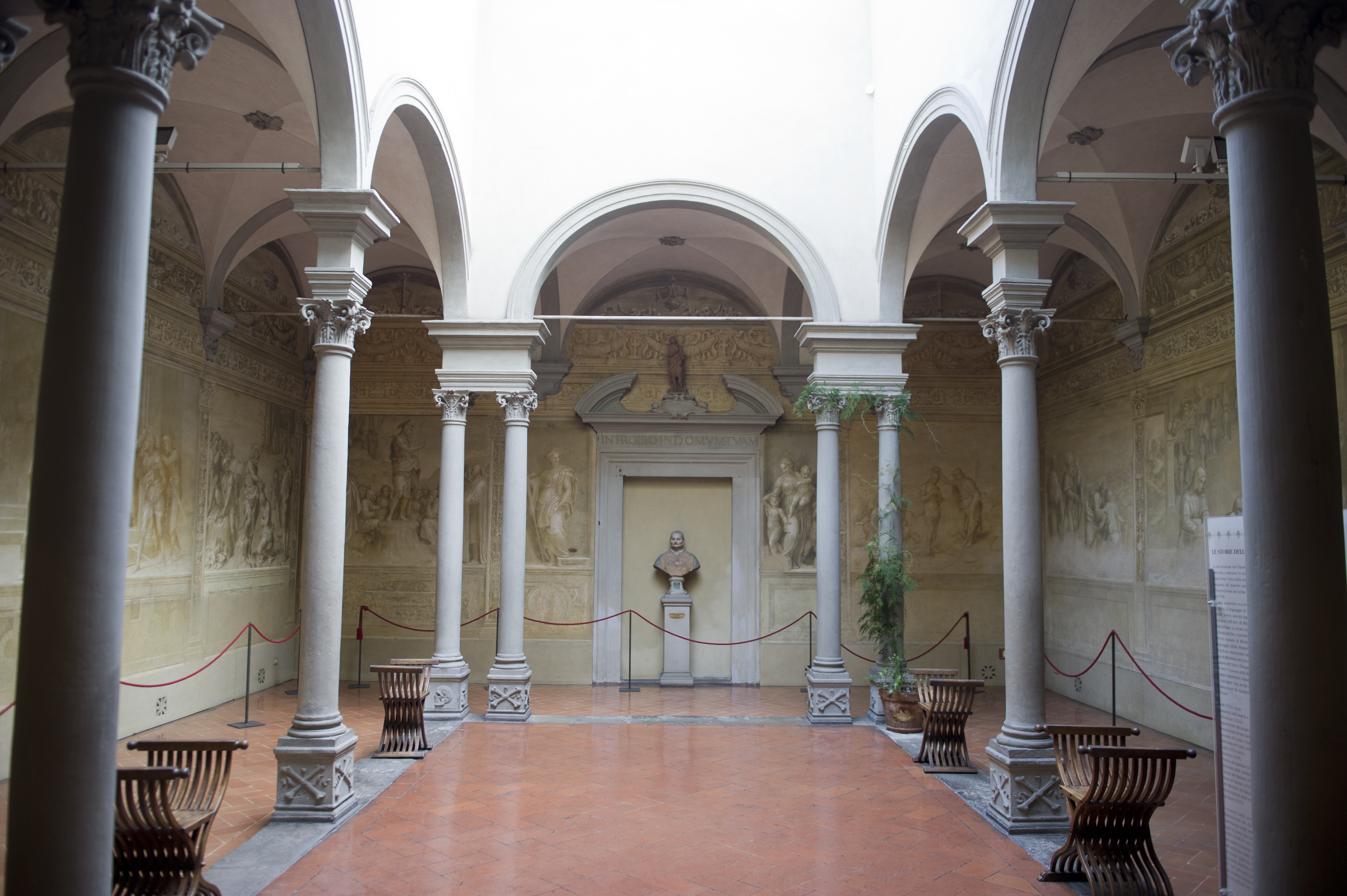
View from entrance

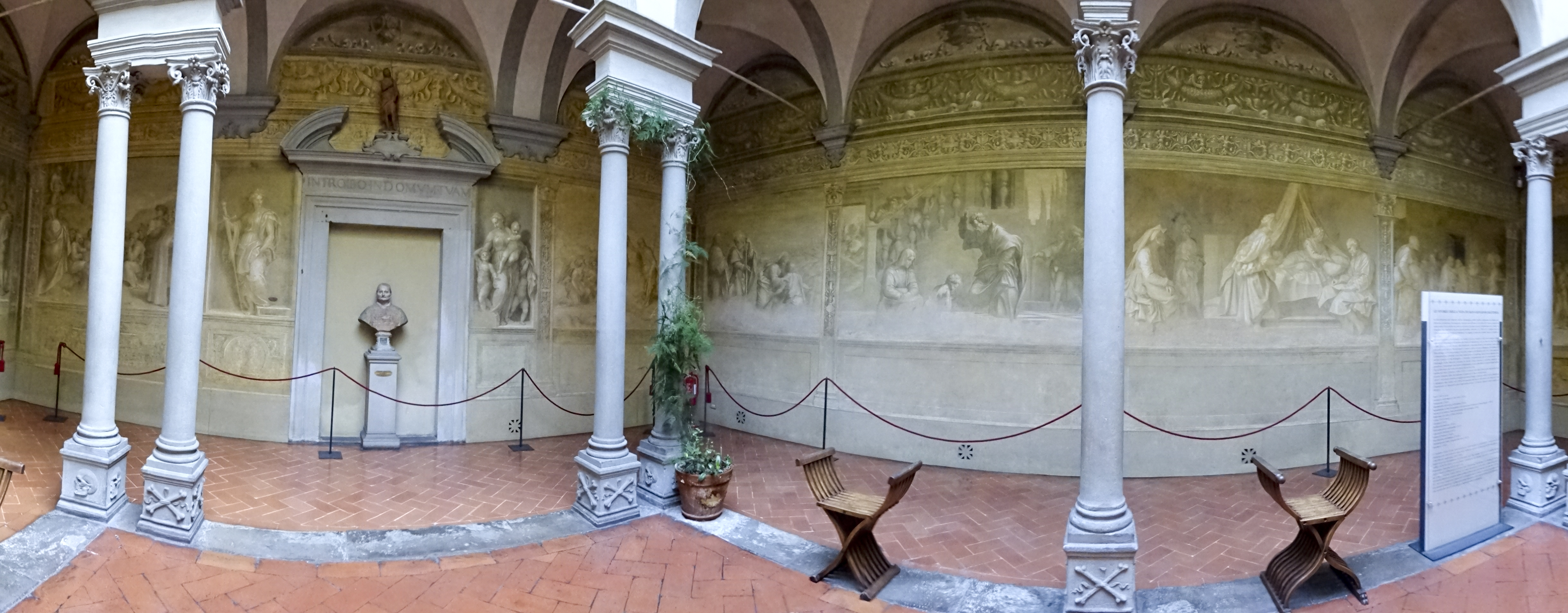
The north and east walls

The Chiostro della Scalzo or (Via Cavour, 69 vicino a Piazza San Marco) is a cloister in Florence, Italy that originally led to a chapel once belonging to a religious company known as the Compagnia del diciplinati di San Giovanni Battista or della Passione di Cristo. The term "scalzo" makes reference to the barefoot brother who carried the Cross during its public processions.

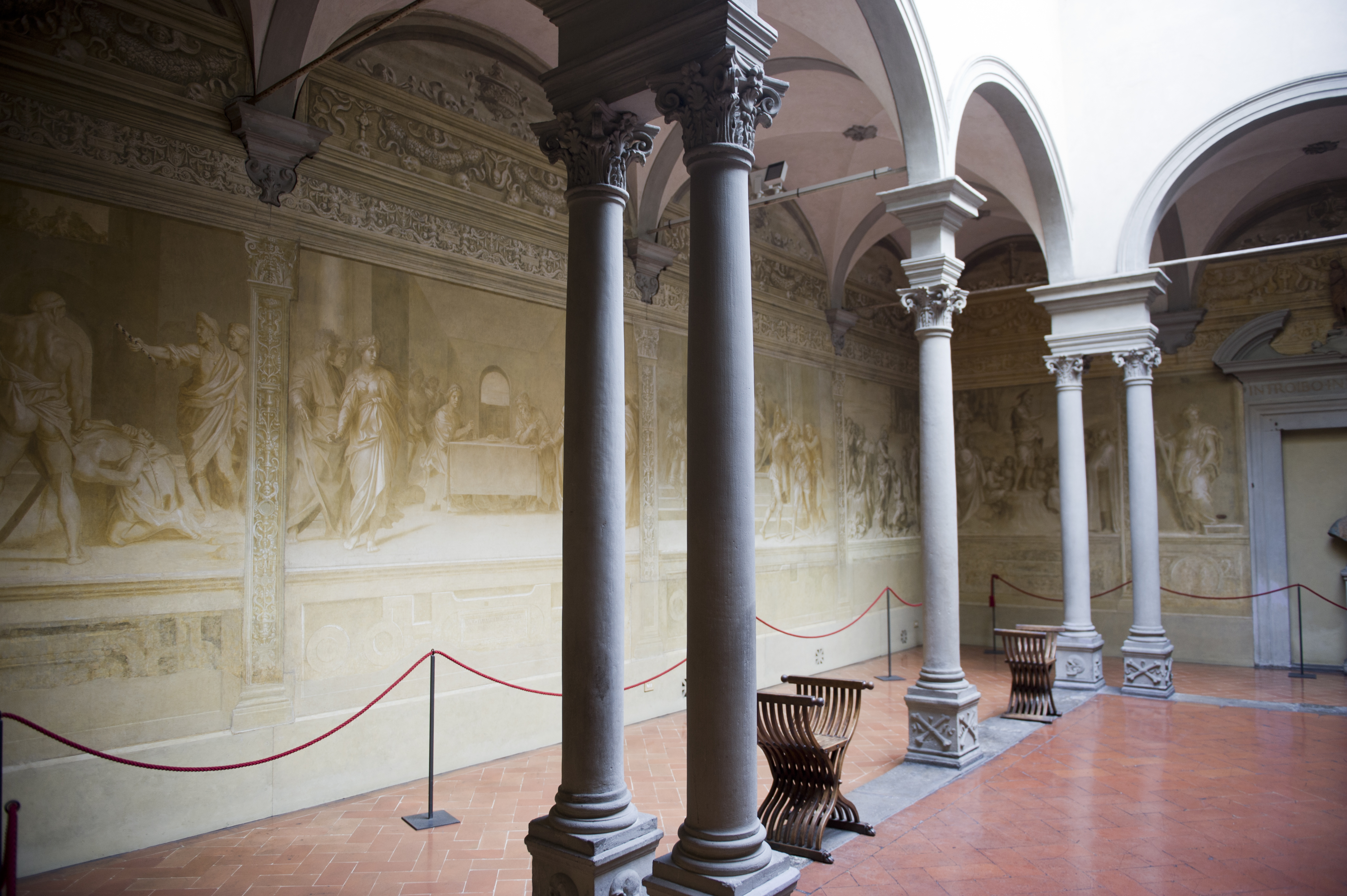
The west wall

"Compagnia" (English: "company") was the name given to these Florentine congregations of layman who contributed towards defending Roman Catholicism. Each company had a different practice: the "Laudesi" promoted prayer through the singing of hymns, those for the doctrine taught catechism to children, while the charitable companies offered assistance to the poor. The Compagnia della Scalzo was a disciplined confraternity that practiced penance, often in the form of self-flagellation.

The Compagnia della Scalzo was established in 1376, and used the church of San Giovannino dei Cavalieri on the via San Gallo as early as 1390 for its meetings. When the company purchased land behind this church in the first half of the 15th century, it proceeded towards creating its own premises, which included a chapel (consecrated in 1476, but then totally renovated), the cloister and entrance (1478) still visible today. Back in 1455, it underwent a reform approved by the bishop of Florence, Antoninus, who was made saint in 1523 and who is portrayed in the painted terra-cotta bust now placed in front of the former doorway that led to the chapel.

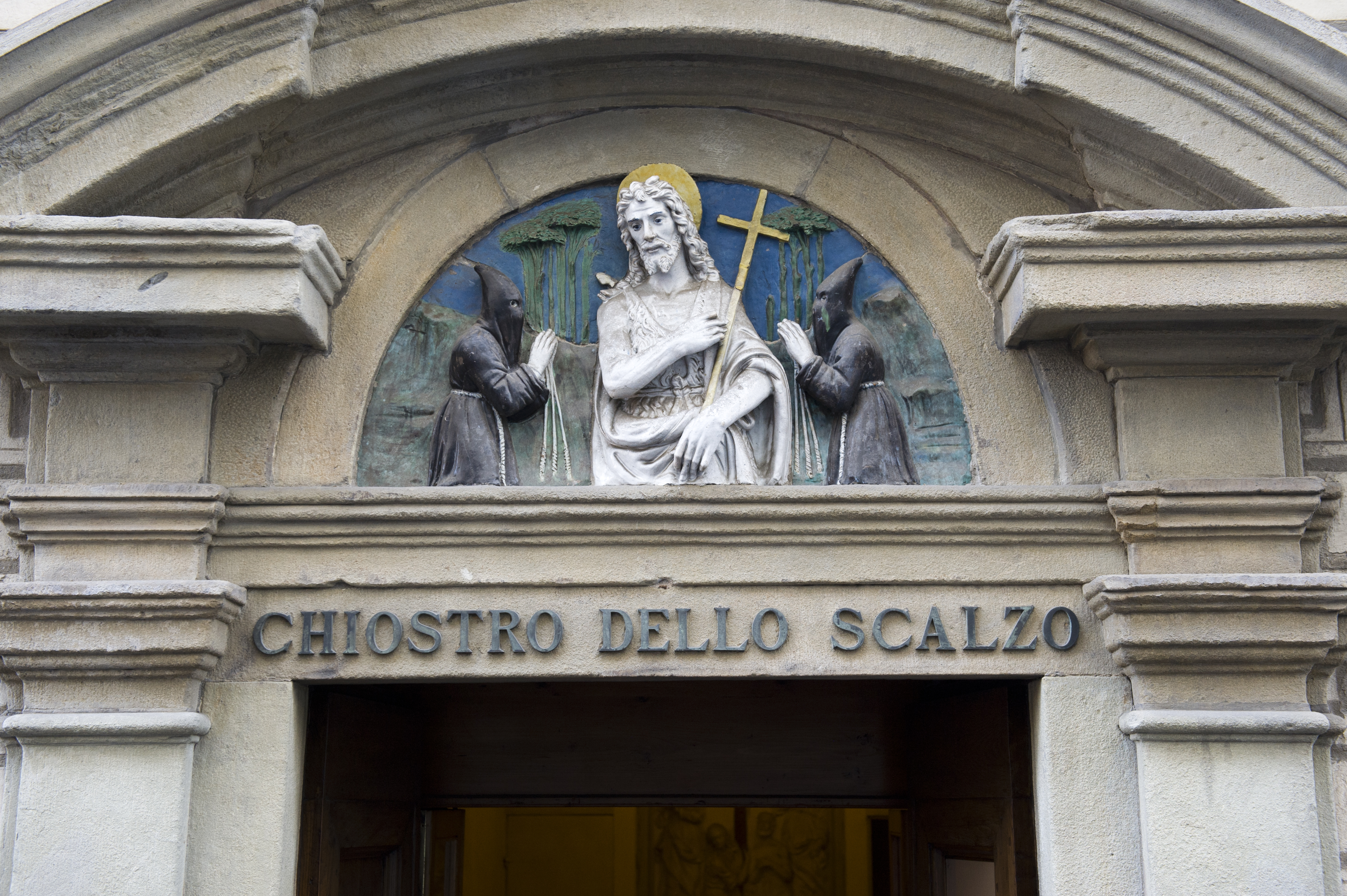
Painted terra-cotta over the entrance

The brothers wore black hoods with holes to see through and a heavy, black over garment tied around the waist with a white cord; such apparel is documented in the polychrome glazed terra-cotta relief depicting St. John the Baptist and Two Brothers (1510 c.) over the entrance to the cloister from via Cavour. Every first Sunday of the month the company organized a procession and every June 24, the festivities in honor of the city's and its own patron saint, John the Baptist, which today see events like the famous fireworks (I fochi di san Giovanni).

== The Cloister ==
The space of the rectangular-shaped cloister was once divided by 6 columns; in bad weather, a straw mat was attached to cover the opening in the slanted roof. Wooden benches lined the walls.

Around 1508-1509, Andrea del Sarto, who was a member of the Scalzo, received a commission from the brothers to paint a series of murals in grisaille, tones of grey, with scenes from the life of St. John the Baptist. He worked on these for many years, interrupting his work on a number of occasions. In 1518-1519, while in France, Andrea was replaced by Francesco di Cristofano who painted two of the scenes. Andrea del Sarto completed the Scalzo cycle in 1526.

In 1722, architect Pietro Giovannozzi made substantial modifications to the original structure by adding the groin vault ceiling, the broken pediments over the doors and the four double columns at the corners. The lunettes that were created from the new vaults were decorated in a style that tried to imitate the 16th-century style of the frescoes. when the company was suppressed in 1786, part of the chapel which opened up on what is today via Cavour and the cloister was acquired by Pietro Leopoldo of Lorraine, Grand Duke of Tuscany, while the rest of the property, which included the church, was put up for sale and refitted for other purposes. The cloister was then under the control of the Accademia di Belle Arti before being taken over by the government which opened the Scalzo to the public in 1891. It remained closed for many years and was finally reopened in 1995, when the detached and restored frescoes were reinstalled.

== The Frescoes ==
The murals comprise twelve scenes from the life of St. John the Baptist and form a narrative that begins to the right of the entrance. The first scene is the Annunciation to Zachary (1523), followed by The Visitation (1524), then The Birth of the Baptist (1526), The Blessing of the Young St. John (1519), Meeting of Jesus and the Young St. John the Baptist in the Desert (1518), The Baptism of the Christ (ca. 1509-1510), The Baptist Preaching to the Crowds (1515), The Baptism of the Crowds (1517), St. John's Capture (1517), The Dance of Salome (1522), The Beheading of St. John the Baptist (1523), and The Presentation of the Head of St. John the Baptist (1523). The date of each scene does not follow the narrative sequence.

01 Annunciation to Zachary, Andrea del Sarto	02 The Visitation, Andrea del Sarto	03 Birth of the Baptist, Andrea del Sarto
04 Blessing of the Young St. John, Francesco di Cristofano	05 Meeting of Jesus and the Young St John, Francesco di Cristofano	06 Baptism of Christ, Andrea del Sarto
07 Baptist Preaching to the Crowds, Andrea del Sarto	08 Baptism of the Crowds, Andrea del Sarto	09 St. John's Capture, Andrea del Sarto
10 Dance of Salome, Andrea del Sarto	11 Beheading of St. John, Andrea del Sarto	12 Presentation of the Head of St. John, Andrea del Sarto

The cycle also includes four figures representing Christian virtues into tromp l'oeil niches to look like sculptures: Faith (ca. 1523) and Hope (1523), flank the entrance and carry the Latin inscription "Laudate Dominum in trio sancto eius" ("Praise the Lord in His holy place"), while Charity (ca. 1513) and Justice (1515) flank the former passage way into the chapel with another Latin phrase, "Introbibo in Domum Tuam" ("I shall enter your household").

The narrative scheme is framed by pilasters and cornices decorated with patterns. Such pictorial elements blend with the architecture of the cloister.

The main artist here is Andrea del Sarto (Florence, 1486-1530), whose portrait can be admired in the plaster bust placed over the entrance by Domenico Geri (1724). Andrea was one of the greatest painters of his time and was called by the biographer Giorgio Vasari in his 1568 edition of Lives "a most excellent artist", "without error". Andrea worked in all media - drawings, oil paint and fresco - and received altar piece commissions as well as devotional scenes, portraits as well as mythological subjects. Although he created his own style, he was influenced by Flemish and German prints (e.g. Albrecht Dürer and Lucas van Leyden), antique sculpture, particularly Hellenistic, the great masters of Florentine figurative art (Masaccio, Ghiberti and Ghirlandaio) and the high renaissance style of his contemporaries such as Michelangelo and Raphael.

As in other cases, del Sarto called for the collaboration of fellow artist Francesco di Cristofano, known as Il Franciabigio (Florence, 1424 - ca. 1525), who shared a workshop with him. In the two scenes at the Scalzo by Franciabigio, The Blessing of the Young St. John in the Desert and The Meeting of Jesus and the Young St. John in the Desert, a less formal and more intimate atmosphere is achieved.

Paintings by both these artists are housed in the major state museums in Florence - the Palatine Gallery in Pitti Palace, the Uffizi Gallery, the Museum of Andrea del Sartio's Last Supper at San Salvi, and the Accademia. Other major fresco cycles can be admired at Santissima Annunziata, the in Medici villa at Poggio a Caiano and at San Salvi.

The frescoes were removed using the strappo technique by Leonetto Tintori between February, 1963 and July, 1968. They were exhibited 1968-69 at the Metropolitan Museum of Art, the Rijks museum in Amsterdam, and the Hayward Gallery in London.

== Iconography ==
Important sources for the general design and content of the scenes can be found in the many art works in Florence dedicated to the life of the patron saint of the city. Major works depicting St. John the Baptist can be found in the Baptistry (the mosaics on the vault, the bronze doors by Andrea Pisano, and the great silver altar now in the Museo dell'Opera del Duomo) in the frescoes by Giotto for the Peruzzi Chapel in the church of Santa Croce, those by Filippo Lippi in the cathedral of Prato and, the frescoes by Ghirlandaio for the Chancel, or Tornabuoni Chapel in Santa Maria Novella.
