= Villa di Poggio a Caiano =

Renaissance villa in Tuscany, Italy

Coordinates: 43.8174°N 11.0562°E

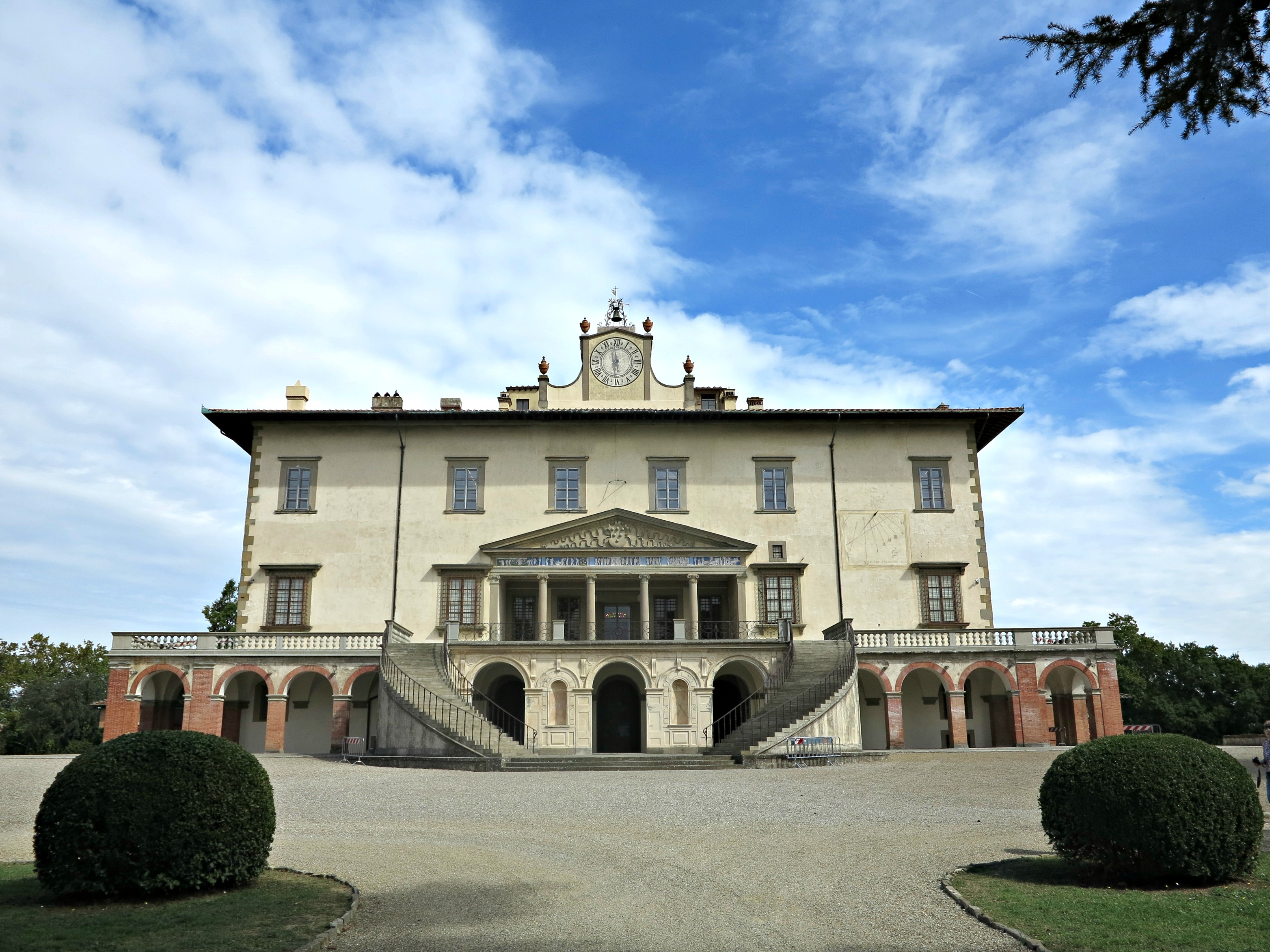
Medici Villa of Poggio a Caiano

The Medici Villa of Poggio a Caiano, also called Ambra, is one of the most famous Medici villas and is located in Poggio a Caiano (Prato). Today it is state owned and it houses two museums: one of the historic apartments (ground floor and first floor) and the Museum of Still Life (second floor).

The villa is perhaps the best example of architecture commissioned by Lorenzo il Magnifico, in this case to Giuliano da Sangallo towards 1480. It is no coincidence that this is a private building, where there are elements that later modeled for the future developments of the type of villas: internal and external penetration through filters such as loggias, symmetrical distribution of environments around a central salon ("Centrifugal" space), dominant position in the landscape, conscious recovery of classical architectural elements (such as the barrel vault and the ionic temple façade).

== History ==
=== Fifteenth Century ===
The villa is located in the middle of a hilltop, the last offshoot of the Montalbano mountains, in a strategic position, lying on the promontory towards the Ombrone river and the plain and dominating the road between Florence and Pistoia, which overwhelms the small heights here.

It was built by Lorenzo de' Medici after buying a rustic farm from Giovanni di Paolo Rucellai, who in turn had bought what was then a simple fortress from Palla Strozzi, built by the [Cancellieri family of Pistoia at the beginning of the fifteenth century.

After a period of intensive land acquisition by the Medici family, in the area of Poggio a Caiano and also on the other bank of the Ombrone river, at Tavola, between 1470 and 1474, Lorenzo commissioned Giuliano da Sangallo to build a villa that became the prototype of the country's noble residences in the following centuries. In fact, Lorenzo, through his favorite architect, was among the first to conceive of an agrarian space in which the territory was ordered and shaped according to the requirements of harmony. At that time it began to set the idea of the villa-fortress (like the Villa Medici at Careggi, more like a castle made only thirty years ago by Michelozzo for Cosimo the Elder, the grandfather of Lorenzo). This new aptitude was due to political issues, thanks to the period of peace and stability reached by Lorenzo's politics, and philosophical, according to the humanists.

Among the innovations of the era, the porch was placed on the ground floor (almost an interconnected area between the surrounding landscape and the villa), the classic porch and pediment on the piano nobile and the lack of a central courtyard. Gradually the villa was enriched with works in a 'continuum' between architecture, painting and sculpture. The fresco of Filippino Lippi dates back to the period under the loggia on the first floor and perhaps the glazed majolica pediment attributed to Andrea Sansovino (some historians refer to a second phase of construction).

Giuliano da Sangallo designed another building within the estate: It is a square and bastioned structure at the central court, called "Cascine" located on the other shore of the Umbrella and which, as a center of agricultural activity, built before the villa, was its ideal counterweight in the overall territorial design.

At the death of Lorenzo in 1492 the work at the villa was still largely unfinished and was halted between 1495 and 1513 because of the exile of the Medici from Florence. The villa was complete only for a third, the base (Ttura) with the already complete porch and the floor planks on the first floor of the vault covering the central salon.

=== Sixteenth Century ===
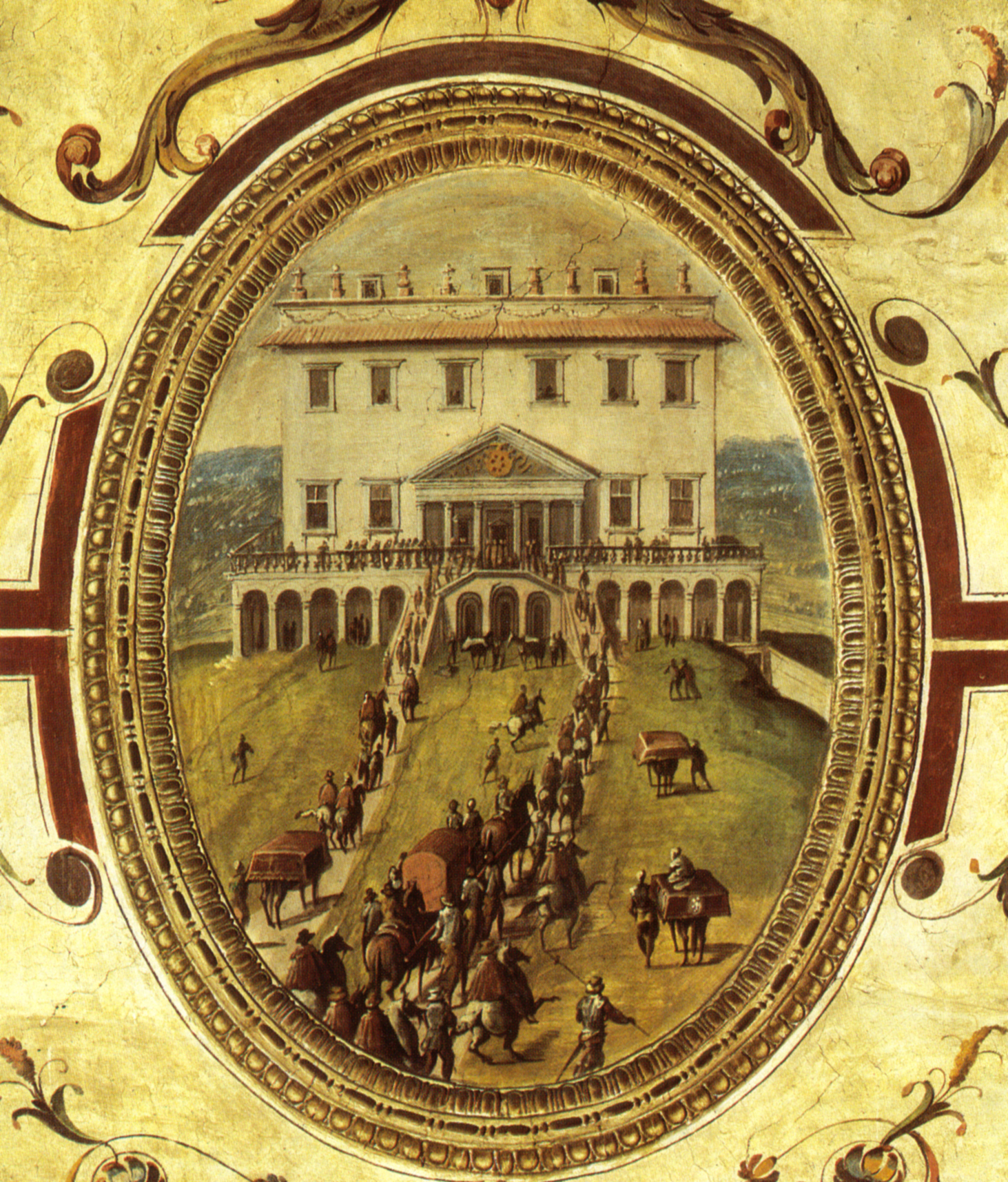
Eleanor of Toledo enters Poggio a Caiano, Fresco of Giovanni Stradano in Palazzo Vecchio

Between 1513 and 1520, after the return of the Medici, the works were completed on the initiative of the son of Lorenzo the Magnificent, Giovanni, who had in the meantime became Pope Leo X. Giuliano da Sangallo, now an old man, was able to follow the work only occasionally and until 1516, the year of his death. However, the works continued according to his plan, probably also documented by a wooden model. The vault of the central hall on the first floor was made with the papal coat of arms (which was then referred to as Leo X's Lion), under the direction of Andrea di Cosimo Feltrini and Franciabigio. From the beginning, the large barrel vault had caused concern to the buyers, who feared a collapse. This fear was allayed by Sebastiano Ximenes because of the work on his own Palazzo Ximenes da Sangallo in Florence.

Already in Leo X's day, the frescoes of the salon were started by the greatest Florentine masters of the time: Pontormo, Andrea del Sarto and Franciabigio himself. The paintings were completed some fifty years later by Alessandro Allori, with a rethinking of the original project in a more monumental key, giving more space to the figures than to painted architectures.

The villa was the place where foreign brides of the family members in Florence were welcomed. Here, among other events, were the weddings of Alessandro de' Medici and Margaret of Austria (1536), between Cosimo I and Eleanor of Toledo (1539), Francesco I and Bianca Cappello, already his lover (1579). Bianca and Francesco also found death in this villa, for causes not fully clarified and suspected of poisoning.

=== Seventeenth and Eighteenth Century ===
In 1661 Marguerite Louise d'Orléans, cousin of Louis XIV and wife of Cosimo III came to Florence. The princess, profoundly different from Cosimo's dark and ultra-religious character, and at odds with the Grand Duke's mother Vittoria della Rovere, was never happy in her marriage or in Tuscany. She wanted to return to France, and after years of strife went to live at Poggio a Caiano in 1672 or 1673, under guard to prevent her leaving for France. In order to alleviate the "captivity", in addition to the follow-up of some 150 people, Cosimo III built the theater on the ground floor. Marguerite Louise lived at the villa before returning permanently to France in 1675.

There were often comedies in the theatrical theater and here he had assembled a unique collection called the Cabinet of Works in Small of All The Most Famous Painters. It was a picture gallery set in a single room of the villa, which contained 174 paintings of as many different painters, the largest of which measured 100x75 cm, and which included works by some of the most important artists, Dürer, Leonardo da Vinci, Raphael, Rubens and so on. Today it is no longer present, because it was dispersed in 1773 by Leopold I. The Cabinet Room was frescoed by Sebastiano Ricci with an Allegory of the Arts, but this work has also been lost in subsequent renovations. The monumental organ of the Roman Lorenzo Testa (1703), already in Palazzo Pitti and today in the theater, is the result of Ferdinando de' Medici, Grand Prince of Tuscany's deep interest in music.

The necessary maintenance work and periodic restoration were carried out, though, according to their economic strategy, they intended to resize their landholdings: they began to no longer use some villas (such as the Ambrogiana and Lappeggi), bringing the furnishings into Palazzo Pitti and the surviving residences. Poggio a Caiano did not suffer this fate, and only a few furnishings testify to that period, such as the small wooden chest of drawers with inlays depicting views and landscapes. The architectsGiuseppe and Giovan Battista Ruggeri cared for a general restoration, with the renovation of the theater and the affixing of a clock on the façade.

At the time of Ferdinand III of Tuscany, the park in front of the villa was equipped with some fun facilities: a "flying arcana", a swing, a "donkey rider" and a "carousel of horses", which are still stored today by the museum.

=== Nineteenth Century ===
Concerts held at the theater of the villa included Giovanni Paisello, Etienne Nicolas Méhul and Gaspare Spontini. The frescoes of neoclassical Luigi Catani are in this hallway in the entrance hall on the first floor and in seventeen rooms of the villa, to which various guided artists collaborated Always from Catani.

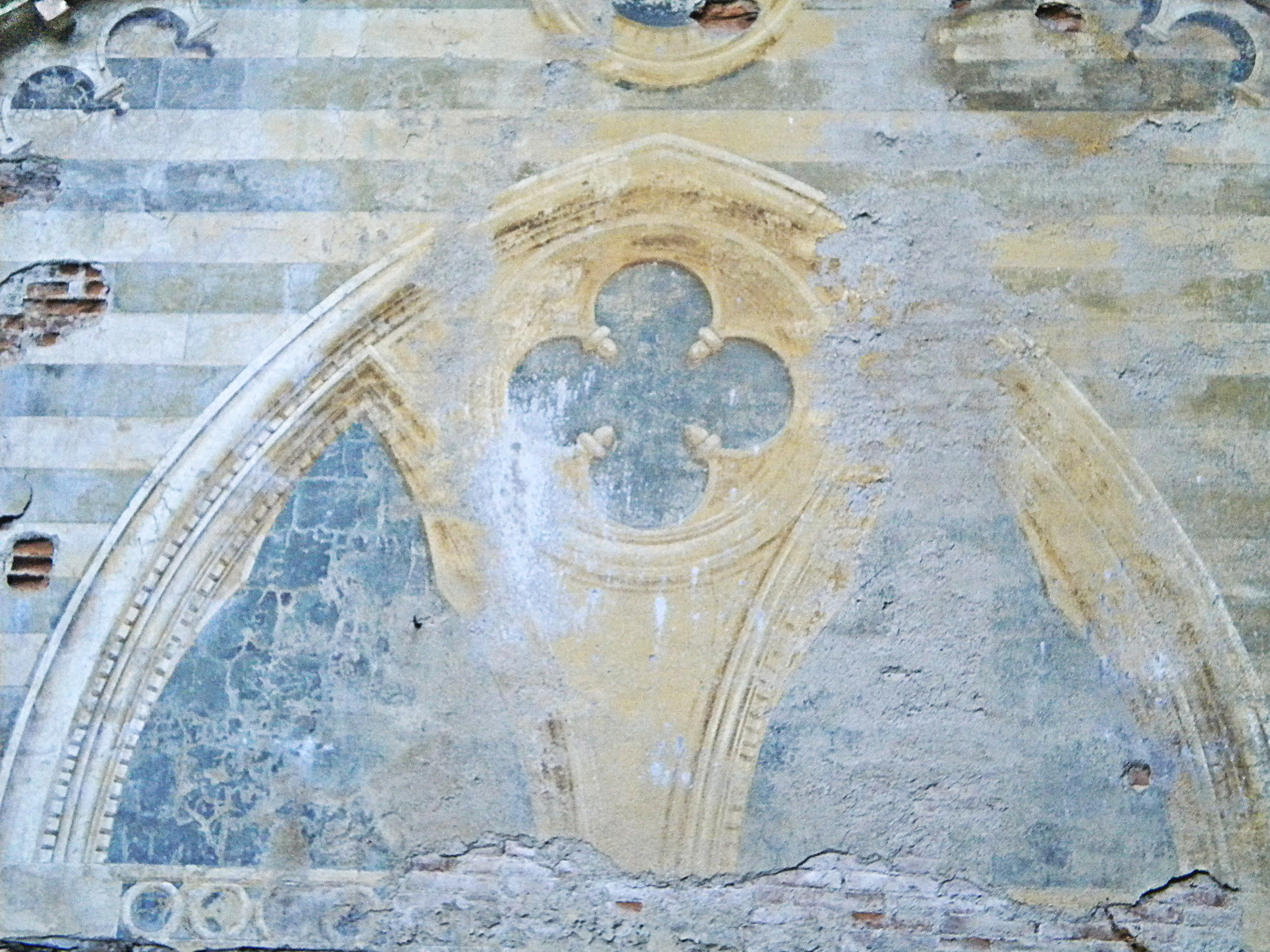
Detail of the Diana Temple in the English garden

Commissioned by Elisa Bonaparte in 1811, Giuseppe Manetti designed new English Gardens, featuring irregular avenues, a pond, and small neoclassical pavilions, such as a conical glacier and a temple of Diana. The project was only completed later and partially.

With the restoration (1819) repairs and restoration work continued (especially in the garden where the lemonaia was built, solemn work by Pasquale Poccianti, and English park was completed.

In the 1828 the sundials were arranged on the sides of the building. While following the unification of Italy the interior of the villa was updated with fine furnishings from the royal palaces of Modena, Piacenza, Parma, Turin, Lucca and Bologna and used as a residence by the House of Savoy.

=== 20th Century and Contemporary Era ===
During the Second World War, the villa was used as a haven from bombing for important works of art from all over Tuscany, such as the statues of Michelangelo or Monument of the Four Moors of Livorno, etc. In addition, during the Allied invasion of Italy, the villa was used as a shelter for the displaced population, who took refuge in the large underground basements and tunnels.

In 1984 it became a national museum and since then has begun an important restoration cycle, where thanks to a precious inventory dated 1911, the interior of the villa was re-constructed as much as possible, recovering all the objects, furniture and artwork scattered among the various museums and state depots.

In the villa and in the gardens were filmed scenes of the movie Darling (1965) directed by John Schlesinger.

The restoration was concluded in 2007 with the opening to the public of the second floor, where the Museum of Still Life was housed, in which the great paintings of Bartolomeo Bimbi As well as other works from the Medici villas of Castello, Topaia, Ambrogiana and others.

On the night of 6 March 2017, about 30 meters of the wall surrounding the villa grounds collapsed. Heavy rainfall had undermined its foundation.

=== Proposals for the future ===
The activity of researchers and restorers has now focused on restoration to make available to the public other parts of the villa. Among them are the 17th-century Cucinone and the underground Criptoportico that links it to the villa. This environment is one of the best preserved examples of architecture tailored to the home needs of a court: it includes several rooms for laundry use and also a vegetable garden with aromatic herbs for use in kitchens. Along with the 'Ballroom Hall', once a playground, these rooms could be used for the exhibition of the eighteenth-century rides.

== Description ==
=== Exterior ===
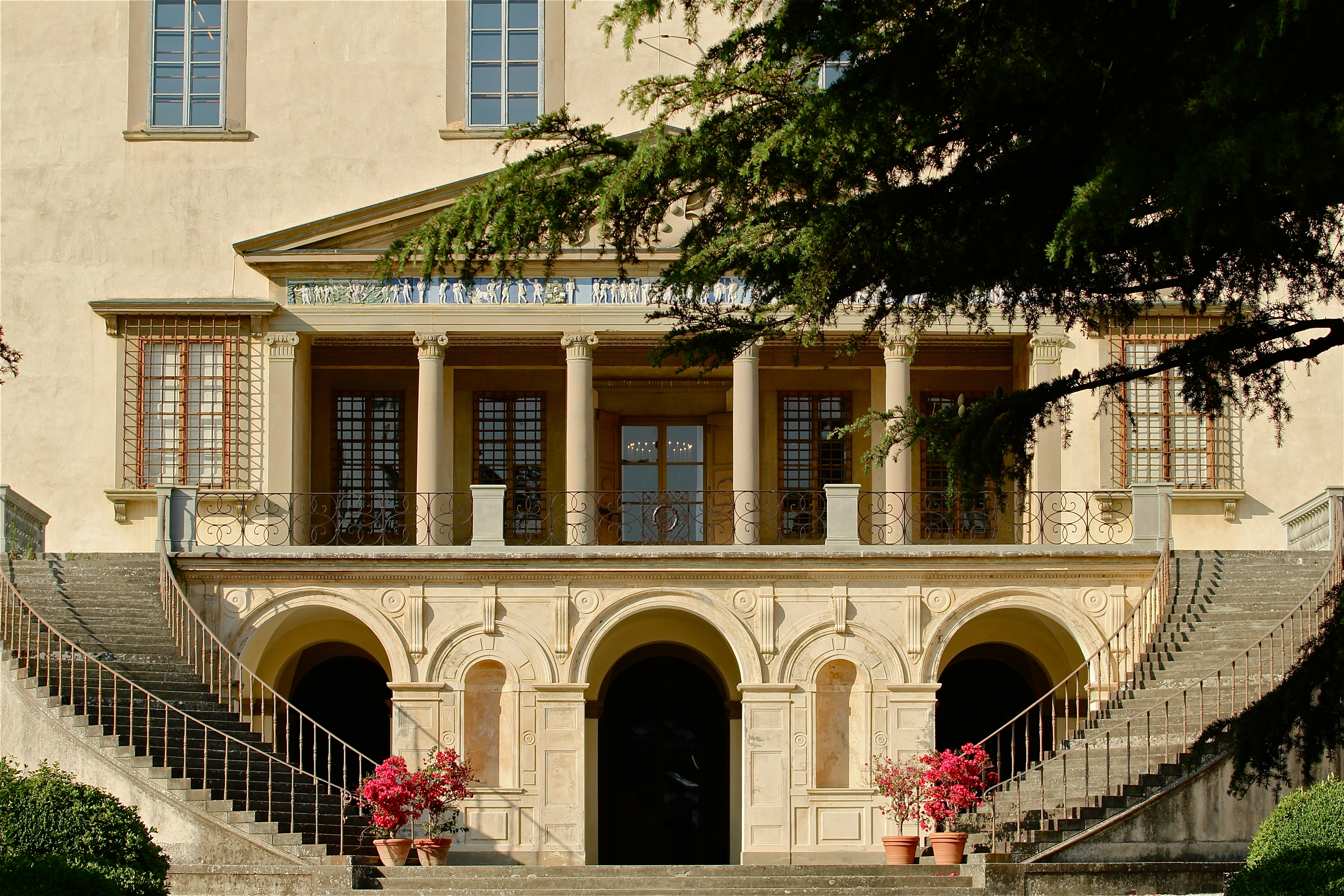
The loggia between the two steps of the staircase

The roof was modified when in 1575 Alfonso Parigi the Elder replaced the gutter, where there was a walkway and a crowning with a railing with fires, with a sloping roof, also obtaining an elevation of the prospect that altered significantly the proportions of Sangallo's initial project. The windows that were initially crossed, that is, divided into four parts with a kind of central stone cross, were modified, according to a late-fifteenth century model invented by Baccio d'Agnolo. In the seventeenth century, however, the clock tower was added in axis with the central pediment.

==== Frieze ====
The triangle (white, blue and green) frieze that today is seen on the tympanum mantel on the main façade of the villa is a copy made in 1986 by the manufacturer Richard Ginori, while the original is in a room on the first floor of the villa. This work is 14 meters long and 22 feet long, 58 centimeters long, of uncertain attribution and dating. It is principally attributed to Andrea Sansovino regarding the construction phase of Lorenzo il Magnifico, as It refers to the theme of the return to the Age of gold, or performed by Giuliano da Sangallo or Bertoldo. Two phases, the second of which ended at the time of Leo X.

The refined and emblematic theme could also represent the choice of souls according to Platonic myth. In any case, it is clear the nature of the expression of the complex initiatory climate, relating to the philosophical circle of Lorenzo, through a series of allegorical allegories, of evocative classicism.

=== Interior ===
The interior of the villa has undergone several transformations that have changed its original appearance over the years.

==== Ground floor ====
Behind the staircase, under the loggia surrounding the villa, where there are four Roman sarcophagi, you enter the apartments on the ground floor. This floor in the sixteenth century was considered still secondary to the piano nobile, so the upgrading of these environments dates back mostly to the following centuries, with the exception of Bianca Cappello's apartments.

The entrance hall is plastered in A light yellow color and contains some inscriptions on Victor Emmanuel II and the plebiscite that united the Grand Duchy of Tuscany to the nascent Kingdom of Italy.

The "Teatro delle Commedie" was first created by 1675 Marguerite Louise d'Orléans the little-known wife of Cosimo III. It was in fact relegated to Poggio a Caiano, and to alleviate his reclusive life he thought to make a theater, of which we have the first mention in 1697. The use of the theater became more frequent with Prince Ferdinand.

The Billiard Hall is in the Savoyard style, with a frescoed ceiling as a pergola from which overlook cherubs and cupids while a cloth painting displays real signs of the House of Savoy.

==== Bianca Cappello Apartment ====
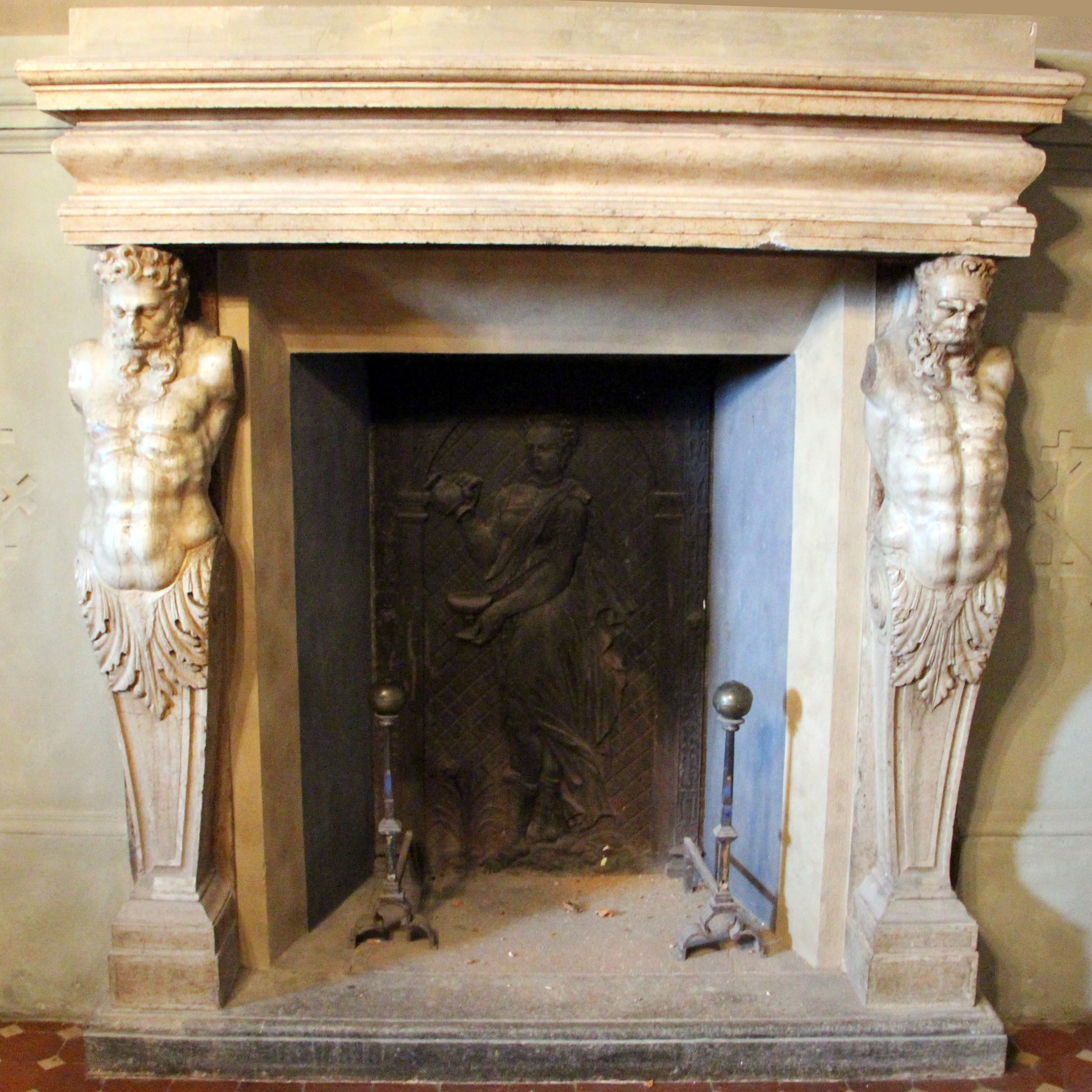
The Buontalenti fireplace

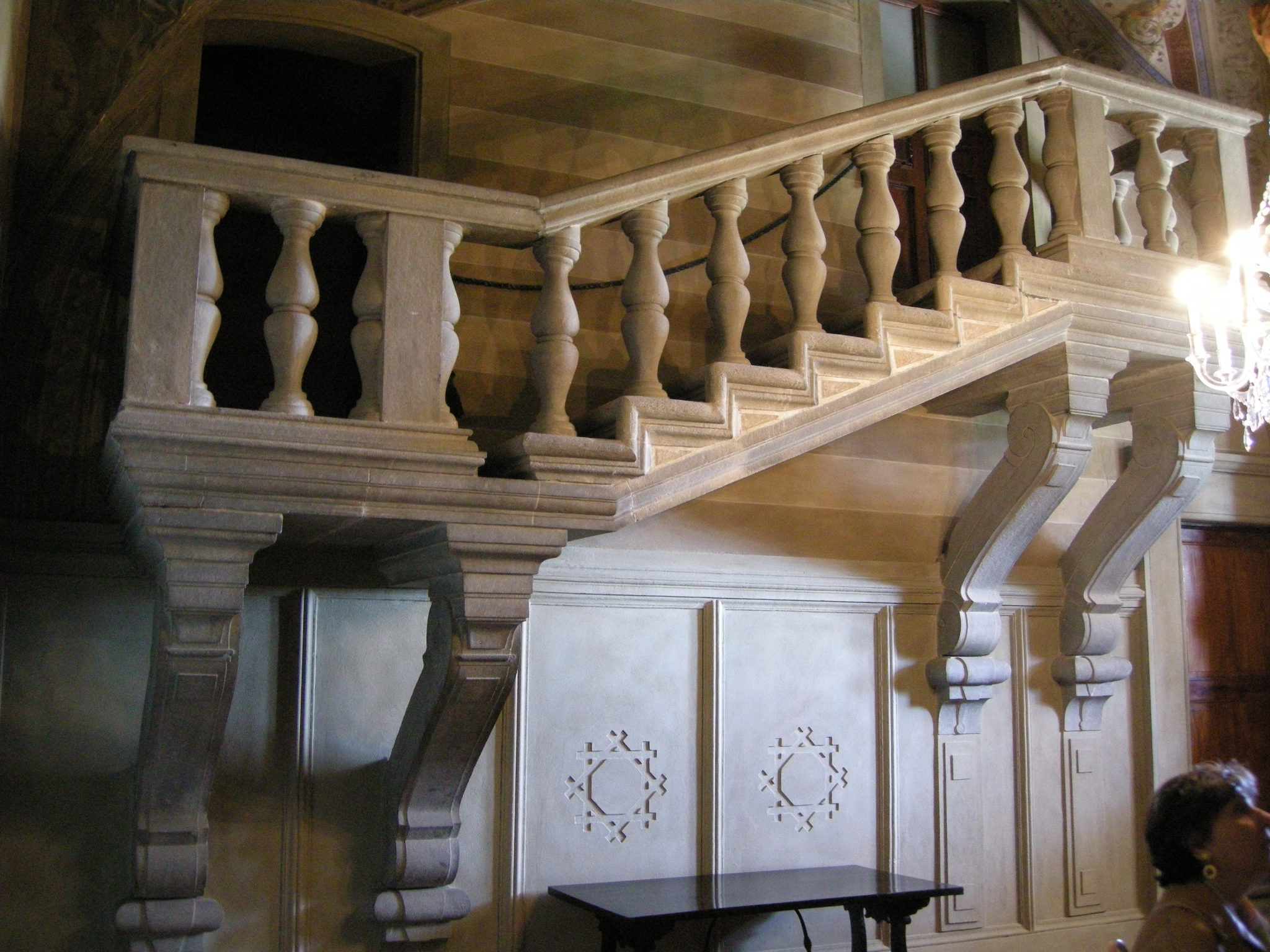
Bianca Cappello's staircase

To the right there is access to the Bianca Cappello apartments, where it is possible to perceive more clearly than elsewhere the Renaissance aspect of the villa. Bianca Cappello was a well-educated and sophisticated Venetian noblewoman who had a relationship with Grand Duke Francesco I. This secret relationship involving the ruler of the city, already married to Joanna of Austria, and a newly married woman, was one of the greatest scandals of the Renaissance and one of the most romantic pages of the Medici saga: even though the two lovers did everything to be secret, their story was a topic of rumors from the beginning.

They lived some of their most important moments at Poggio a Caiano. Bianca was relegated to the villa, hated by the family and the Medici court, who sided with the legitimate wife, strategically removed from Florence. At first she was confined to a secondary villa on the heights of Poggio a Caiano called Il Cerretino, and on that occasion some popular fantasies arose, such as the existence of an underground corridor between the two villas that would allow the two lovers to meet secretly. With the death of Bianca's husband and Joanna, the two lovers could finally marry and spend at Poggio a Caiano some of the most beautiful moments of their married life. The Bianca Cappello apartments on the ground floor still testify to this connection with the villa. In the villa, the two of them also died in October 1587, one day away from the other: a 2004–2006 study speaks of arsenic intoxication in the tissues of the two, although it is not possible to understand whether it is a post-mortem treatment on some symbolic organs buried together in the Church of Santa Maria Assunta at Bonistalloh. (The official chronicles speak of tertian fever.)

In the first hall of these apartments, a simple anteroom, there are three paintings on a biblical subject attributed to Paolo Veronese: Moses and the Burning Bush, The Passage of the Red Sea and the Resurrection of Lazarus; Here after the restoration was also the Pietà of Giorgio Vasari, coming from the chapel of the villa that today belongs to the local mercy mission.

Following is the "room of the Camino" of the apartments of Bianca Cappello. The room, although eclectically restored in the 19th century, still retains the beautiful white marble fireplace, with the floor supported by two telamons carved with remarkable plastic strength. The paternity of the work has not yet been clarified, but the scope of creation is surely close to Bernardo Buontalenti, as evidenced by the elusiveness of the torso and the imaginatively corrugated heads. Perhaps they are attributable to Alfonso Parigi the Elder's work in the villa 1575, who was engaged by Cerreto Guidi at the Medici villa with Buontalenti during the same period.

A door at the same level leads to Bedroom of the Grand Duchess Bianca, covered with pressed papermaking, imitating the coramas (decorated leather panels) and neo-Renaissance furniture, the result of a complete reconstruction of the 1865 style (non-visitable).

The stone staircase in Pietra serena, connected to the fireplace, connect two upper openings in the same room, which communicate these rooms with the upper level, where today there is the room of King Victor Emmanuel II and where it was probably that of Francesco I.

==== Noble floor (Note: The noble floor is a traditional and typical element of urban noble buildings from the early Renaissance to the nineteenth century.) ====
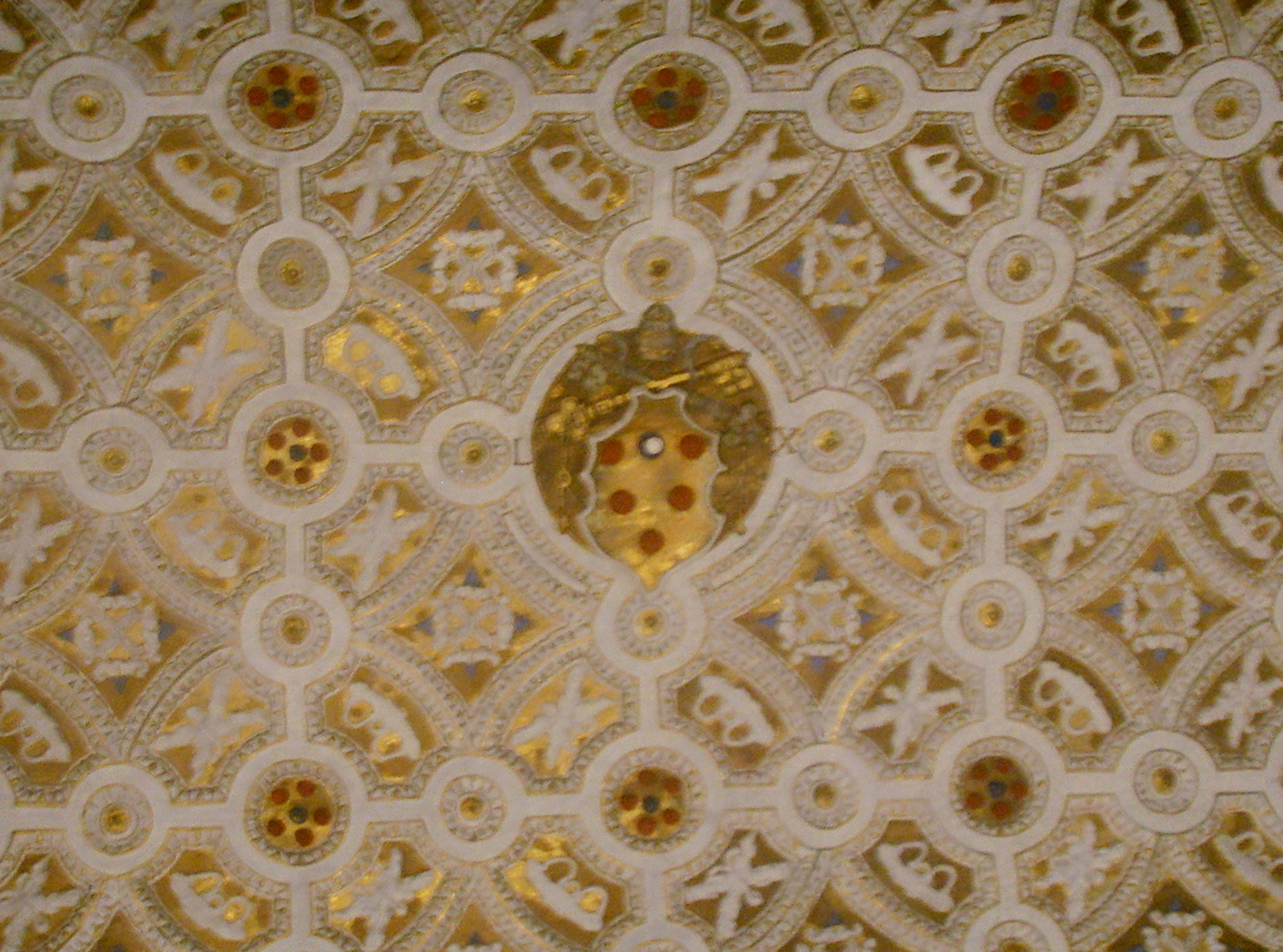
Detail of the ceiling in the Leo X saloon

On the first floor is the most interesting environment of the villa: the Leo X saloon, placed in the middle of the building and finished around 1513. According to Vasari the decoration of the vault belongs only in part to Sangallo, the rest would be the work of Franciabigio and Cosimo Feltrini. Fresco decoration is one of the most important pictorial cycles of the Mannerism period.

On the first floor is the entrance hall (with monochrome paintings of the eighteenth century, by Luigi Catani, reproducing celebratory themes referring to the foundation of the Villa: the scenes depicted are Lorenzo the Magnificent who receives the villa's model from Giuliano da Sangallo and Agnolo Poliziano who crowns with laurel the bust of Homer.

On the ceiling of the so-called Dining Room there is a large fresco, by Anton Domenico Gabbiani, depicting the work of Cosimo The Elder, father of the homeland. The painting dates back to 1698 and was commissioned by Prince Ferdinando III de' Medici. This hall was also known as Salone degli stucchi but the stuccos in question, with portraits of Medici within medallions and other decorations, were removed in 1812 because they were considered too redundant. Only in some periods of the year is decorated the table with the table carp drawings designed by Agnolo Bronzino between the 1533 and 1548, beautifully woven with silk and filaments of gold and silver.

Completing the first floor is Victor Emmanuel II's apartment with four rooms: Cloakroom, Studio, Reception Room and Bedroom, and that of Countess of Mirafiori, Rosa Vercellana, (the "Bella Rosina") consisting of three rooms with antique furniture. The Bella Rosina's room is decorated in particular with a four-poster bed and walls entirely covered with pink silk with floral motifs (1865), radiated draped so as to see a pre-existing neoclassical fresco at the center. The French bath, designed by the court architect Giuseppe Cacialli, was commissioned by Elisa Bonaparte and involved the demolition of some of the older rooms. Today it is well preserved, with its marble basin with carvings and a sculpture of Venus and Love in a niche, in addition to the original toiletries. The two mythological frescoes depict Achilles immersed in the Lete River and Teti attends the departure of Achilles.

In 1807, Pasquale Poccianti designed, in addition to the exterior stairs, the internal staircase connecting the ground floor to the remaining floors of the building, and was also commissioned for some restoration work on the upper floor of the villa. In the same period there are also fresco paintings in some saloons, of a strictly neoclassical style, with subjects drawn from ancient mythology.

==== Renaissance frescos ====
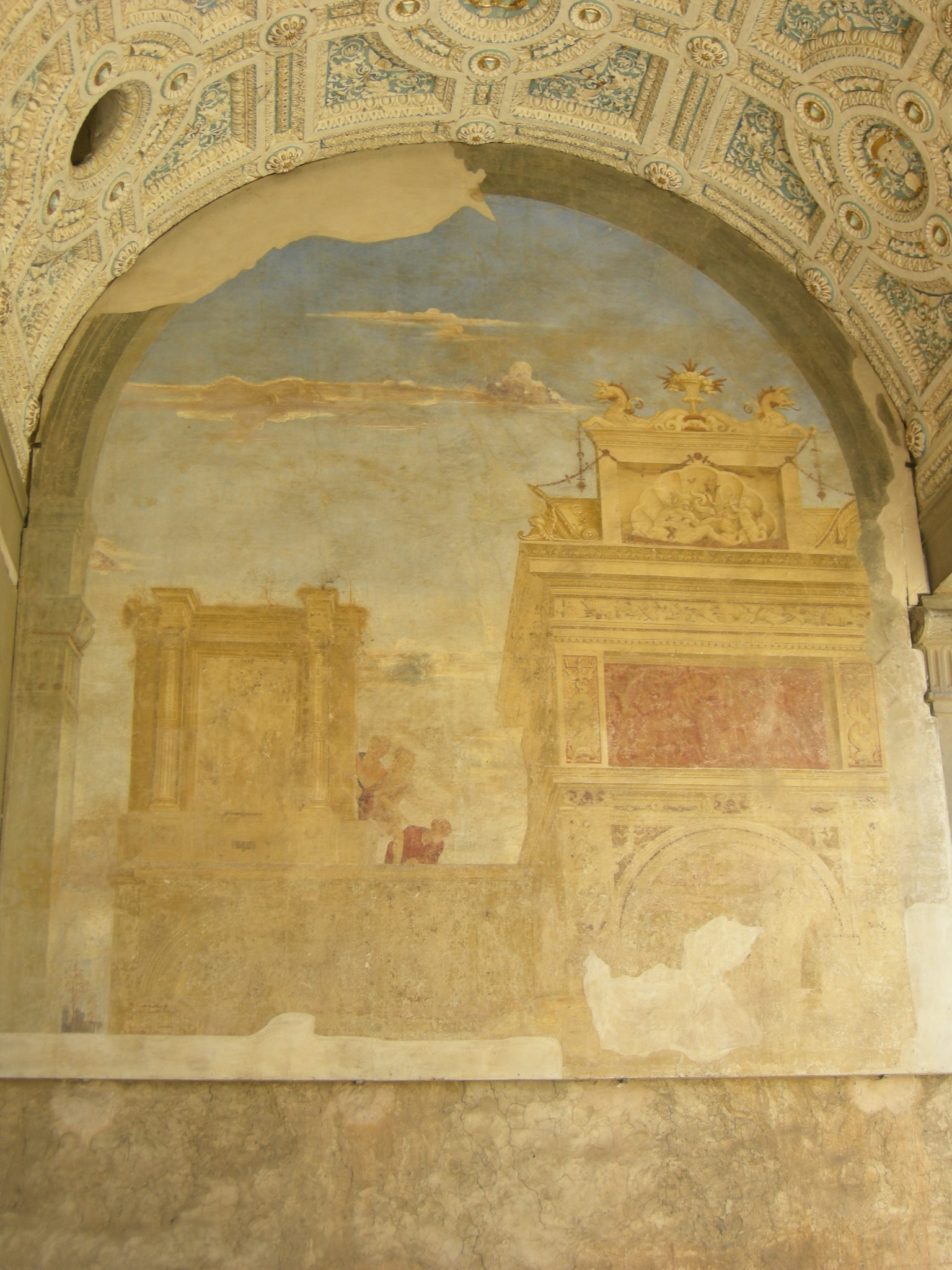
Sacrifice of Laocoön by Filippino Lippi

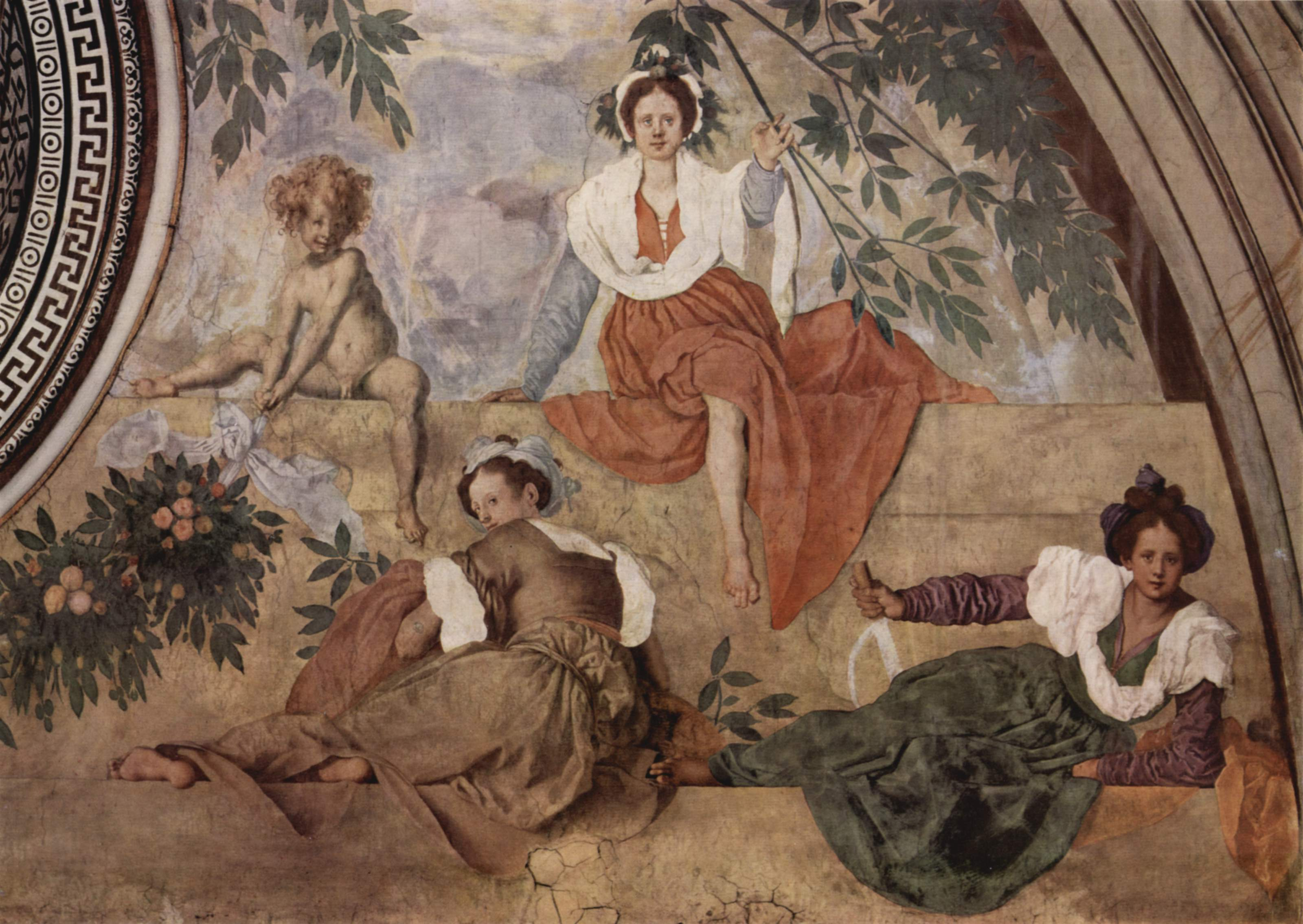
Vertumnus and Pomona by Pontormo

The most ancient fresco of the villa, belonging to the period of Lorenzo the Magnificent, is the so-called Sacrifice of Laocoön (according to Halm's interpretation) by Filippino Lippi, kept under the loggia at the first floor, once detached for restoration and now relocated, though it is rather faded by weather. The fresco is quoted by Vasari as "A sacrifice, fresh, in a loggia that remained imperfect" and which would go back to before Lorenzo's death, or in any case completed by 1494. (Note: The Sacrifice of Laocoön should not be confused with the Laocoön Group in the Vatican Museums, which attracted so much attention in the Italian courts, but which was found only in 1506.)

The dominant theme of the first constructive phase Was the interpretation of the ancient in modern and decorative style and this fresco testifies to the kernel, as well as the frieze of the tympanum, maybe of Andrea Sansovino and the first decorated lunette in the salon of Leo X, that of Pontormo. Between 1519 and 1521, Depicts the Roman deities of Vertumnus and Pomona embedded in an unusual classical landscape.

Afterwards, the theme of decoration changed, probably due to the arrival in the house of the first noble titles of Lorenzo de' Medici, Duke of Urbino and Giuliano de' Medici, Duke of Nemours, and became the illustrations of the glories of the Medici family, to which they clearly mentions the official themes of the paintings, that is, the Stories of Roman History.

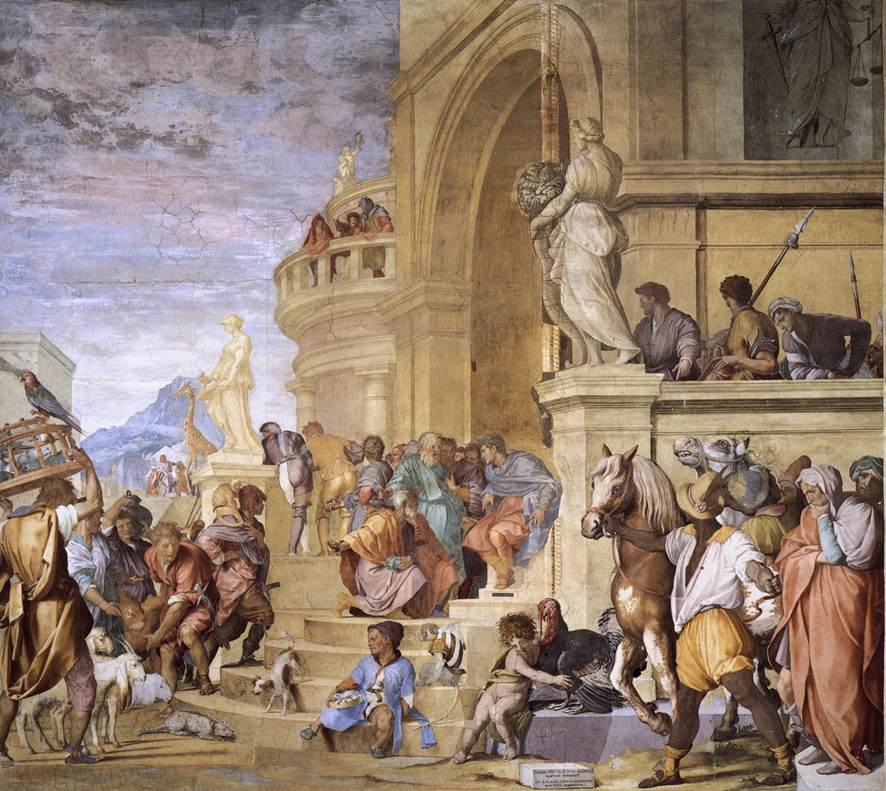
Tribute to Caesar by Andrea del Sarto

Between 1519 and 1521 Andrea del Sarto worked at the villa, painting the Tribute to Caesar, an allusion to the gifts received by Lorenzo the Magnificent from the Sultan of Egypt in 1487. The fresco finished about one-third of the surface of the wall where nearer to the outer wall there was a large column painted in the wall, which was later removed and the fresco painted by Alessandro Allori, who appointed his signature with that of Andrea del Sarto near the boy with the turkey in the foreground. By the time the frame of the primitive fresco was re-emerged, cutting the scene in two, but was again hidden by recent restorations.

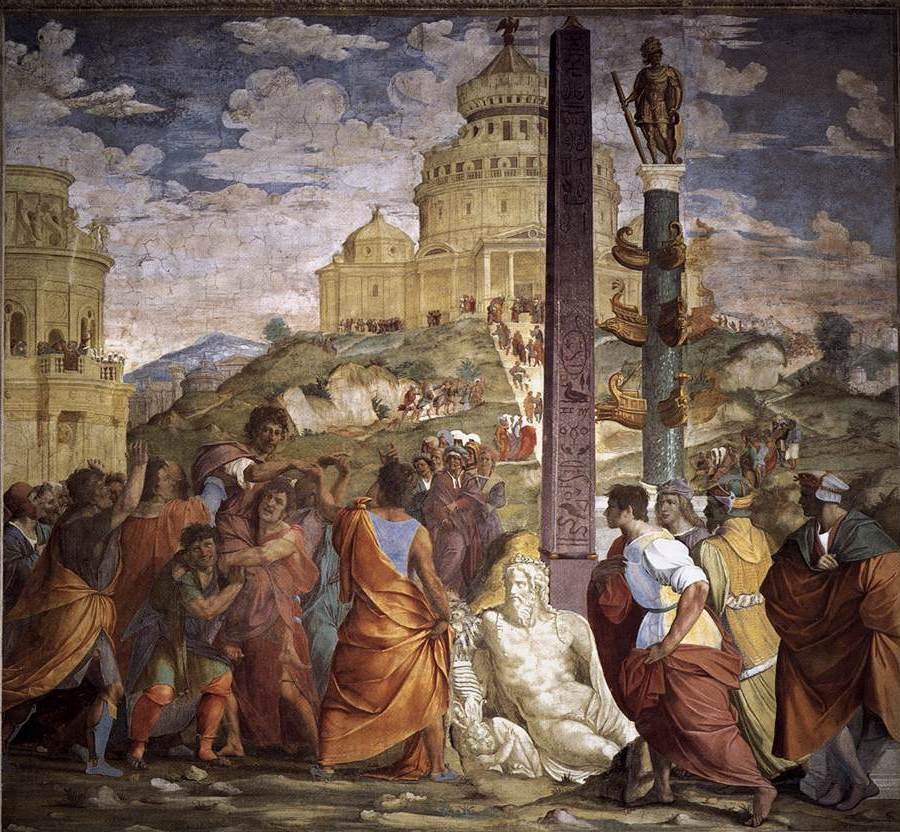
Triumph of Cicero by Franciabigio

More or less at the same time the Franciabigio realized in the wall diagonally opposite the Return of Cicero From Exile, a clear metaphor of Cosimo the Elder and his expulsion with the subsequent triumphal return to Florence. This fresco is dominated at the top by fantastic architectures featured in a rich landscape in aerial perspective. This scene was also enlarged by Aldi, and the original border is hidden from the porphyry obelisk that rises unusually close to the center of the representation to the top of the painting. The painted column was partly preserved in the fresco, in fact, the Allori inserted it beside the obelisk. Allori added figures to both frescoes that he copied from both Andrea del Sarto's and Franciabigio's frescoes in the Chiostro dello Scalzo, Florence.

Alessandro Allori was the one who integrated the earlier paintings and completed the decorative program of the saloon, and worked there between 1578 And 1582, more than fifty years after the commencement of the decorations of the other painters. He was commissioned by Francesco I de' Medici, who lived in the villa in particular with the Venetian noblewoman Bianca Cappello. In addition to expanding the existing panels, he created two new ones: Numidia's Syphace Receiving Scipione, alluding to the journey Lorenzo the Magnificent made to Naples to treat with Ferdinand I of Naples; The Consul Flaminio speaks to the council of the Achaeans, in which he refers to the intervention of Lorenzo the Magnificent in the Dieta di Cremona.

He also frescoed, with numerous aids, the two boxes above the portals, the second bezel With the Garden of the Hesperides and the space between the lunettes and the windows and the lunettes. The elaborate and fantastic compositions with floral, zoomorphic and anthropomorphic figures are typical of the taste for the whim that is typical of the time.

Altori then created a magnificent architecture throughout the room, which almost contrasts with architecture realities, with figures that seem to be carved in their strong and crystalline colors typical of manierism, creating a magnificent and virtuoso scenery.

Completed the pictorial decoration a superb series of tapestries wanted by Cosimo I and his son Francesco, drawing on Stradano before, and Allori then. There were numerous hunting scenes depicted, taking the inspiration from the real jumps that were held in the huge park around the villa (far bigger than today). However, it is not possible to admire them as a whole because the collection is now dispersed among some Florentine museums, deposits and embassies abroad.

==== Second floor ====
On the second floor, the "Museum of Still Life" is set up, which is unique in its kind and exhibits about 200 paintings dating from the late sixteenth to the middle of the eighteenth century and coming from the Medici collections. Many of these paintings, up to the opening of the museum, were in the depots of the Polo Museale Fiorentino and other public bodies and thus largely visible to the general public for the first time. In a room there are 'papiers peints' of French manufacture, with an exotic theme of the early nineteenth century. The depicted views are wide-ranging with a line of low horizon and small characters depicting "Les sauvages de la Mer Pacifique" (1804).

==== The frieze room ====
The room is dedicated to two important masterpieces of the Medici era recently restored: the imposing frieze that adorned the façade of the villa and was commissioned by Lorenzo himself, and the precious tapestry of the Hunting Swan, one of 36 tapestries designed by Giorgio Vasari on commission of Cosimo I, especially for the Villa. Finally, though temporarily, the room is embellished with the 17th century painting of a family tree of the Medici family.

== Buildings adjacent to the Villa and Gardens ==
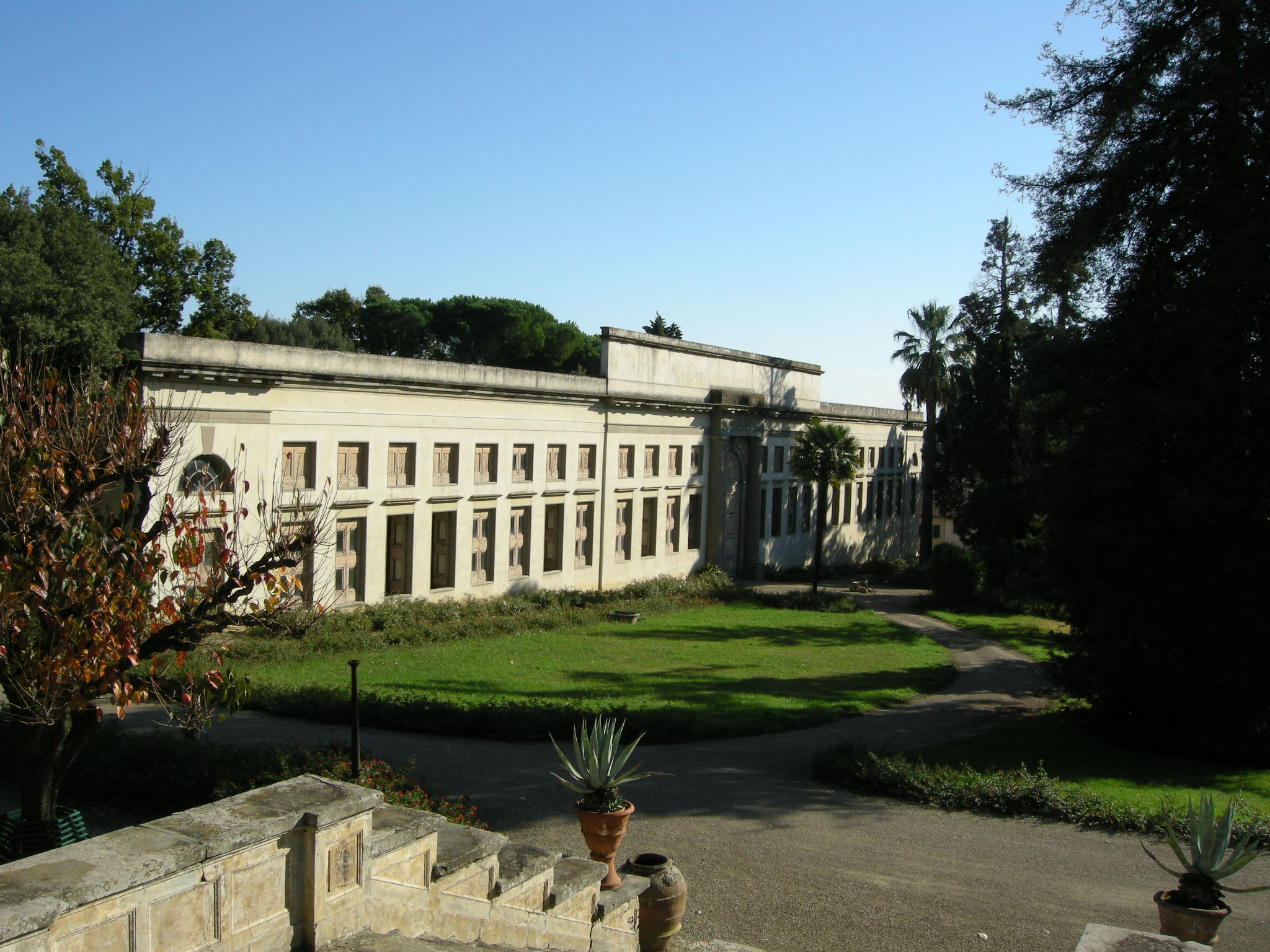
The limonaia

Adjacent to the Villa are some buildings such as the chapel, (where the Pietà con i Santi Cosimo e Damiano, painted in 1560 Giorgio Vasari, waiting for restoration), housed on the ground floor of the south-east bastion; the Cucinone built at the beginning of the 17th century and the neoclassical cellar (or limonaia) "with anchored water retention", the work of Pasquale Poccianti (1825). The Hall of the Pallacorda is a building at the corner of the garden, which dates back to the late eighteenth century to practice this game, and today houses the concierge and a store.

In the middle of the sixteenth century, under Cosimo I, Niccolò Tribolo rearranged the gardens and finished the construction of the stables (Note: Recent studies have denied the design of the stables to architect Nanni di Baccio Bigio, attributing to Tribolo both the project and the execution of the magnificent building.) (1548). The overall view of the garden and the stables after the Tribolo's intervention is in the famous lunette of Giusto Utens (1599) kept in Florence Museum.

== The Gardens ==
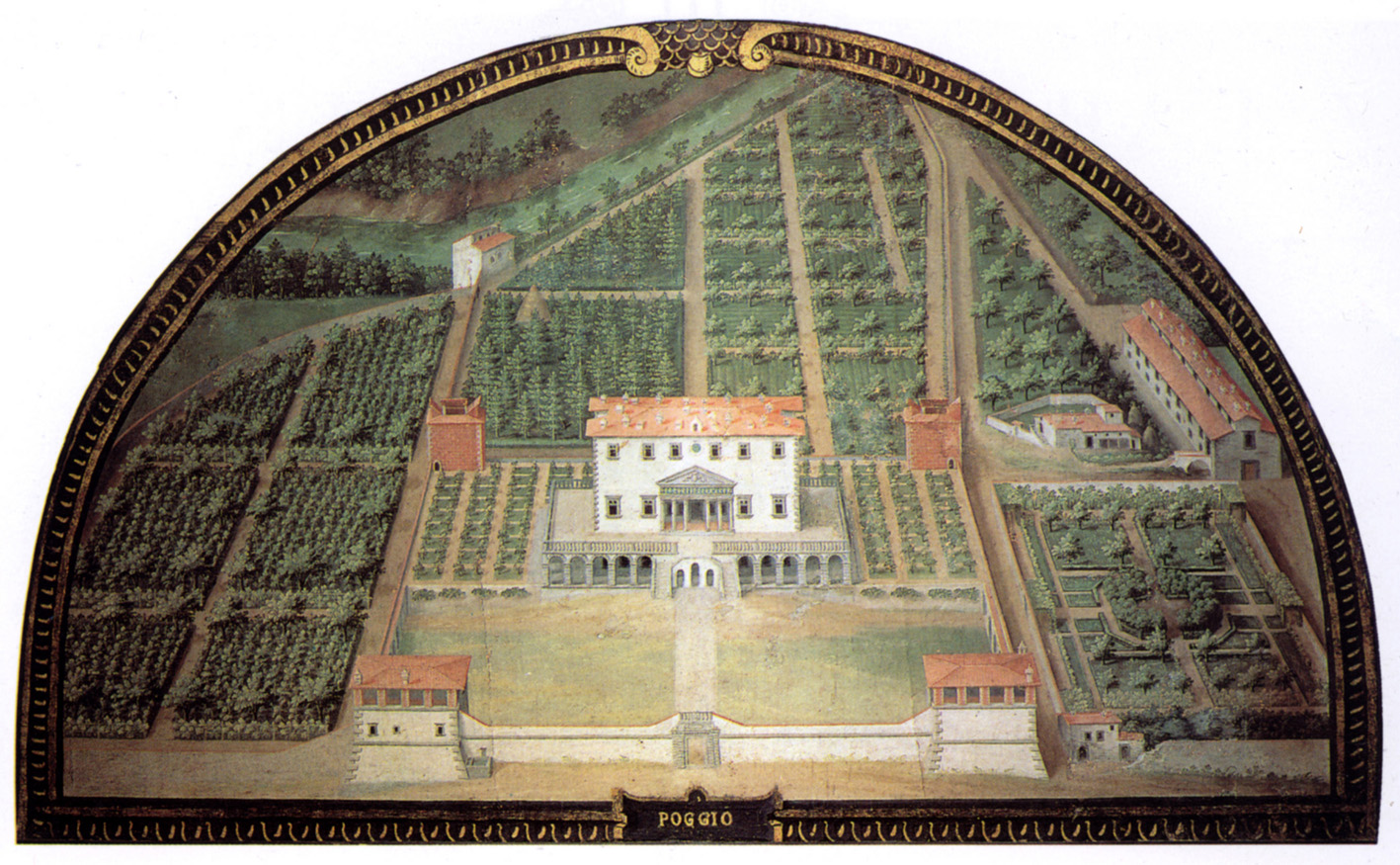
The villa in 1599, Lunetta of Giusto Utens

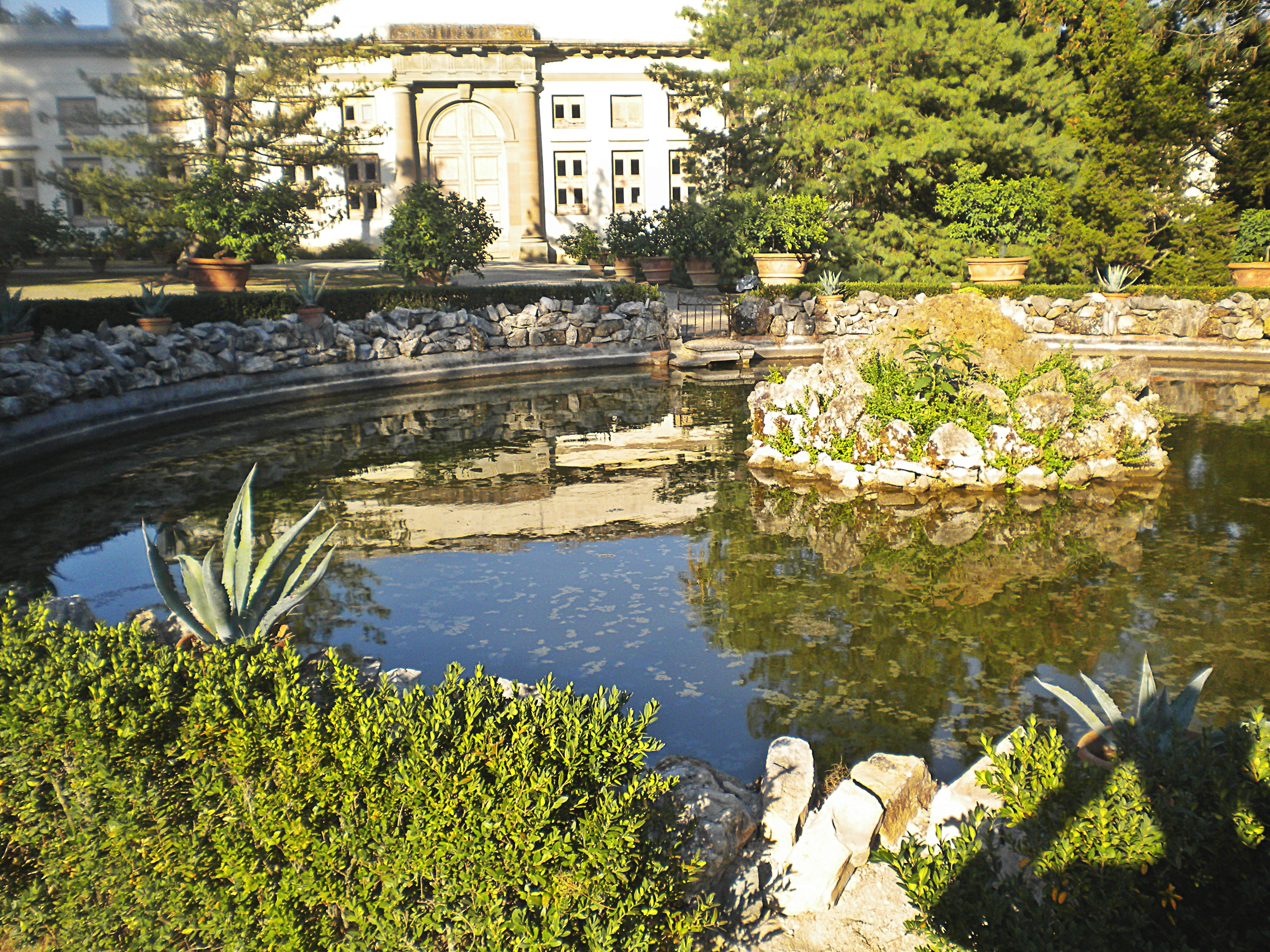
The fountain at the center of the Italian garden

The gardens around the villa date back to the nineteenth century and are very interesting.

Up until the 17th century, the villa's garden was quite simple compared to those of Castello or Petraia: garden areas and wooded areas with an Italian garden on the right, all without fountains and sculptural decorations, as appears from the painting of Giusto Utens. In the eighteenth century some areas of the garden were restored, extending the hunting ground, the so-called 'phagianaia'. In the Italian garden area, a fountain is placed in the center instead of a grove of trees, fed by a new water tank.

In 1813 Louis-Martin Berthault noted the desolation of the square in front of the villa and proposed to remedy the fact that the various highlights of the park, which would be vast, are actually isolated From the other: the villa and the backyard are adjacent, but the Italian garden is cut off from the road to Prato and Barco mediceo di Bonistallo (not to be confused with the much bigger "Barco Reale" placed on the Montalbano ridge), a hunting forest that still rises on the hill in front of the villa to the church of San Francesco, from the road to Pistoia; The "Pavoniere", in addition to the Cascine and still existing ones, are separated from the Ombrone river.

In order to remedy these disadvantages several steps were taken: the road to Prato was rerouted, the numerous walls that separated the seating areas and unified in one fence were cut down, while on the square of the villa were made some serpentine driveways with various vegetable decoration; The Ombrone course was straightened and a new ironable bridge was built to connect with Cascine di Tavola and Pavoniere. The garden thus came to be an irregular shape. The kitchens, the watercourse and the chapel were hidden by new tree groups.

== Exhibitions ==
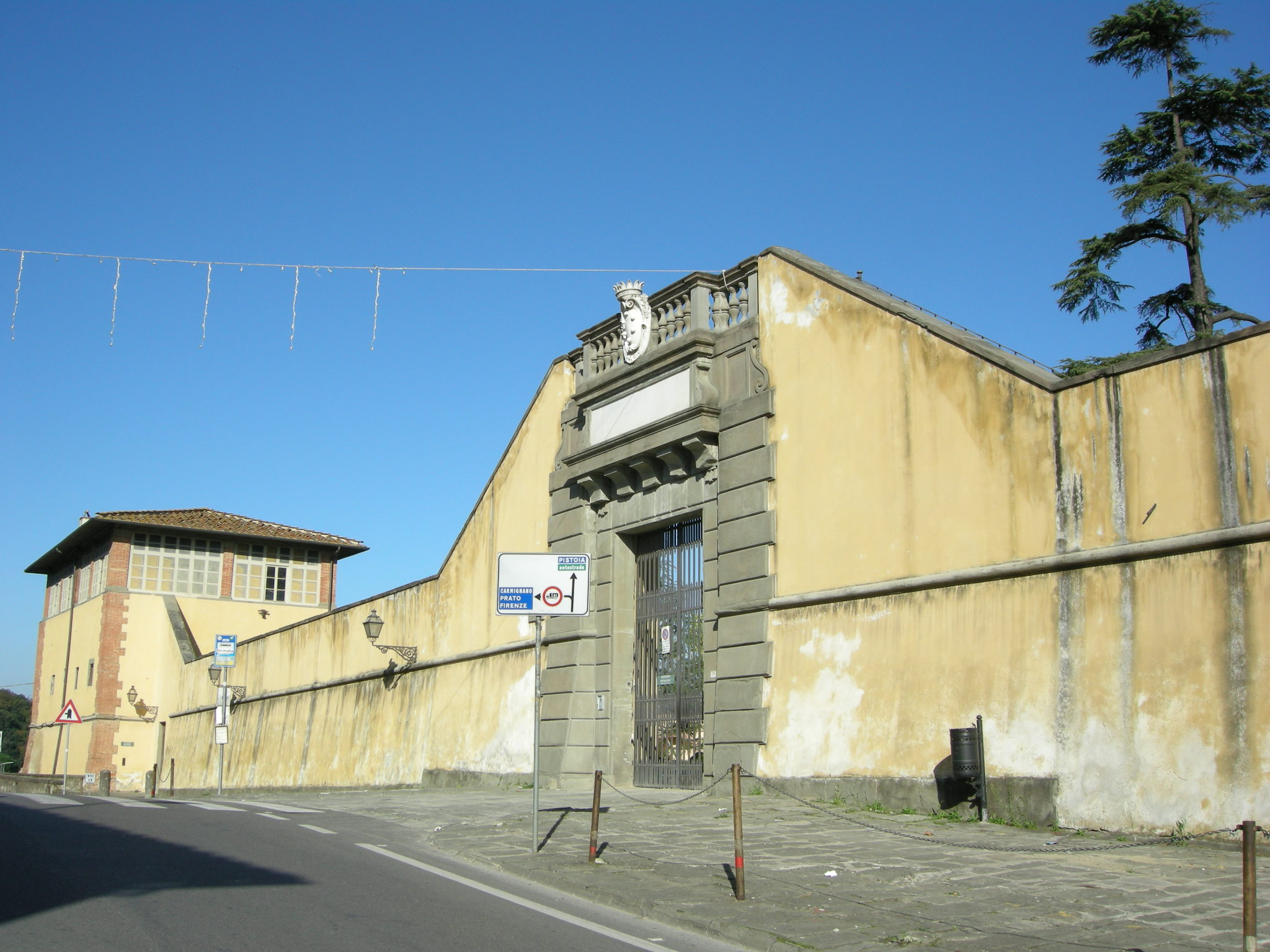
The entrance and guardhouse

- In the summer of 2009 the villa welcomed the works of Helene Brandt and Donatella Mei who pay tribute to Isabella de' Medici
- La Hunting was the theme of the exhibition that was held at the villa where a series of tapestries were taken by Cosimo I and performed by Giovanni Stradano and Francesco Allori. The center of interest was represented by the tapestries depicting "The Wild Goose Hunt" and "The Swan Hunt".

== See also ==
- Medici villas

== Bibliography ==
- Isabella Lapi Ballerini, The Medici Villas. Complete Guide, Giunti 2003.
- Giardini di Toscana, Edifir, Florence 2001
- La Villa medicea di Poggio a Caiano [The Medici villa at Poggio a Caiano], Sillabe, Livorno 2000.
- Mignani Daniela, The Medici Villas of Giusto Utens, Arnaud, 1993
- Medri Litta Maria, The Myth of Lorenzo the Magnificent in the Villa Decorations of Poggio a Caiano, Editions Medicea, Florence 1992.
- Foster Philip Ellis, The Villa of Lorenzo de' Medici in Poggio a Caiano, Poggio a Caiano, Poggio a Caiano 1992.
- Marchi Annalisa, edited by, Laurenziani Itineraries: from the Villa of Cafaggiolo to the Villa of Poggio a Caiano through the Prese area, Giunti, Prato, 1992.
- The Villa of Poggio a Caiano (Library of "Lo Studiolo"), Becossi Editore, Florence 1986.
- Agriesti Luciano, Memory, Landscape, Project: The Cascine of Tavola and the Medici Villa of Poggio a Caiano from the historical use of resources, Trevi, Rome 1982.
- Bardazzi Silvestro, The Medici Villa of Poggio a Caiano, Prato Savings Bank and Deposit, Prato 1981.
- Gurrieri Francesco, The Stables of Villa Medicea of Poggio a Caiano, Autonomous Tourism Company, Prato 1980.
- Borea Evelina, edited by, La Quadreria di Don Lorenzo de' Medici: Villa Medicea di Poggio a Caiano, Centro Di, Florence 1977.
- Elisabetta Pieri, Luigi Zangheri, edited by, Niccolò called the Tribe of Art, Architecture and Landscape, Acts of the Conferential Study for the Centenary of Birth, Municipality of Poggio a Caiano, 2000.
- Pierluigi De Vecchi and Elda Cerchiari, The Times of Art, Volume 2, Bompiani, Milan 1999. ISBN 88-451-7212-0
- Silvia Guagliumi, "Giuliano da San Gallo architettore", Tau Ed.

Todi 2016.

== See also ==
- Poggio a Caiano
- Pope Leo X
- Francesco I de' Medici
- Rosa Vercellana
