= Palazzo Guadagni Strozzi Sacrati =

Italian palace

Coordinates: 43°46′22″N 11°15′30″E

The Palazzo Guadagni Strozzi Sacrati is a palace located between via dell’Oriuolo, via de’ Servi, and via Bufalini in central Florence, region of Tuscany, Italy.

== History ==
The original structure was commissioned in 1604 by Alessandro and Vincenzo Guadagni, on properties they had purchased from the Buondelmonti family. The aristocratic Guadagni family would include the Cardinal Giovanni Antonio Guadagni (1674 – 1759). The façade is attributed to the designs of Gherardo Silvani. The Senator Filippo Maria Guadagni refurbished the palace between 1730 and 1770, creating the monumental staircase, and embellishing the ball-room with stucco ornamentation. The palace was frescoed by Antonio Vannetti, Sigismondo Betti, and Anton Domenico Giarré. The next owner, Anna Riccardi, born to the Strozzi family, created the gardens, and continued decoration of the piano nobile with a team of painters including Luigi Catani, Antonio Fedi, Gasparo Martellini, Angiolo Angiolini and Niccolò Contestabile.

In 1860-1862, the palace was enlarged with interventions of the architects Felice Francolini and later Gaetano Baccani. They installed the coat of arms of the Riccardi-Strozzi, now in the interior courtyard. At the death of the Marquese Carlo in 1871; the palace passed on to Massimiliano Strozzi Sacrati of Mantua. The last private proprietors were Guendalina Stuart and her son, Marchese Uberto Sacrati Strozzi. Upon Uberto's death in 1892, the palace was acquired in 1988 by the Regione Toscana to house the President of the Regional Council of the Region of Tuscany.
