= Antonio Vannetti =

Italian painter and architect

Antonio Vannetti (1663-1733) was an Italian painter and architect, active in the Grand Duchy of Tuscany, and specializing in perspective (quadratura) painting. He was born in Siena. He painted for the Palazzo Vivarelli in Siena, where he painted with his mentor Giuseppe Nicola Nasoni, as well as with Nasini's son, Niccolo. He painted in the Palazzo Strozzi Sacrati in Florence, contemporaneously with Sigismondo Betti and Anton Domenico Giarré.
