= Tribute to Caesar (del Sarto and Allori) =

1520 painting by Andrea del Sarto and Alessandro Allori

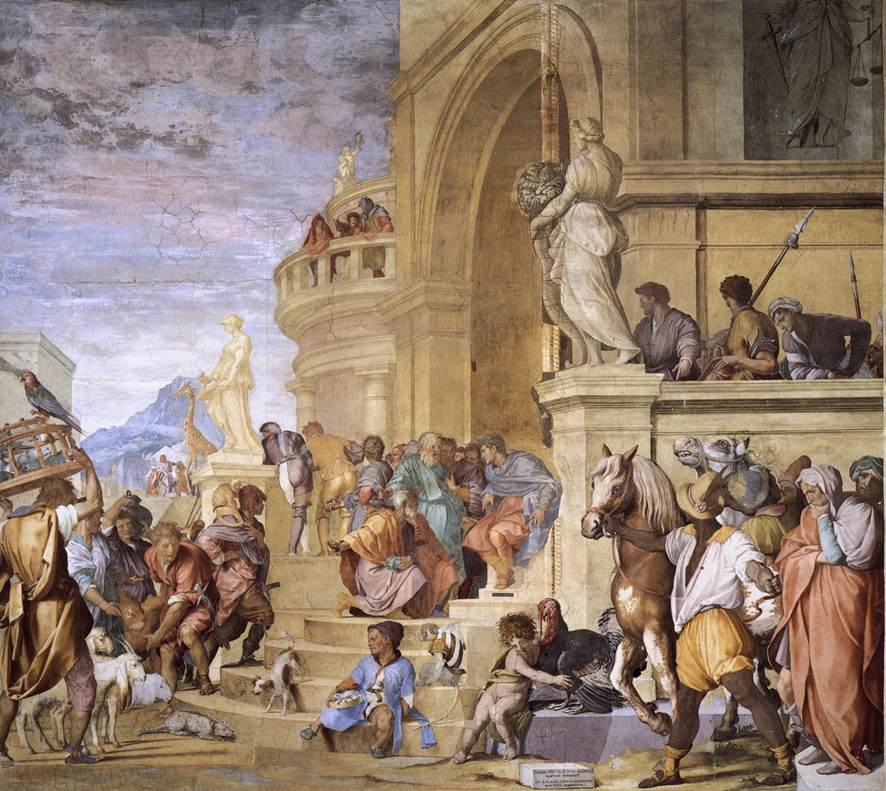
Tribute to Caesar

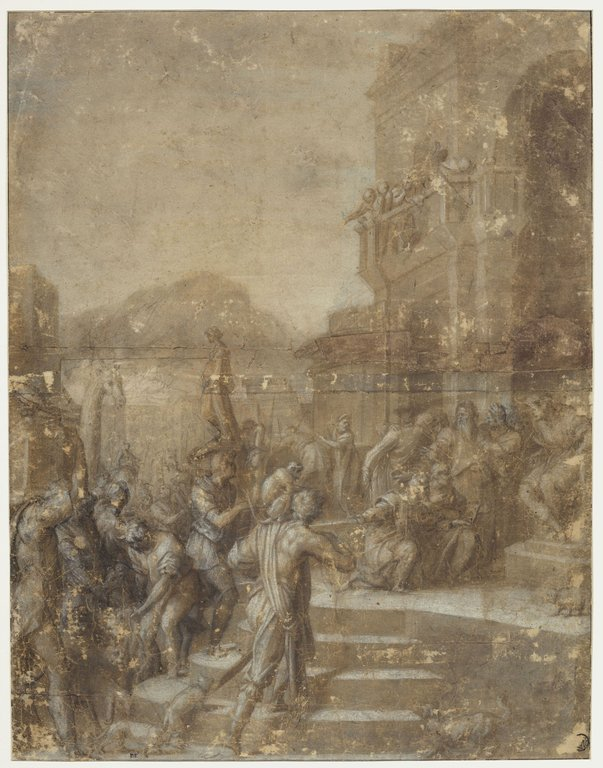
Preparatory drawing by Andrea del Sarto for the original composition (Louvre)

Tribute to Caesar is a fresco measuring 502x536 cm by Andrea del Sarto and Alessandro Allori in the central hall of the villa medicea di Poggio a Caiano, Province of Prato, Italy. It dates to circa 1520 (first phase), and 1582 (second phase).

== History ==
The work was commissioned in the 1520s when the villa was being totally redecorated and redesigned. The earliest surviving frescoes in the villa such as the lunette Vertumnus and Pomona by Pontormo, elegiacally evoke rural life, but the building's main theme instead became the glorification of the Medici family after it acquired the titles of Giuliano de' Medici, Duke of Nemours and Lorenzo de' Medici, Duke of Urbino in 1520.

Andrea del Sarto's work shows a laurel-wreathed Julius Caesar receiving ambassadors, with Caesar as a symbol or 'stand-in' for Lorenzo de' Medici. The animals brought by the ambassadors include (left background) the famous Medici giraffe, given to the family in 1487, possibly by Qaitbay, Sultan of Egypt.

The work was originally in a trompe-l'œil loggia enclosed with columns, but by 1575 this scheme had begun to look limiting and other scenes had been added to most of the walls. del Sarto's fresco was thus extended by about a third on its right-hand side in 1582 by Alessandro Allori, from the statue of Abundance to the child with a turkey on the steps. The other statues shown in the work are Judith with the Head of Holofernes (alluding to Donatello's Judith and Holofernes, a symbol of Florentine civic power in the Palazzo Vecchio) and Justice (upper right).

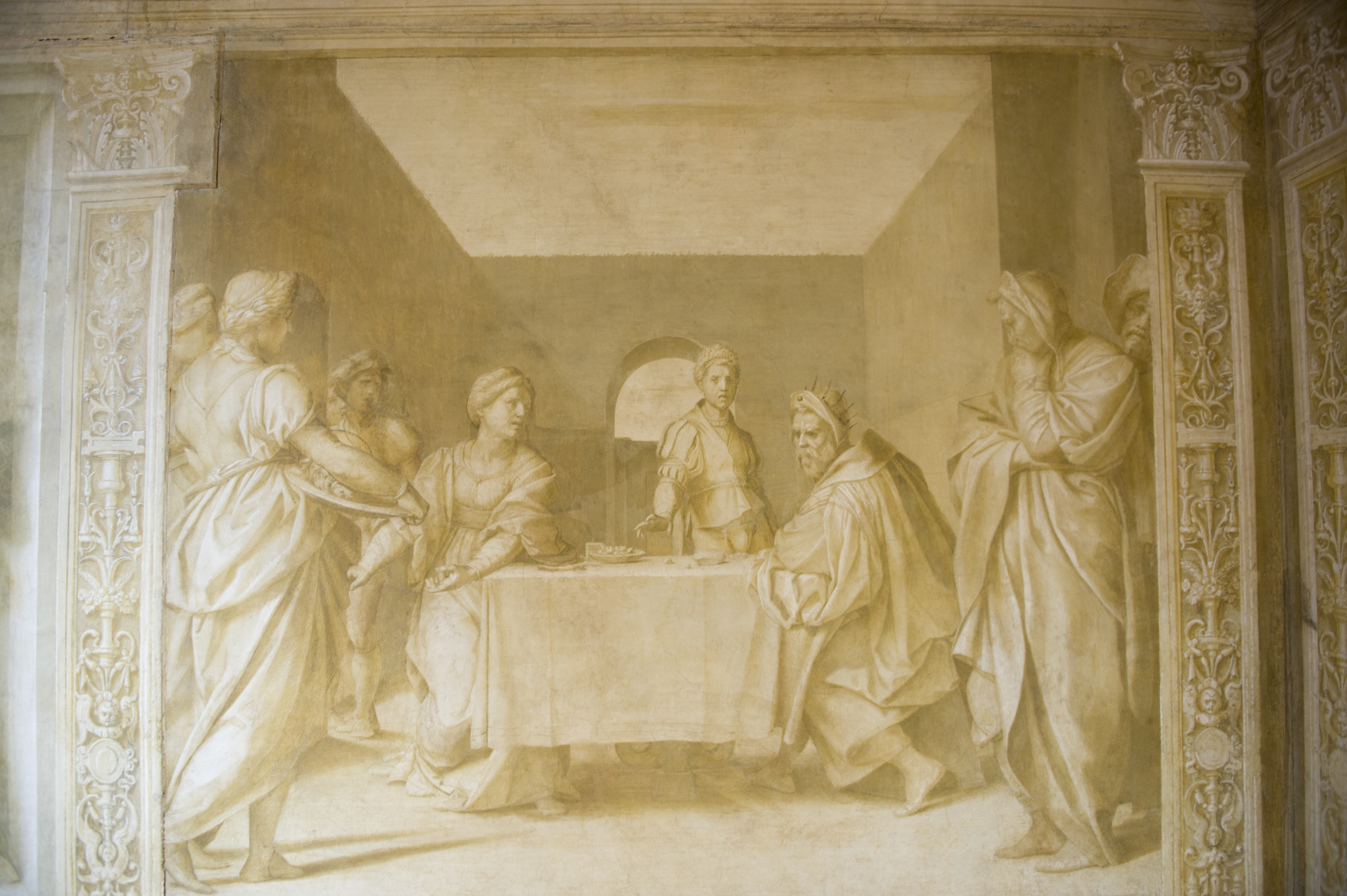
Del Sarto Presentation of the Head of St John, Chiostro dello scalzo. Allori copied both the man on the right and the woman on the left hand side

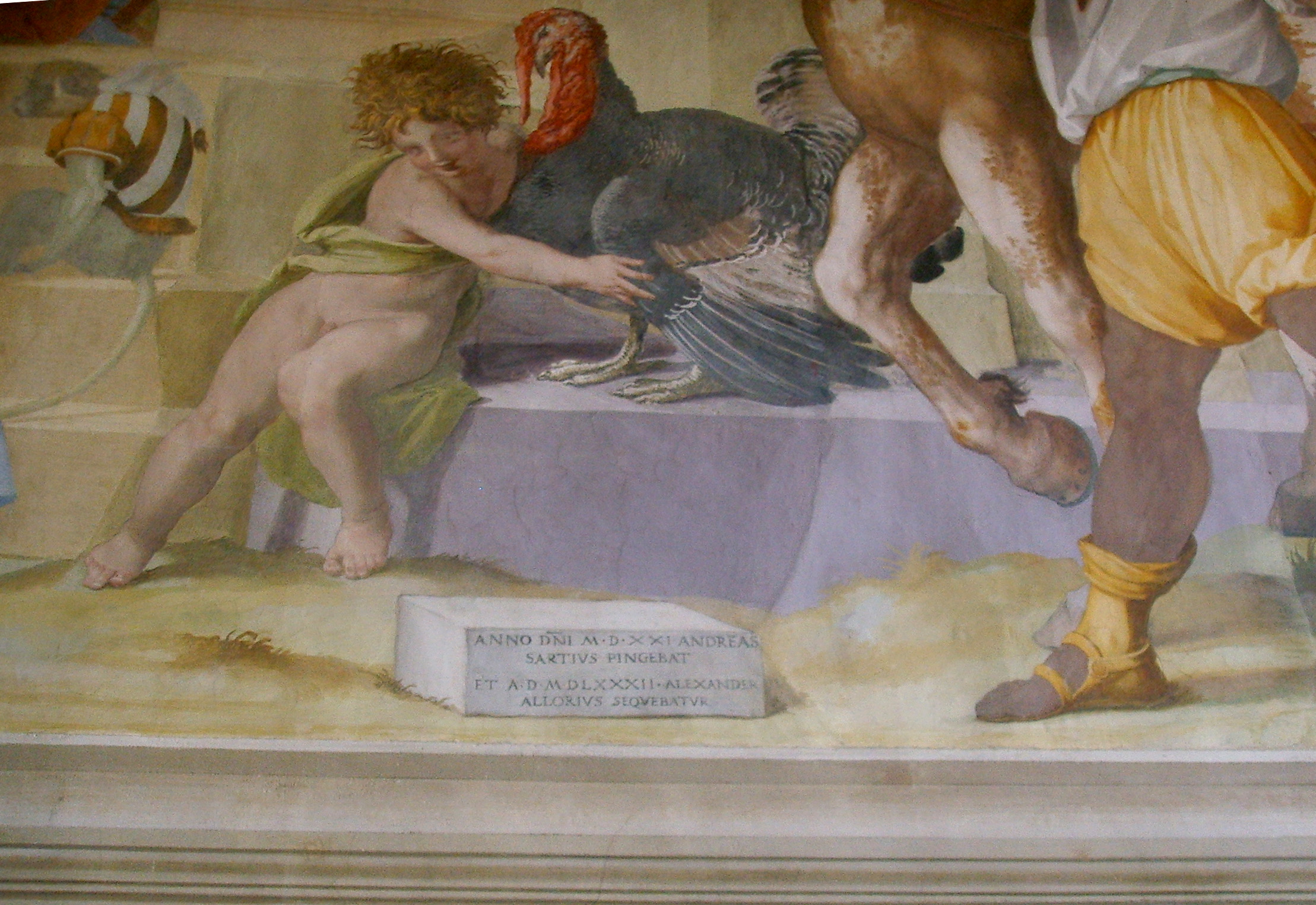
Signature providing a history of the creation of the fresco: ANNO DÑI M.D.XXI ANDREAS SARTIVS PINGEBAT ET A.D.MDLXXXII ALEXANDER ALLORIVS SEQVEBATVR

Allori expanded Del Sarto's fresco, Tribute to Caesar, by adding new figures that he copied from Del Sarto's earlier works in the Chiostro dello Scalzo in Florence. Allori signed the fresco in Latin and gave a history of its creation: Andrea del Sarto painted in 1520 and Allori followed him in 1581.

In the same central hall Allori expanded Franciabigio's fresco Triumph of Cicero in the same way.
