= Triumph of Cicero (Franciabigio and Allori) =

1520 fresco by Franciabigio and additional 1580 fresco painting by Alessandro Allori

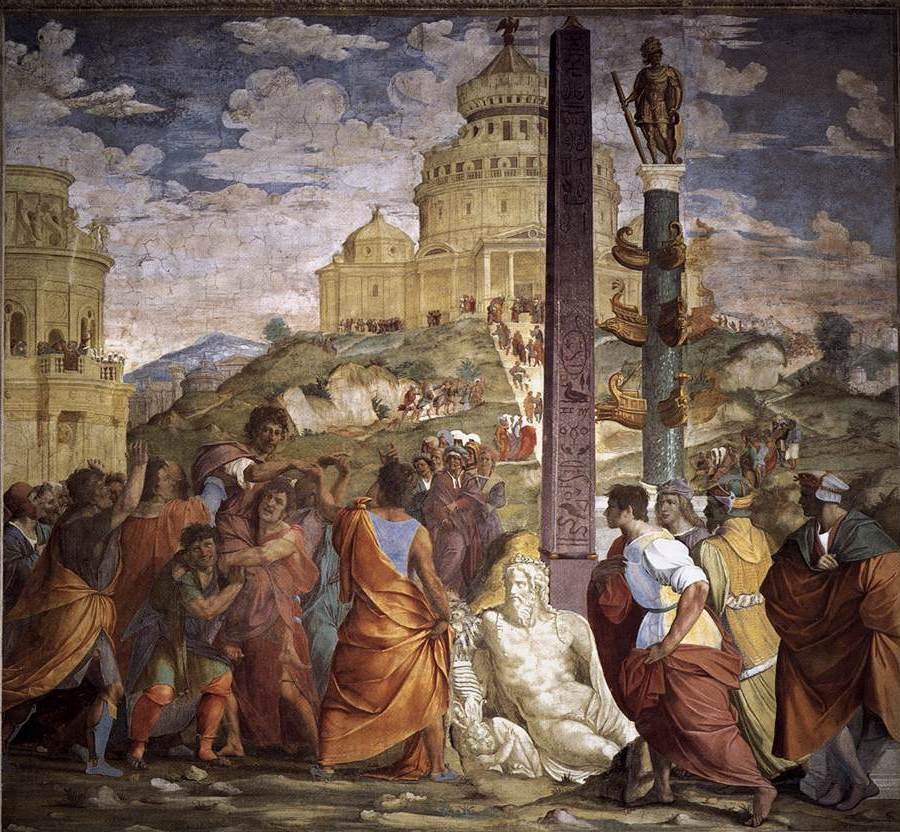
Triumph of Cicero

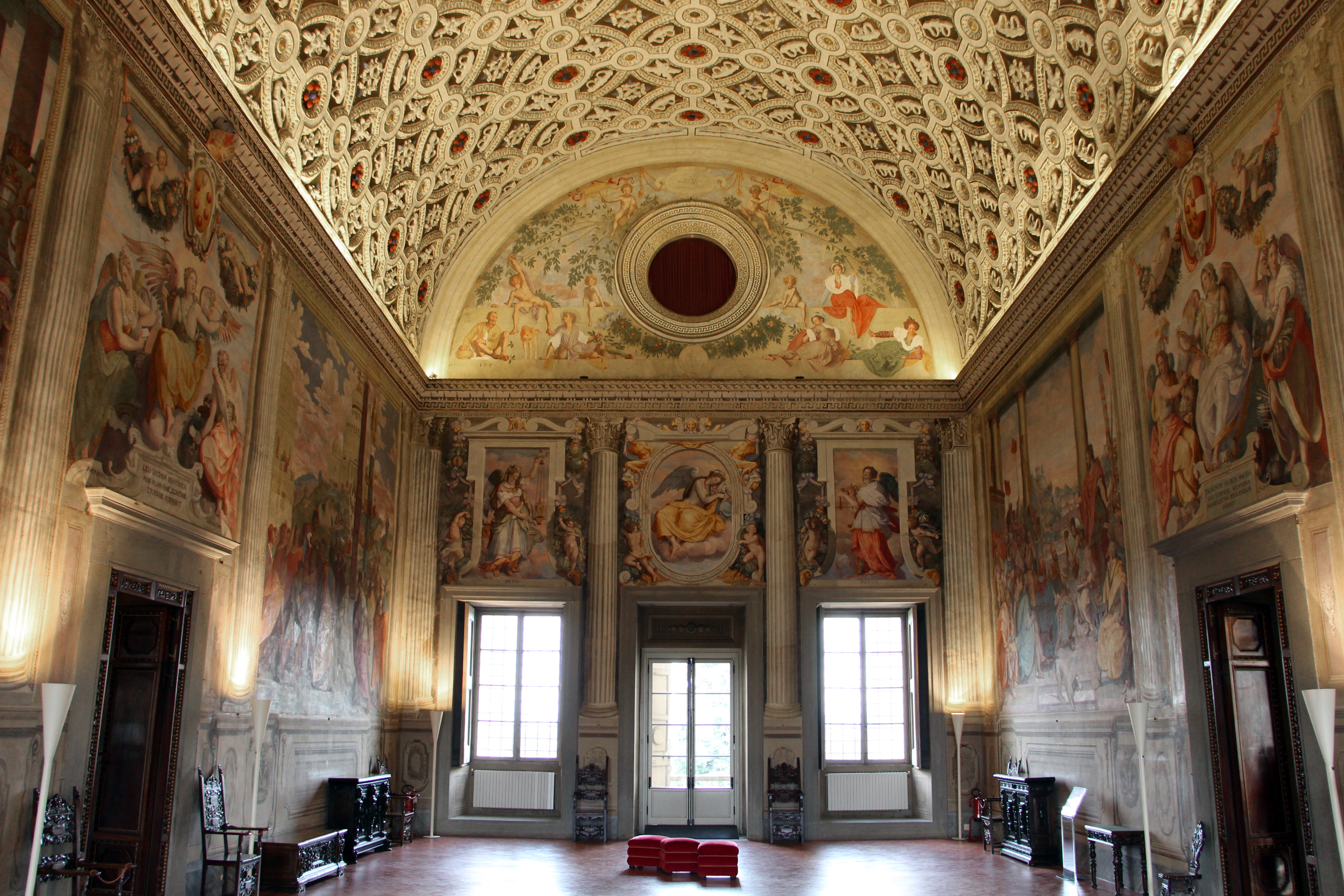
The central hall of villa medicea di Poggio a Caiano

Triumph of Cicero (Il Trionfo di Cicerone) is a fresco measuring approximately 500x540 cm by Franciabigio and Alessandro Allori in the central hall of the villa medicea di Poggio a Caiano, Province of Prato, Italy. It dates to circa 1520 (first phase), and 1582 (second phase).

The work of art depicts a crucial episode in the life of the Roman statesman and orator Marcus Tullius Cicero, who exposed the conspiracy of Catiline, which threatened the stability of the Roman Republic. In the fresco, Cicero is depicted as the savior of the republic, someone who convinced the Senate to intervene and thus prevent a coup d'état. It emphasizes Cicero's role as defender of the rule of law and his victory over the conspirators.

== First phase, 1520s ==
Between 1513 and 1520, after the return of the Medici, the works were completed on the initiative of Pope Leo X. He wanted to pay tribute to his father Lorenzo the Magnificent and other important Medici figures. The decoration of the villa, conceived by historian Paolo Giovio, was intended to glorify the glory of the Medici dynasty through episodes from classical Roman history.

In the Triumph of Cicero, there is a clear parallel with Cosimo de' Medici the Elder, the progenitor of the Medici family. Cosimo was exiled from Florence in 1433 by his political opponents but returned triumphantly in 1434 and re-established his power. This return marked a period of stability and prosperity for Florence, comparable to Cicero's triumphant return to Rome. In Franciabigio's fresco, Cicero is carried in triumph to the Capitol by an enthusiastic crowd, a scene that alludes to Cosimo's exile and glorious return. Both figures are presented as saviors of their respective republics, which provides a clear symbolism for the political message that the Medici family wanted to convey.

== Second phase, 1580s ==
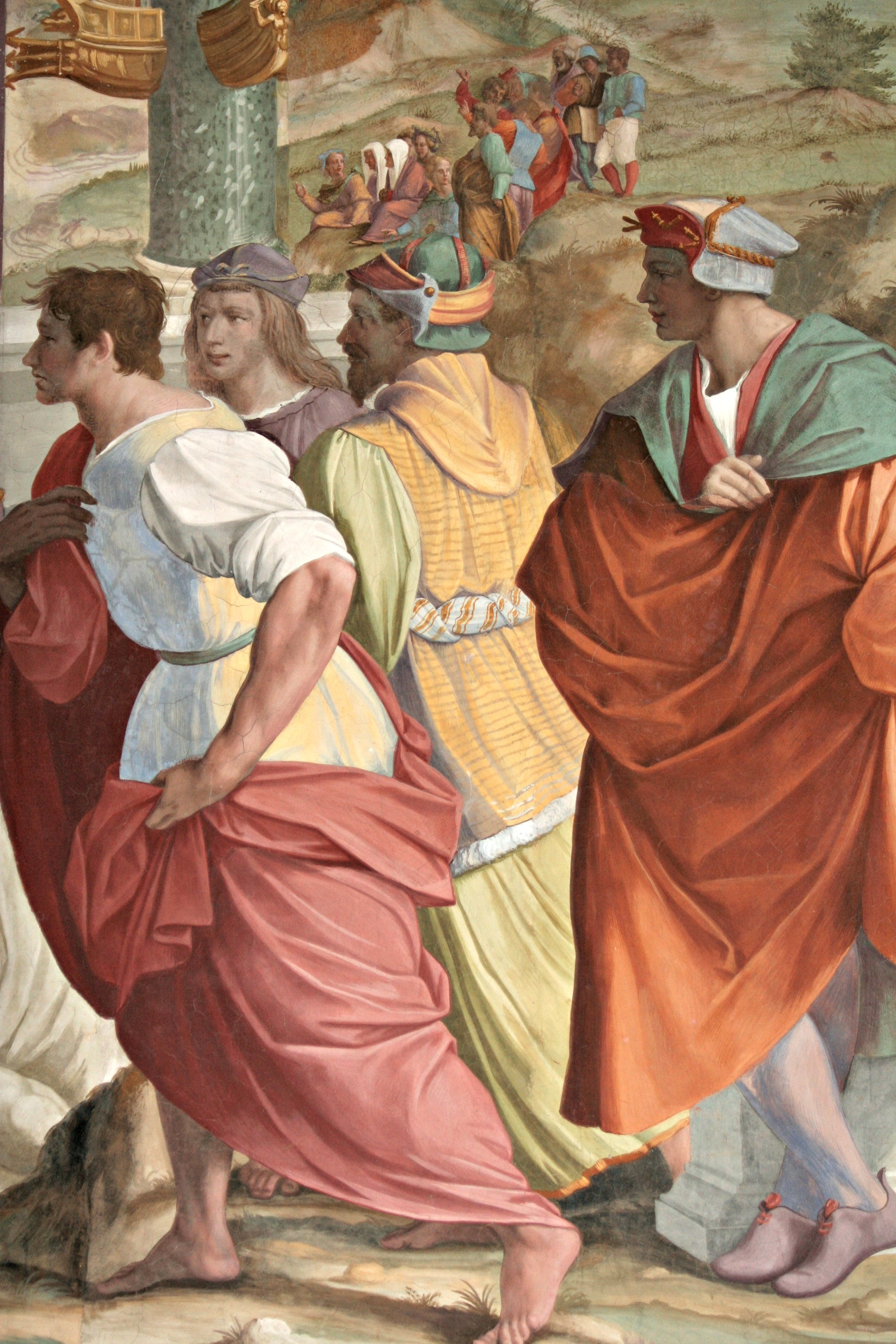
Detail of the fresco - Allori's addition

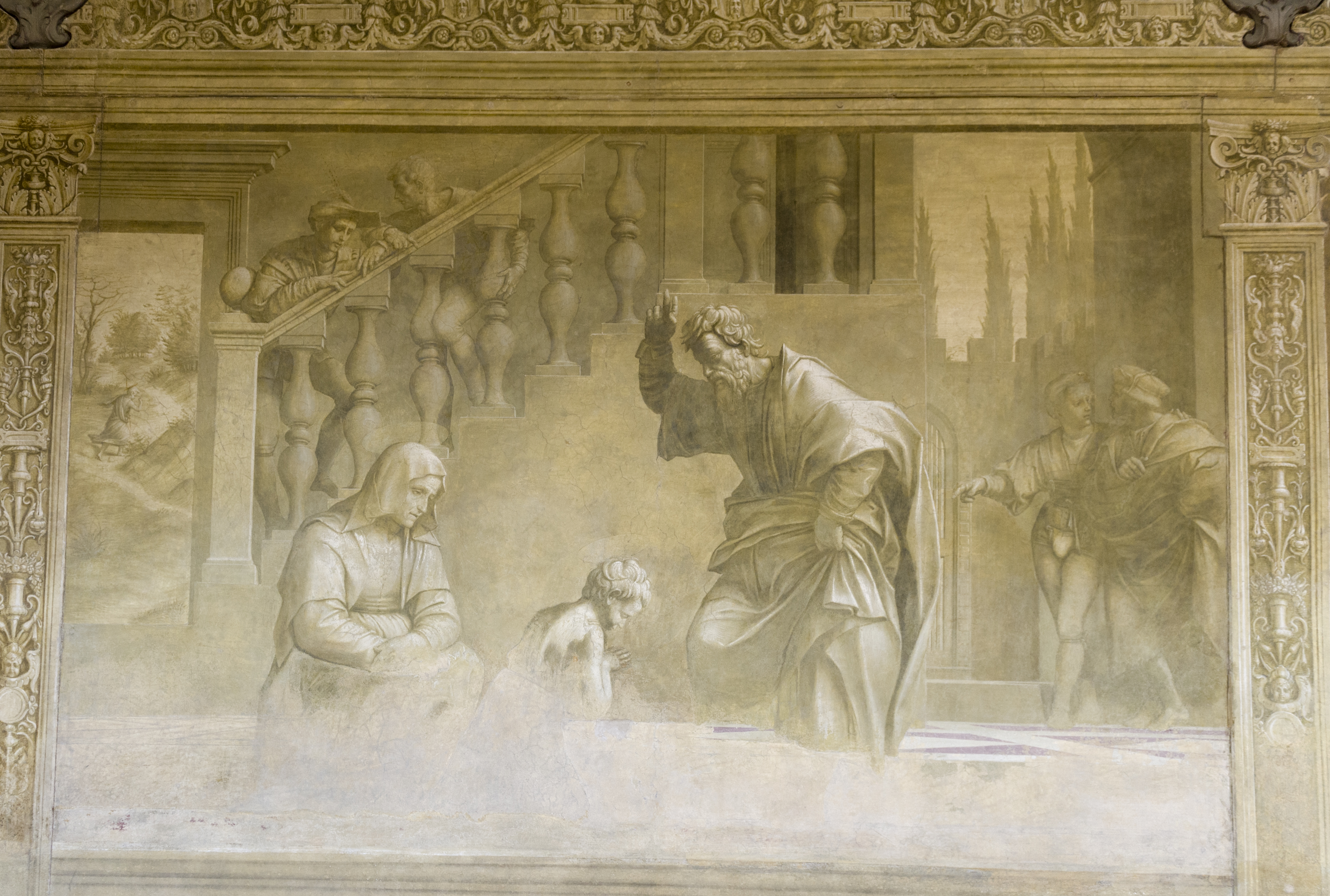
Franciabigio Blessing of the Young St John, Chiostro dello Scalzo. Allori copied the figure in the background on the right

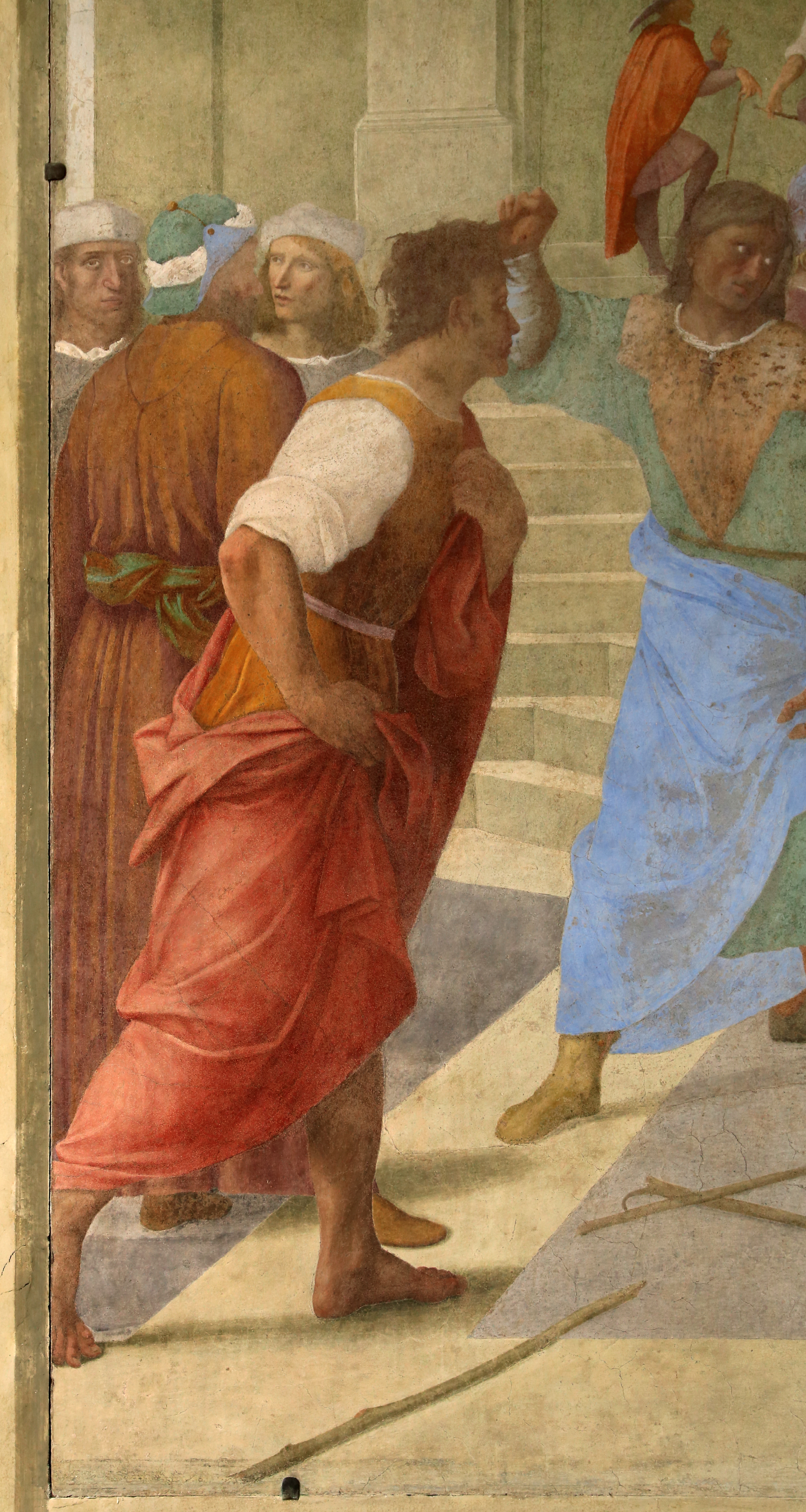
Franciabigio Marriage of the Virgin (1513), Ss. Annuziata

Work on the decoration of the villa was interrupted, however, after the death of Pope Leo X in December 1521. It was not until 1578–1582, under the orders of Grand Duke Francesco de' Medici, that the decoration of the villa was resumed and the frescoes of Del Sarto and Franciabigio were expanded by Alessandro Allori.

Allori expanded Franciabigio's fresco, Triumph of Cicero, by adding new figures that he copied from Franciabigio's earlier works in the Chiostro dello Scalzo and Santissima Annunziata in Florence. His additions, the band with the obelisk and the rostral column, as well as the statue of the river god Tiber and the group of four figures in the right foreground give the fresco greater breadth in keeping with the renewed spatial design. In this way, Allori completed the work begun decades earlier, honoring the classical themes of the Medici and strengthening their legacy in Florence.

In the same great hall Allori expanded Andrea del Sarto's fresco Tribute to Caesar in the same way.
