= Luigi Catani =

Italian painter (1762–1840)

Luigi Catani (7 November 1762 – 17 December 1840) was an Italian painter of frescoes during the neoclassical period, active in Tuscany.

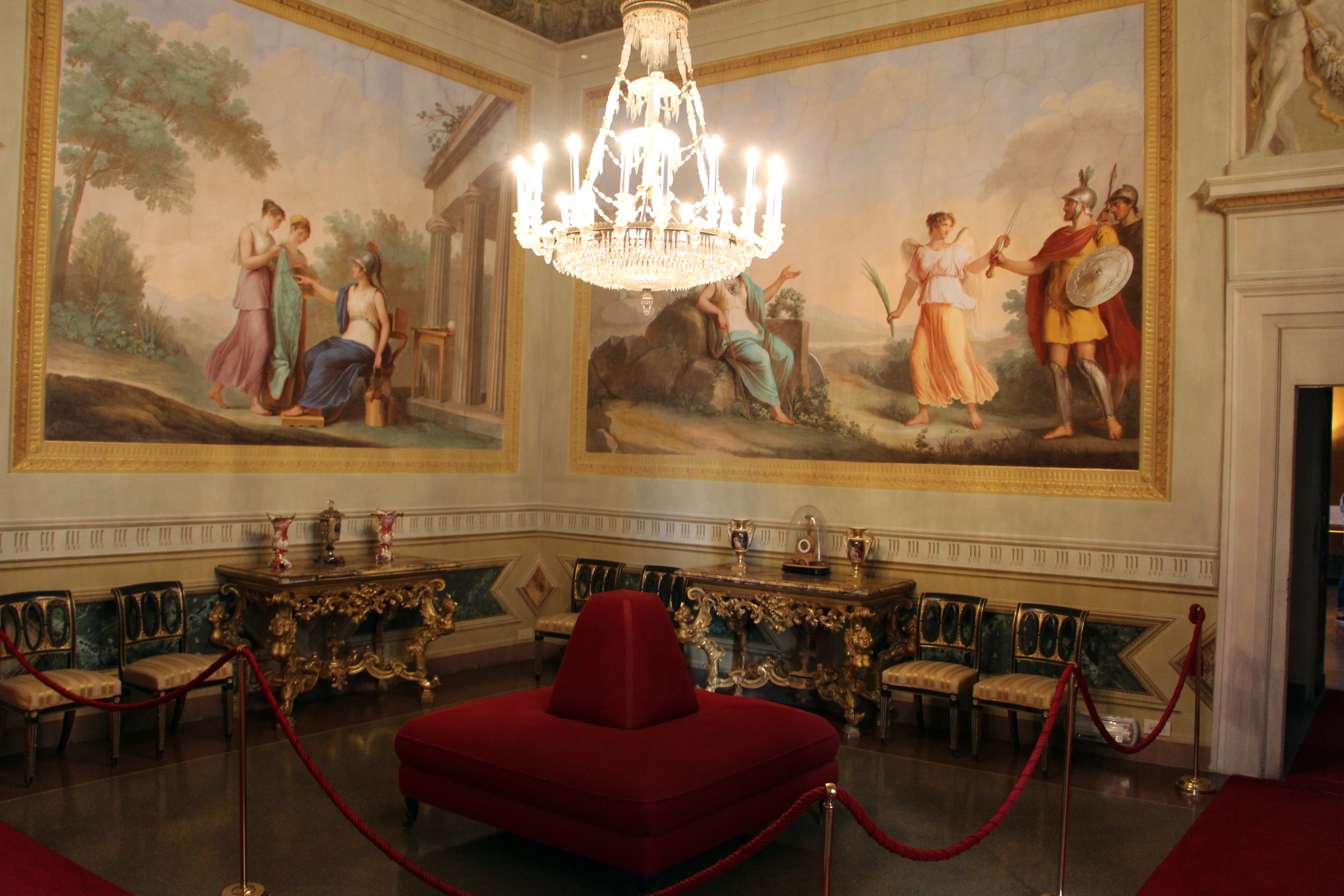
Frescoes in Apartment of Elisa, Countess of Mirafiori

== Biography ==
He was born in Prato and died in Florence. He was a pupil of Pietro Benvenuti. He was employed in the decoration of churches and aristocratic palaces in the duchy, including Palazzo Incontri in Siena, San Niccolò in Prato, the Villa Medicea in Poggio a Caiano, Palazzina dei Servi, Palazzo delle Cento, Palazzo Strozzi Sacrati, Palazzo Venturi Ginori, the Royal Palace of Pisa, and the Bardi chapel in Santa Maria Maddalena de' Pazzi.
