= Sigismondo Betti =

Italian painter

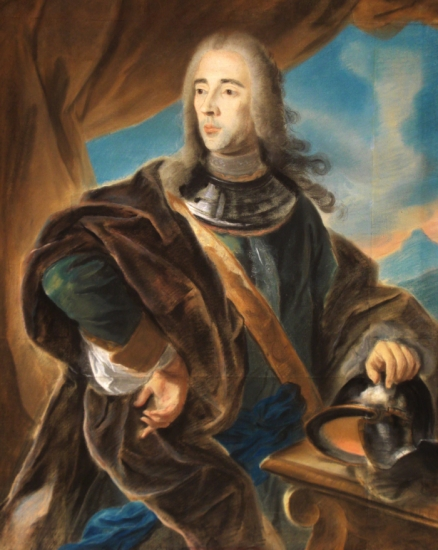
Portrait of Rodolfo Brignole Sale (former Doge of Genoa) by Sigismondo Betti

Sigismondo Betti (January 25, 1700, in Florence – after 1783, in Florence) was an Italian painter.

Betti worked mostly in Genoa and in Liguria. He was a pupil of Antonio Puglieschi and a fresco painter Matteo Bonechi. He initially painted in Tuscany, but moved to Genoa in 1737, and a decade later to Varallo.
