= Franciabigio =

Italian painter (1482–1525)

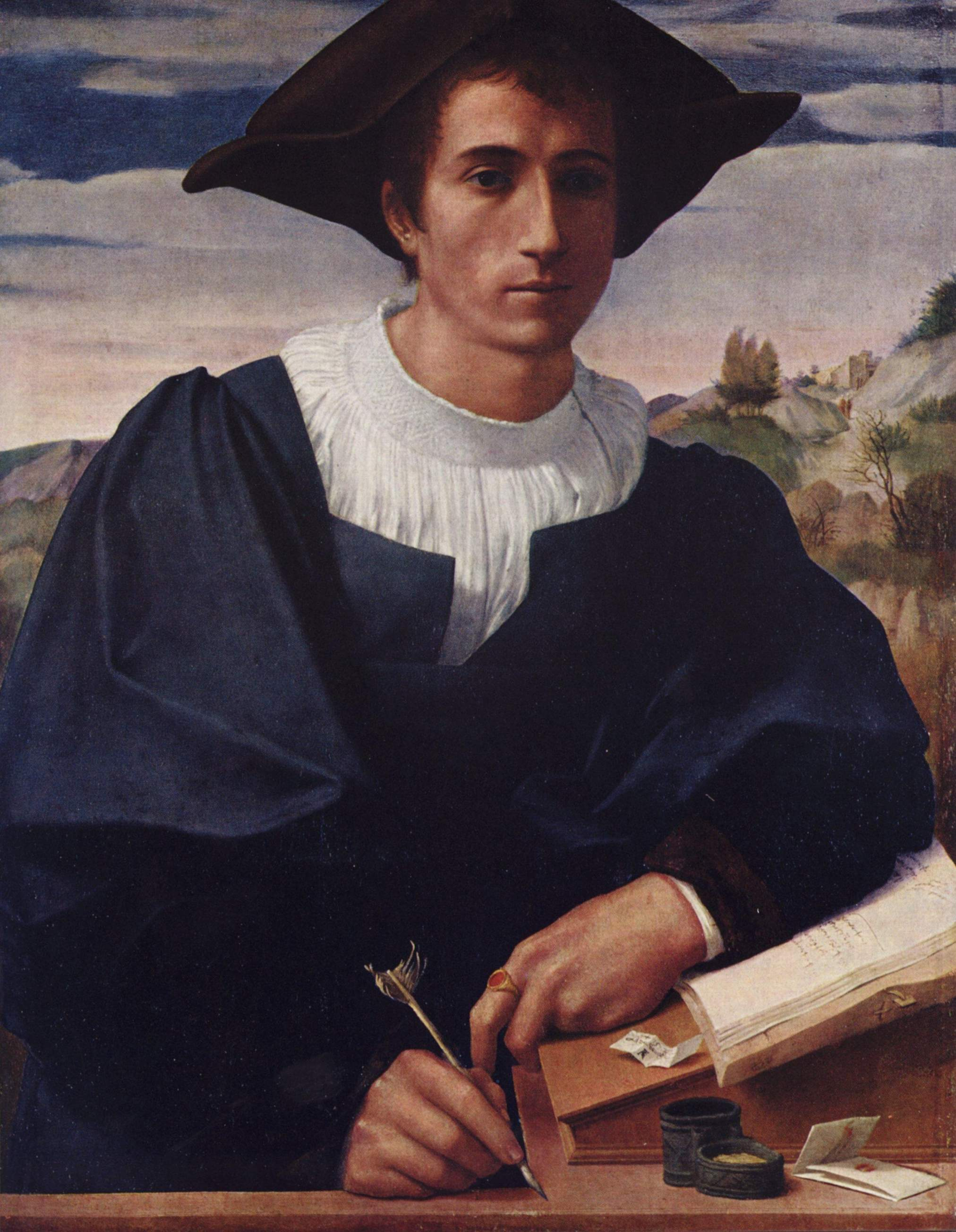
Franciabigio's Portrait of a Young Man writing, 1522, Gemäldegalerie

Franciabigio (1482 – 24 January 1525) was an Italian painter of the Florentine Renaissance. His true name may have been Francesco di Cristofano; he is also referred to as either Marcantonio Franciabigio or Francia Bigio.

== Life and career ==
He was born in Florence, and initially worked under Albertinelli until about 1506. In 1505 he befriended Andrea del Sarto; and by the next year, the two painters set up common shop in the Piazza del Grano. Franciabigio paid much attention to anatomy and perspective, and to the proportions of his figures, though these are often squat in form. He had a large stock of artistic knowledge, and was at first noted for diligence. He was proficient in fresco and Vasari claimed that he surpassed all his contemporaries in this method. It is in his portraits, and not his religious paintings and frescoes, that his painting gathers naturalistic power.

As years went on, and he received frequent commissions for all sorts of public painting for festive occasions, his diligence seemed to wane.

In 1513, in the cloister of the Annunziata he frescoed the Marriage of the Virgin, part of a larger series mainly directed by Andrea del Sarto, and overshadowed by the latter's masterpiece of Birth of the Virgin. Other artists working under Sarto at the cloister included Rosso Fiorentino, Pontormo, Francesco Indaco, and Baccio Bandinelli.

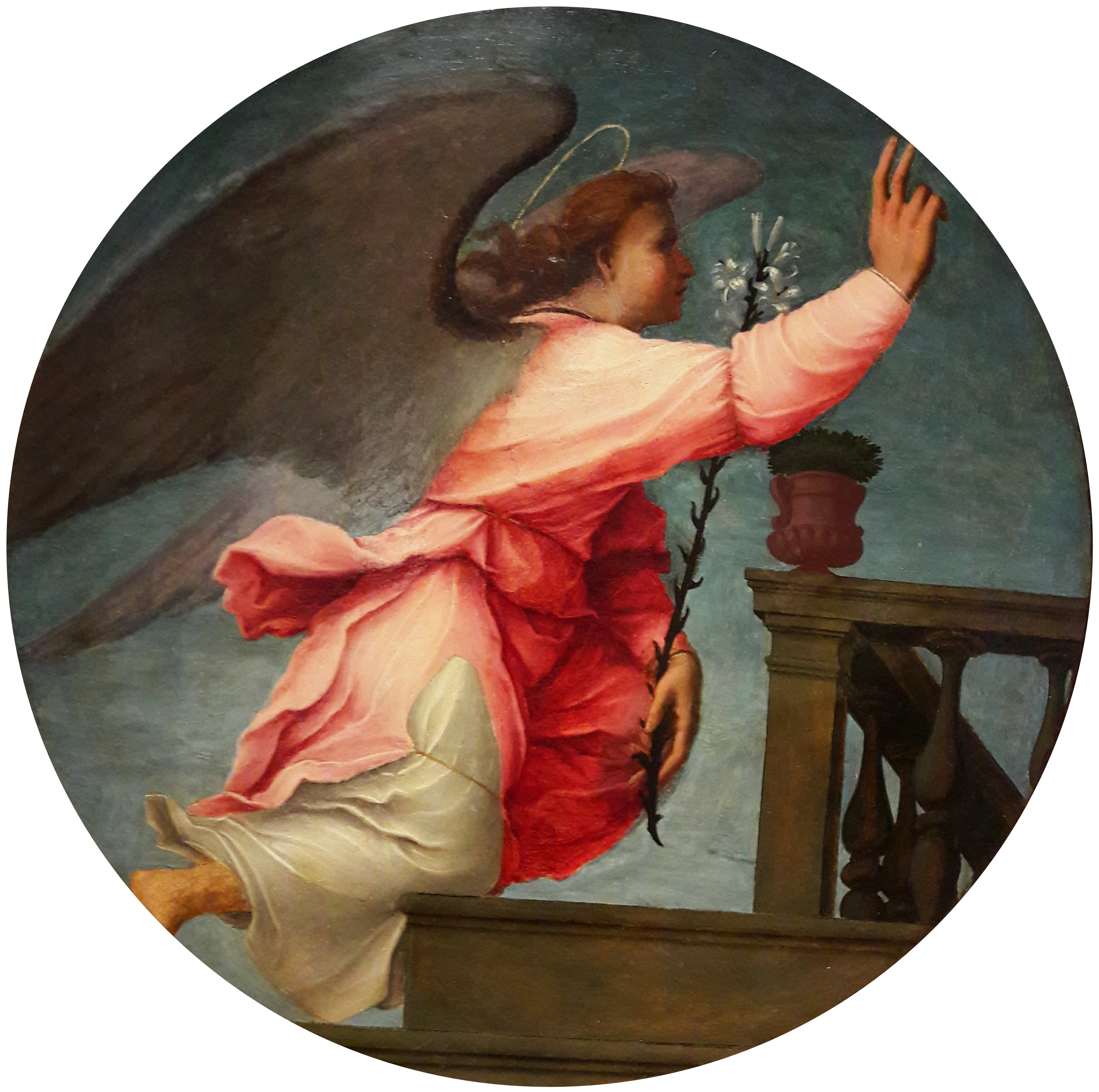
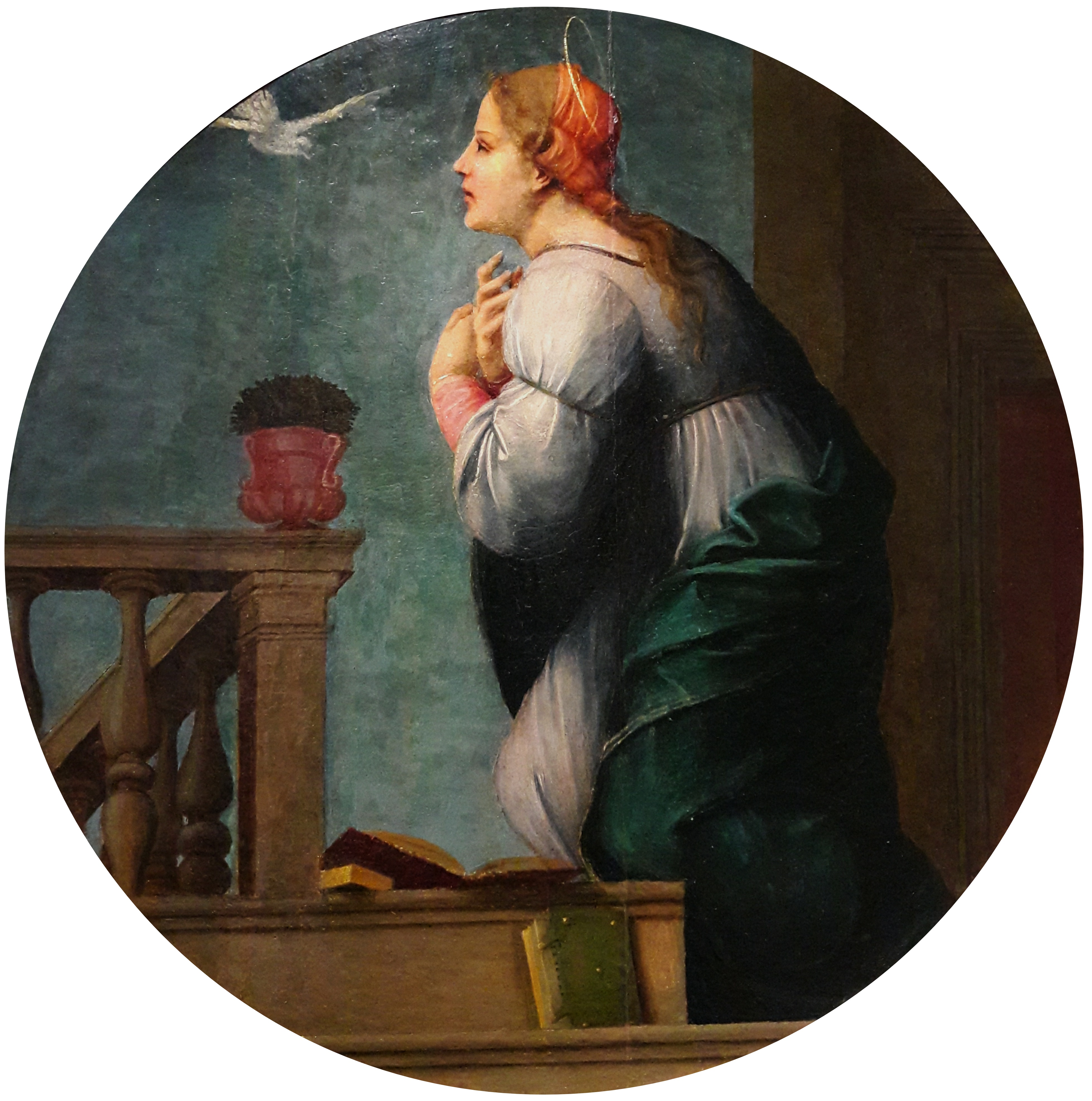
Franciabigio's Annunciation (1510s) in the National Museum in Warsaw, a mirror composition in two tondos divided into two separate pictures, in which the artist abandoned a rather natural pose of the figures and represented the Virgin in a twisted movement, as in contemporary Roman painting

In 1514, he frescoed a Mantegnesque Last Supper for the Convento della Calza in Florence. In 1518-19, at the Convento della Salzo, in another series of frescoes on which Andrea was likewise employed, he executed the Departure of John the Baptist for the Desert, and the Meeting of the Baptist with Jesus.

In 1520–21, at the villa Medici at Poggio a Caiano he frescoed a turgid Triumph of Cicero on the walls of the salon, but again he is overshadowed by Potormo's naturalistic lunette of Vertumnus and Pomona. The array of figures appears distraught rather than celebratory, the antique details are a melange of quotations, and the architect a fancy of Quattrocento style. He painted a St Job altarpiece (1516, Uffizi).

In the early 1520s, Franciabigio also painted Madonna and Christ Child, a composition that highlights Raphael Sanzio's influence. Scholars note this painting's significance in illustrating naturalism.

Various works which have been ascribed to Raphael are reasonably deemed to be by Franciabigio. Such as the Madonna del Pozzo, with its awkwardly muscular John the Baptist; and some of his portraits, including the half figure of a Young Man. These two works show a close analogy in style to another in the Pitti gallery, avowedly by Franciabigio, a Youth at a Window, and to some others—which bear this painter's recognized monogram.

For a number of years, Franciabigio maintained the studio with Andrea. Together with Andrea’s student, Jacopo da Pontormo, they decorated the Medici villa at Poggio a Caiano, where Franciabigio’s Triumph of Caesar displays his talent for narrative painting. Andrea’s influence on Franciabigio may be seen in the dark, smoky background and the soft, dramatic lighting of the St. Job Altar (1516).

The series of portraits, taken collectively, placed beyond dispute the eminent and idiosyncratic genius of the master. Two other works of his, of some celebrity, are the Calumny of Apelles, in the Pitti Palace, and the Bath of Bathsheba (painted in 1523), in the Dresden gallery.

== Critical assessment and legacy ==
When compared to his younger contemporary colleague, del Sarto, Franciabigio appears more sculptural and less forward-looking. The Quattrocento monumentality (or stiffness) of posing is evident in his figures. Franciabigio attends more to linearity and balance in fresco recalling Massacio, while Sarto's paintings reflect an understanding that characterizes Venetian work, and the development of sway that will "mannerize" art in the decades to come.

Franciabigio's portraits

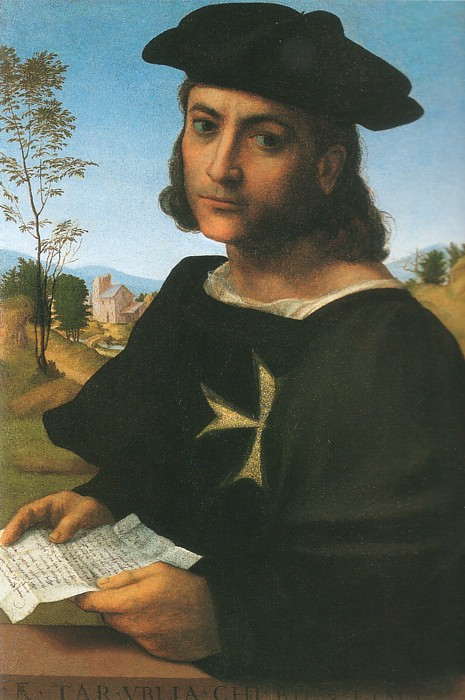
An Unknown Man

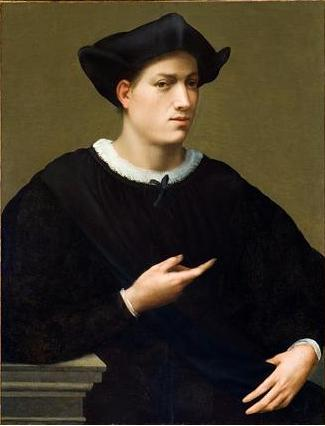
Young man

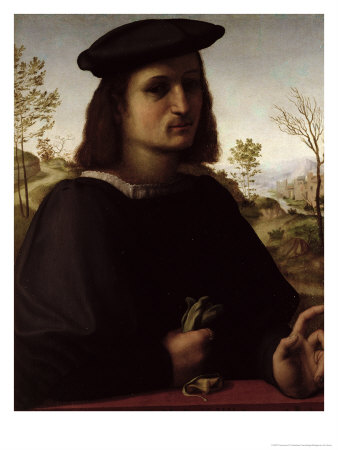
Portrait of a Youth with Gloves

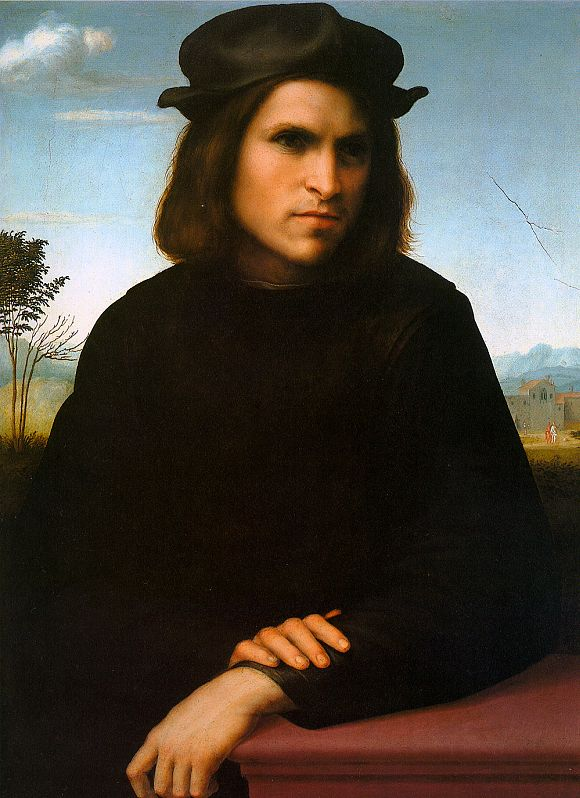
Portrait of a man
Franciabigio's madonnas

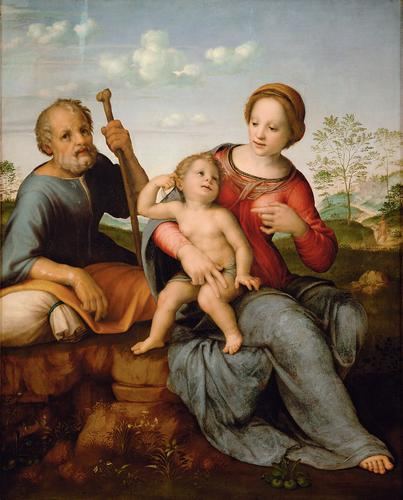
Holy Family

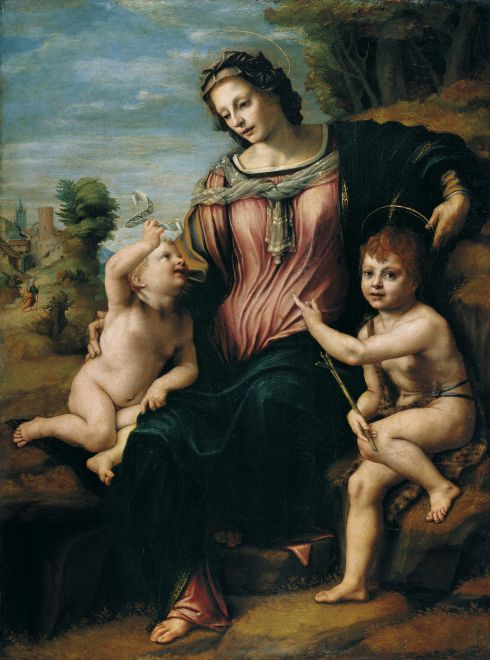
Madonna and Child with Saint John

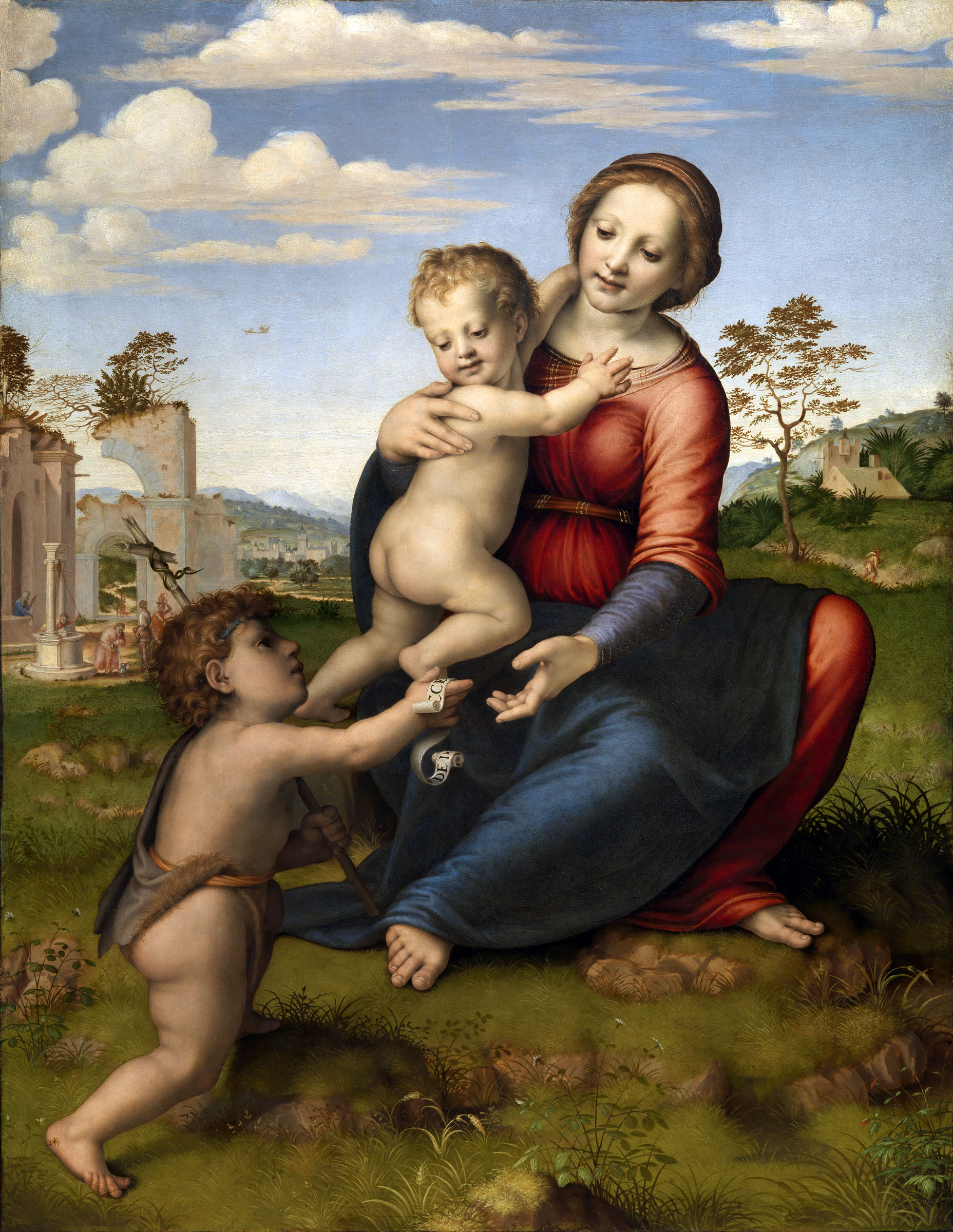
Madonna of the Well or Madonna and Child with the young St. John the Baptist

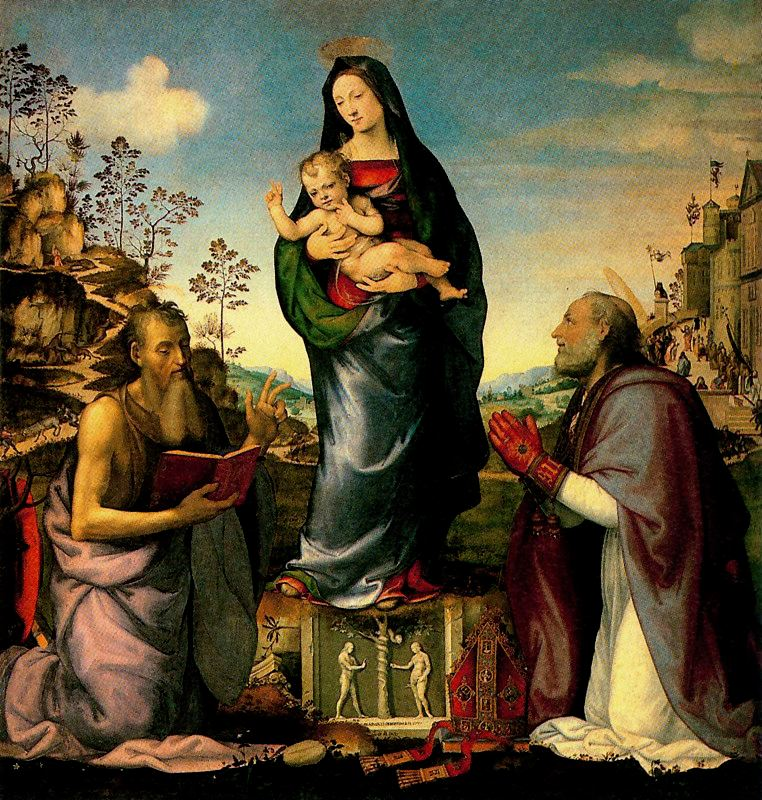
Madonna and Saints
