= Assumption of the Virgin (Rosso Fiorentino) =

Fresco by Rosso Fiorentino

- Assunzione di Maria (Italian)
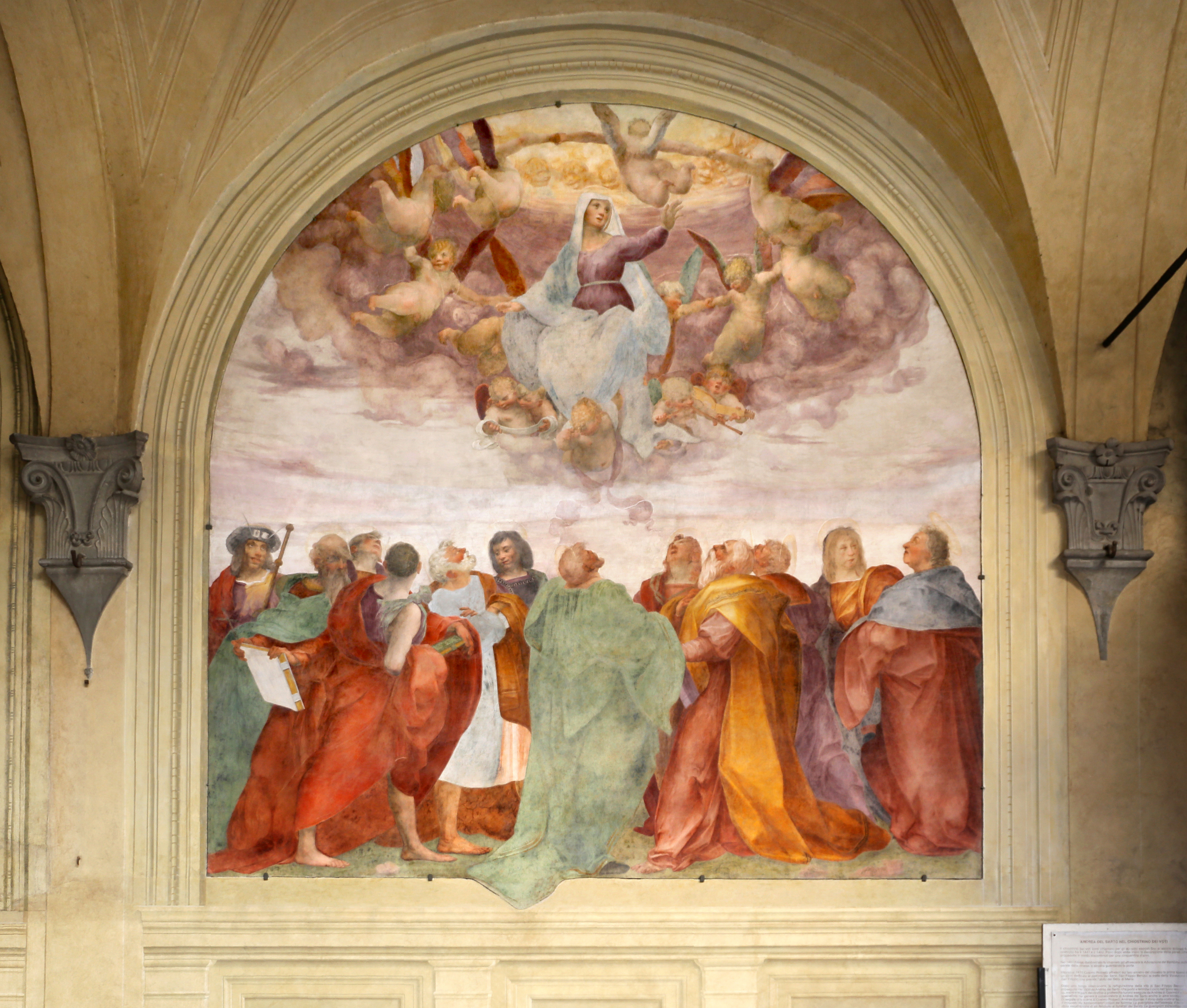
- Artist: Rosso Fiorentino
- Year: 1513–1514
- Medium: Fresco
- Subject: Assumption of Mary dimensions = 385 by 337 centimetres (152 in × 133 in)
- Location: Basilica della Santissima Annuziata; Florence

Assumption of the Virgin (Italian: Assunzione di Maria) is a fresco by the Italian Mannerist painter Rosso Fiorentino in the Chiostro dei Voti of the Basilica della Santissima Annunziata in Florence.

Vasari's Lives of the Artists relates how it was painted rapidly between 1513 and 1514 ready to be inaugurated at the solemnity of 8 September 1514, when the basilica received the title of perpetual jubilee from Pope Leo X. Fiorentino came highly recommended to the monks by his master Andrea del Sarto (painter of most of the lunettes in the cloister). The work's two-register composition derives from Last Judgement by Fra Bartolomeo and Mariotto Albertinelli and Raphael's Oddi Altarpiece.

In 1515, the monks expressed their dissatisfaction with Fiorentino and asked him to repaint the fresco, to which Fiorentino agreed. The work's composition was also an influence on the artist's Madonna and Child with Cherubs, produced around the same time.

== Description and style ==
The Assumption has a pattern derived from the Last Judgement by Fra Bartolomeo and Mariotto Albertinelli, divided into two registers, with the Apostles and the crowd below, where is Mary's sarcophagus, and the celestial vision of the Virgin in glory with angels at the top. Another model may have been the Oddi Altarpiece by Raphael, although Barocchi highlighted the influence of Albrecht Dürer, in works such as the drawing for an Assumption destroyed in 1674, perhaps known through prints. From the influence of Fra Bartolomeo also derives the motif of the virgin surrounded by cheering angels, with vigorous anatomies, similar to Michelangelo.

The spatial structuring is enlivened by a notable freedom in the arrangement of the Apostles and in the search for effects from below in the angelic circles around Mary. The ambivalence seems refined, in the upper part, between the almost calligraphic rhythm of the circle of little angels and the dimension of the space, intuitive but not defined. Finally, the chromatic intensity and the accentuation of the volumes derive from the example of Andrea del Sarto, as in the nearby lunette of the Journey of the Magi. A piece of pictorial illusionism is the flap of the apostle's cloak in the center that falls beyond the frame of the fresco, as if to cancel the distance between reality and pictorial representation.

Numerous elements also appear innovative, such as the types of the Apostles, with broad faces and overall little marked features, big noses and sometimes bizarre expressions, perhaps influenced by Nordic prints, which then already circulated widely. Often complementary colors are juxtaposed and also the arrangement of the figures is innovative, bordering on the measurability of a Renaissance mold. The Apostles in fact form a closed circle, from which two tangents branch off to the sides, more or less symmetrical.

== Bibliography ==
- Casalini, Eugenio M. (1980). La SS. Annunziata di Firenze: Guida storico-artistica [The SS. Annunziata of Florence: Historical-artistic guide] (in Italian) (Second ed.). Florence: Becocci Editore. OCLC 812710480.
- Marchetti Letta, Elisabetta (1994). Pontormo, Rosso Fiorentino (in Italian). Florence: Scala. ISBN 88-8117-028-0. LCCN 95212333.
- "Catalogue entry" (in Italian).
