= The Virgin Adoring the Child with Saint Joseph =

Painting by Fra Bartolomeo

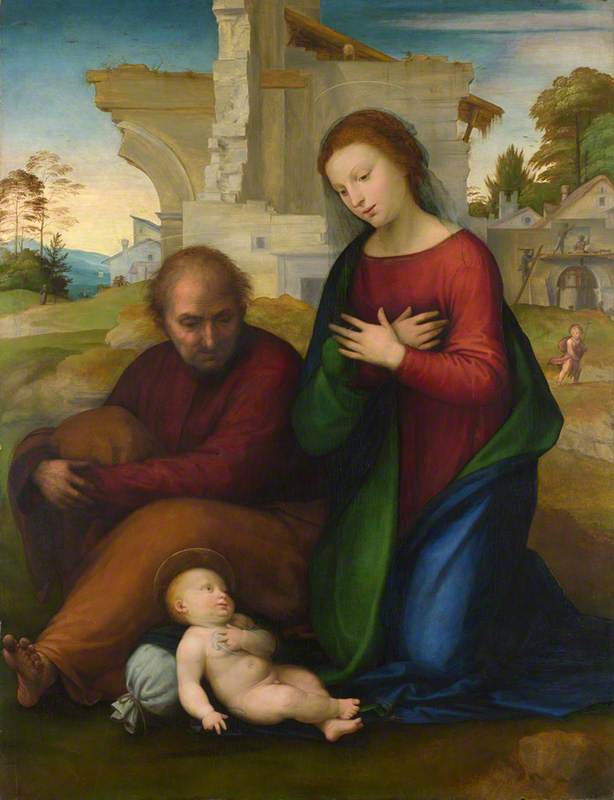
- Artist: Fra Bartolomeo
- Year: c. 1511
- Medium: oil on panel
- Dimensions: 137.8 cm × 104.8 cm (54.3 in × 41.3 in)
- Location: National Gallery, London

The Virgin Adoring the Child with Saint Joseph is an oil-on-panel painting by the Italian Renaissance painter Fra Bartolomeo, executed no later than 1511. It is held in the National Gallery, in London.

== History and description ==
A drawing by Fra Bartolomeo preserved in the Louvre suggests that the original idea involved a different composition, entirely dominated by the three leading figures and with the presence of St John the Baptist in the foreground. The finished work probably dates back to the years of his collaboration with Mariotto Albertinelli, who might have used it as a model for a painting of his own, now preserved in the Borghese Gallery in Rome.

The painting depicts the Virgin Mary, kneeling on the ground with her hands crossed in adoration, to the right, and Saint Joseph, depicted as a beardless older man, seated on the ground at the left; both are looking at the Child Jesus, who lies in the ground, reclined in a kind of pillow, with a hand on His chest. The scene, very frequent in religious paintings, intends to document the humble origins of Jesus, and is set outside the walls of Bethlehem. In this painting, the scene is enriched by some unusual details: the whim of ruins in the background, the presence of some men on scaffolding, engaged in the decoration of the facade of a church, and the figure of John the Baptist infant, depicted in the background, and isolated from the rest of the figures, who apparently has escaped the Massacre of the Innocents, ordered by king Herod the Great.
