= Last Judgement (Fra Bartolomeo) =

Painting by Fra Bartolomeo and Mariotto Albertinelli

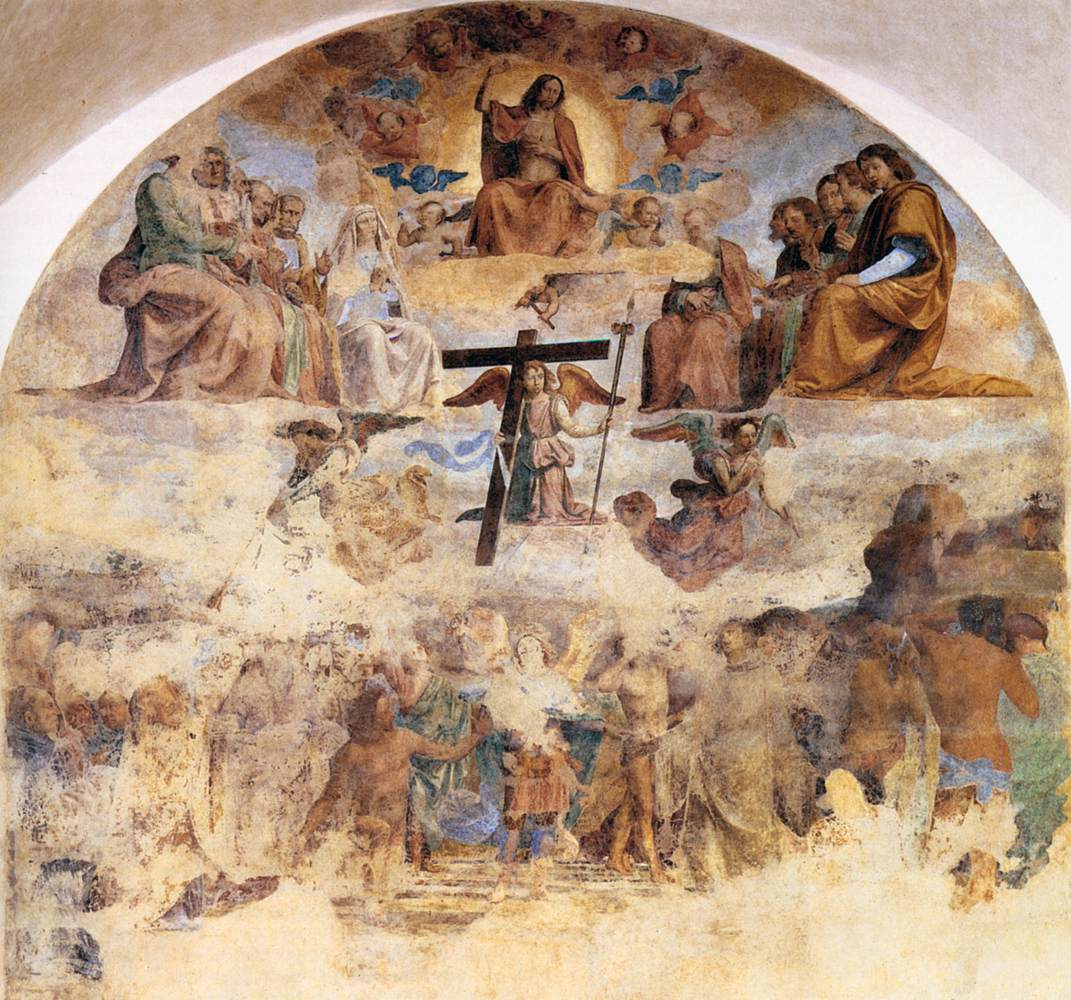
- Artist: Fra Bartolomeo and Mariotto Albertinelli
- Year: 1499-1501
- Medium: fresco
- Dimensions: 360 cm × 375 cm (140 in × 148 in)
- Location: Museo Nazionale di San Marco, Florence

Last Judgement is a fresco, begun by the Italian Renaissance painter Fra Bartolomeo in 1499 and completed by his colleague Mariotto Albertinelli in 1501. Originally commissioned for a cemetery chapel of Ospedale di Santa Maria Nuova, it is now in the Museo Nazionale di San Marco in Florence. Parts of the composition are illegible as a result of centuries of surface losses. The painting was a key influence on contemporary artists such as Raphael.

== History ==
On 22 April 1499, Gerozzo di Monna Vanna Dini commissioned the work from Fra Bartolomeo, though he was only able to complete the upper part of the lunette before taking vows as a Dominican friar on 26 July 1500 and temporarily renouncing painting. Using Fra Bartolomeo's "finished cartoon" and preparatory drawings, Albertinelli completed the fresco and received payment on 11 March 1501.

Vasari described the work passionately: "He conducted with so much diligence and beautiful manner in that part that he ended up acquiring great fame, besides the one he had, much was celebrated for having with very good consideration expressed the glory of Heaven and Christ with the twelve Apostles judge the twelve tribes, which with beautiful cloths are softly colored. (...) This work [remained] imperfect, having more desire to attend to religion than to painting".

== Description and style ==
The upper part of the painting shows Christ the judge within a luminous almond, raising His arm as a sign of judgment, a typical gesture of iconography. He is surrounded by cherubs and seraphs, while below Him a flying angel holds the symbols of the Passion and two others blow the trumpets of the Apocalypse. On the sides, on benches of clouds, the Apostles and the Virgin Mary are arranged in two perspective foreshortened rows.

Below there are a series of figures arranged in a semicircle, today very incomplete, with the archangel Michael in the center. There are 75 figures, legible today mainly thanks to the existence of two copies, one of the Tuscan school (courtyard of the former convent of Sant'Apollonia, Florence) and a cartoon by Raffaello Bonaiuti executed in 1871, at the time of the detachment (Uffizi, Florence).

The figures of the angels in the center downwards are generally assigned to the Albertinelli. In the characters below there were various portraits that are scarcely legible today, including that of Giuliano Bugiardini and of Beato Angelico.

Overall, the work is inspired by the calm serenity of Perugino's works, or the Coronation of the Virgin in Domenico Ghirlandaio's Tornabuoni Chapel, but the artist detached himself from the 15-century style by creating a completely new monumentality, solemn and calm but also vigorous. He would have great influence on his young friend Raphael, who copied the setting of the figures in the Trinity and Saints of Perugia and who also had it in mind, a few years later, for the Dispute of the Sacrament in the Stanza della Segnatura.
