= Madonna and Child with Cherubs =

Painting by Rosso Fiorentino

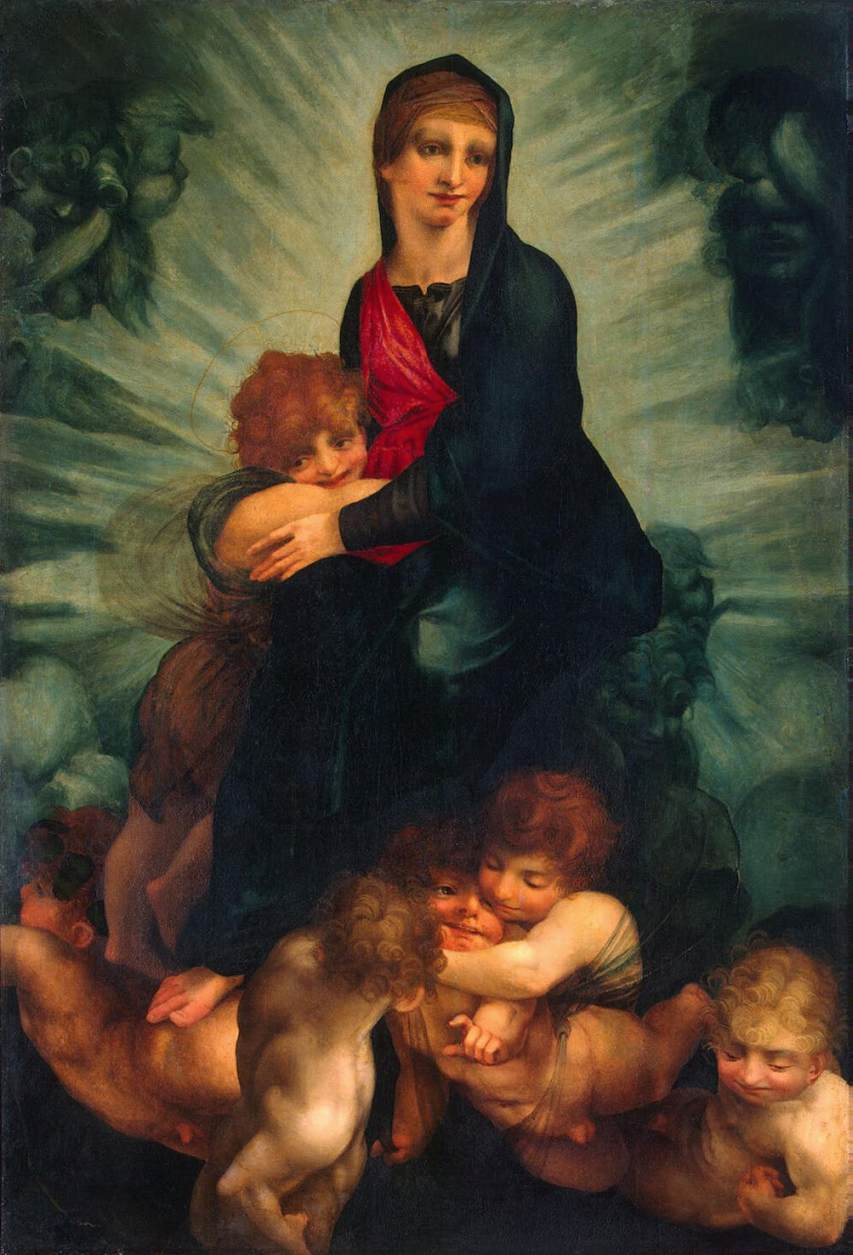
- Artist: Rosso Fiorentino
- Year: c. 1512-1517
- Medium: oil on panel, transferred to canvas
- Dimensions: 111 by 75.5 centimetres (43.7 in × 29.7 in)
- Location: Hermitage Museum, Saint Petersburg

Madonna and Child with Cherubs or The Virgin and the Child with Angels is an oil painting by the Italian Mannerist painter Rosso Fiorentino, created between 1512 and 1517. Originally on panel, it was later transferred to canvas. It was acquired in 1810 in Paris with help from the baron Dominique Vivant Denon for the Hermitage Museum, in Saint Petersburg, where it now hangs.

The composition draws on models by Fra Bartolomeo and the pyramidical group owes much to Michelangelo. It is also reminiscent of Fiorentino's own Assumption of the Virgin, first painted in 1512–1513 and retouched or repainted in 1517.

The influence of Michelangelo is apparent in the twisting of Mary and in the plastic vigor of the figures, while the accentuation of the expressions already reveals a completely personal non-conformism, slightly enlarging the somatic features of the faces: the mouths are elongated grins, the noses marked, the eyes large.

The tender embrace between Mary and her son seems to echo the Madonna of Bruges, while the cherubs that emerge from the background are reminiscent of Michelangelo's unfinished works such as the Taddei Tondo and the Tondo Pitti. Among the putti, one cherub in the foreground is particularly eye catching, as it faces away from the viewer, projecting its head and shoulders outwards and holds a hand at its side. It looks very much like a view of Michelangelo's David from above. The other cherubs face the audience, but each avert their gaze downward or to another figure.

The colour presents a strong contrast between cool tones—the ice blue and midnight blue of the background and Mary's cloak—and the warm and luminous shades of the skin tones.
