= Presentation of Christ in the Temple (Fra Bartolomeo) =

Painting by Fra Bartolomeo

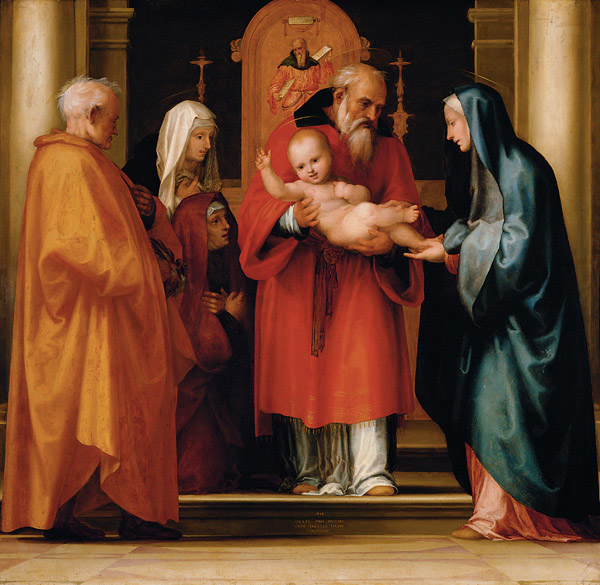
- Artist: Fra Bartolomeo
- Year: 1516
- Medium: oil on poplar wood
- Dimensions: 155 cm × 159 cm (61 in × 63 in)
- Location: Kunsthistorisches Museum, Vienna

Presentation of Christ in the Temple is an oil-on-wood painting by the Italian Renaissance painter Fra Bartolomeo, most likely commissioned by Pope Leo X for the Epiphany of 1516. It originally hung in the novices' chapel in San Marco, Florence. It is inscribed with the year 1516. It is now held in the Kunsthistorisches Museum in Vienna.

== History and description ==
The painting represents the episode of the Presentation of Jesus in the temple, as ordered by the law of Moses, which Mary and Joseph did with Jesus. Simeon the priest and Anna the prophetess are other characters in the episode narrated by the Gospel of Luke.

The scene takes place in an environment with classical architecture, and an altar in the background surrounded by two columns, of which only the shaft and base are seen. In the center, Simeon, the old priest, dressed with a bright red tunic, holds the Child Jesus to whom he gives his blessing. Jesus looks to the viewer joyfully and also gives a blessing with His right hand. Joseph, depicted as beardless, unlike most representations, stands on the left and Mary on the right, who looks tenderly to Jesus. Behind there are two female figures, one of whom is the prophetess Anna. On the altar there is an altarpiece with the representation of Moses.

The leisurely rhythm, the fullness of colour, the volumes and the monumental grandeur of the characters make this work an excellent example of the painter's style and, more generally, of the San Marco school whose undisputed exponent was Fra Bartolomeo.

== Provenance ==
In 1781 Grand Duke Leopold I chose it for the Tribuna of the Uffizi, giving the monks a copy in return, and also a crucifix, chalices, furniture, and silver. In 1792 it was exchanged for a group of works with the Vienna Museum. There are several ancient copies extant and a sketch, perhaps autograph, in the Treccani Collection in Milan.
