= Giuliano Bugiardini =

Italian painter

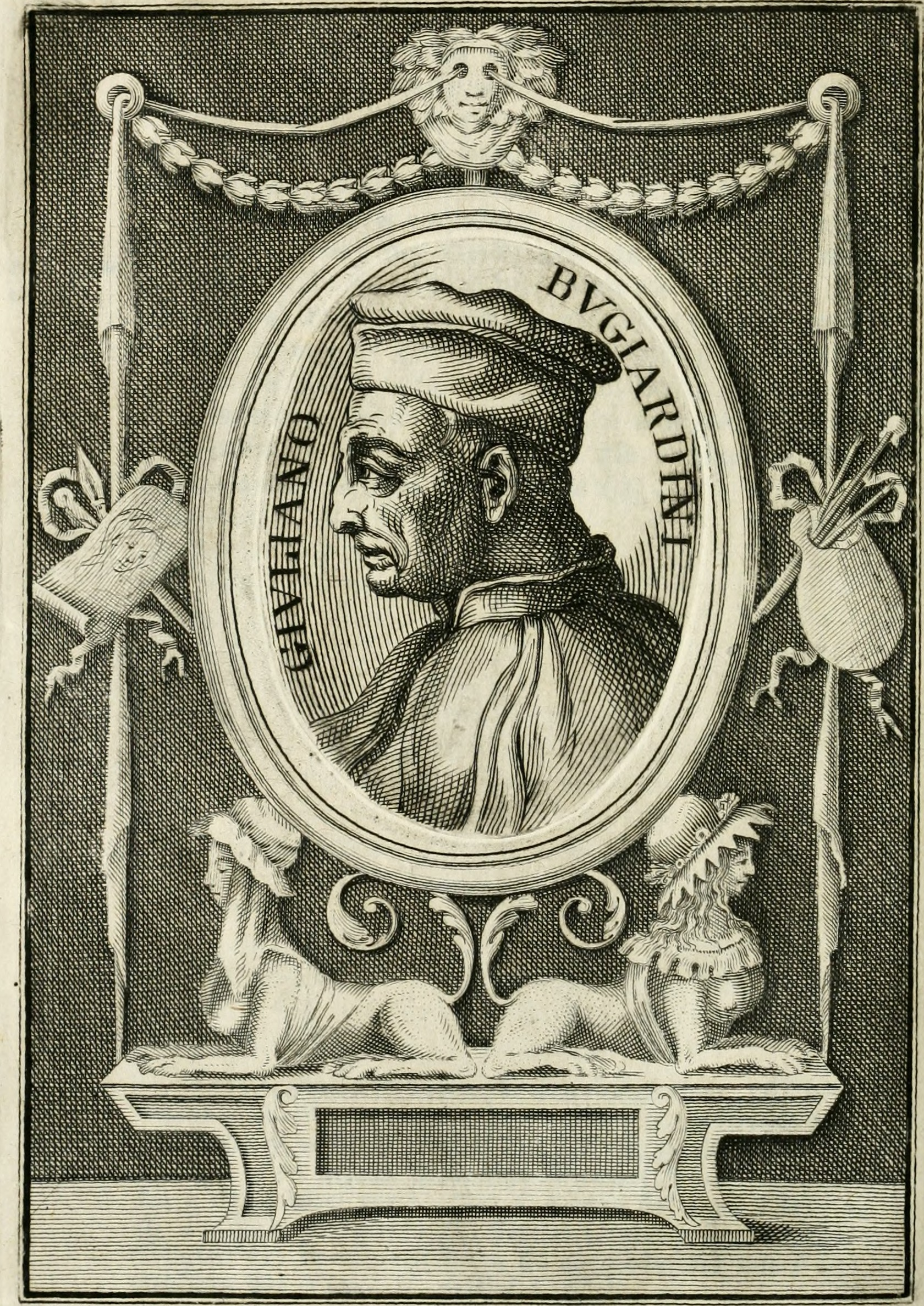
Portrait in Le Vite (1791).

Giuliano di Piero di Simone Bugiardini (29 January 1475 – 17 February 1555) was an Italian Renaissance painter. He was born and was mainly active in Florence. He was a painter primarily of religious subjects but he also executed a number of portraits and a few works with mythological subjects.

== Life and work ==
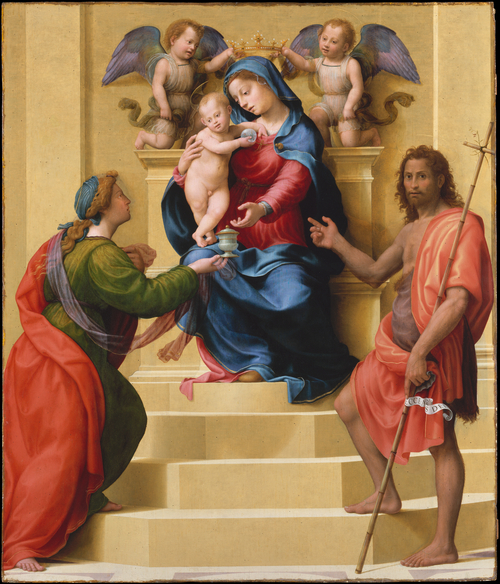
Virgin and Child with Saints Mary Magdalene and John the Baptist, circa 1523. New York, Metropolitan Museum of Art.

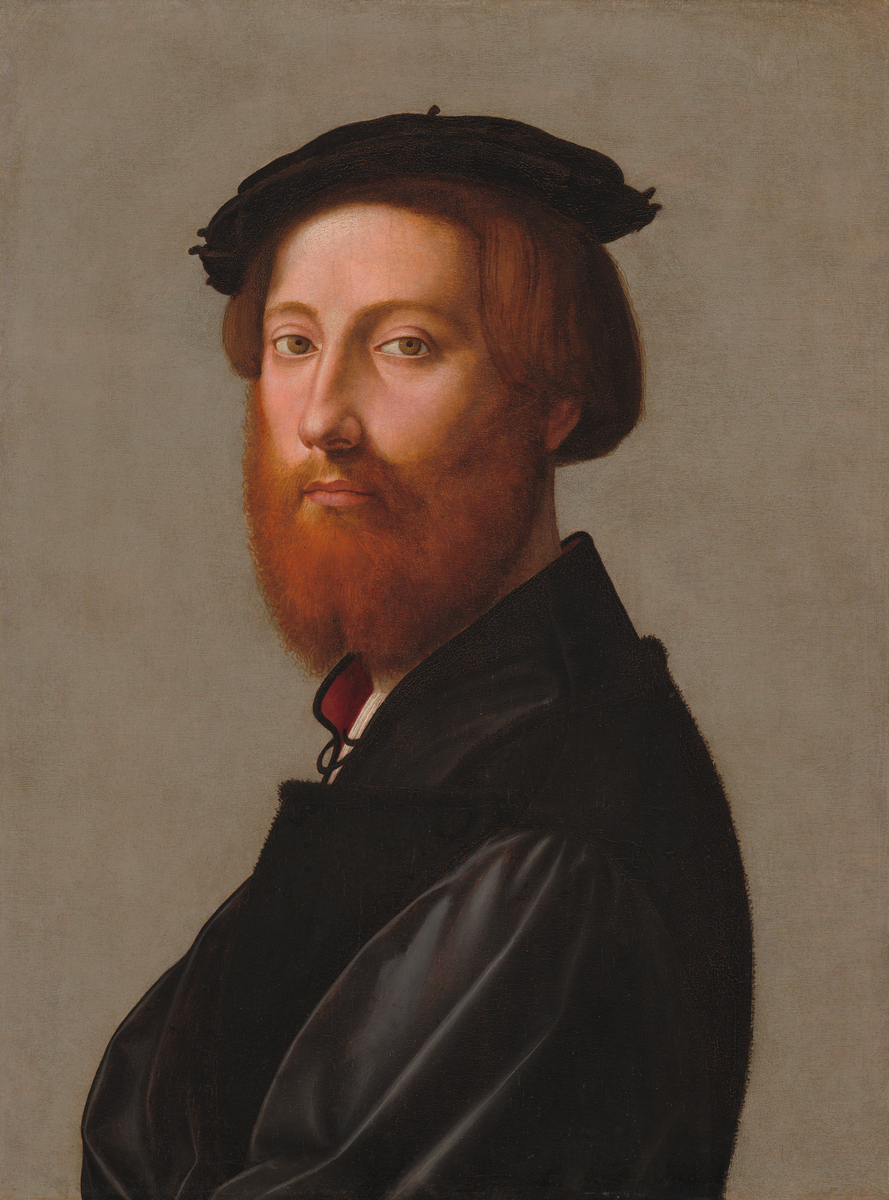
The portrait of Leonardo de'Ginori by Giuliano Bugiardini

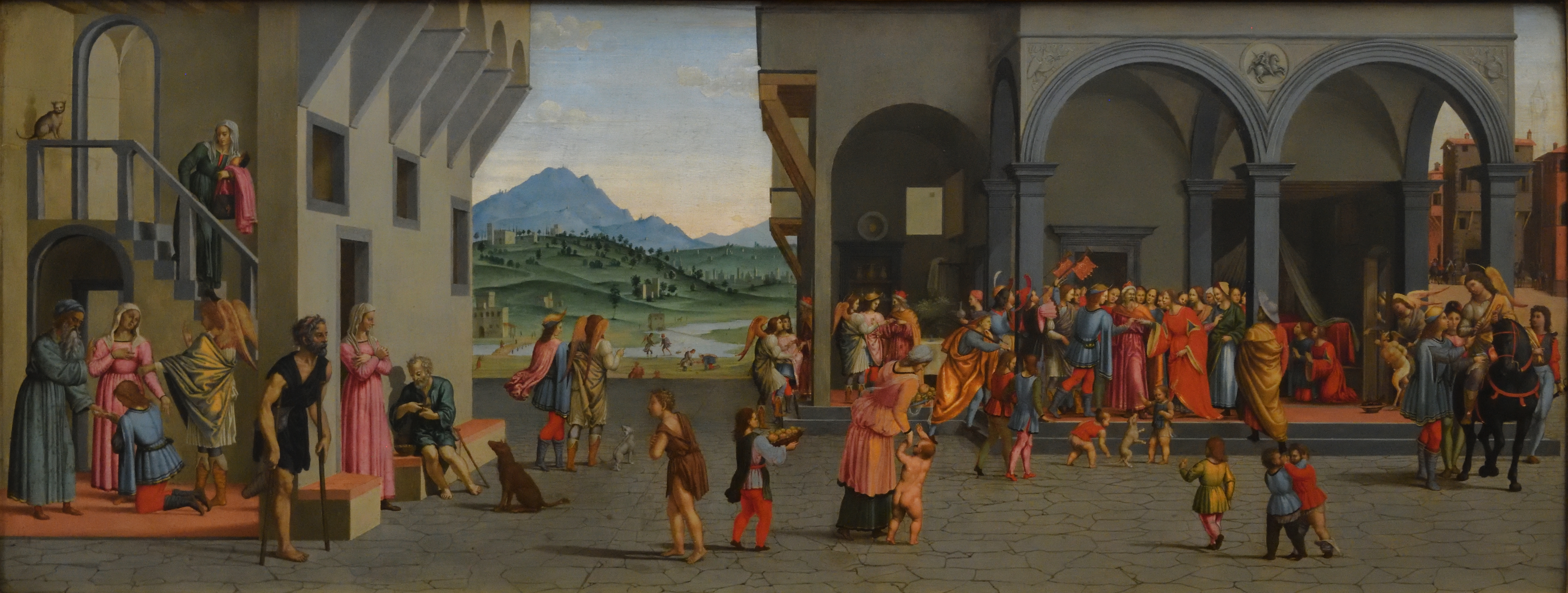
The story of Tobit by Giuliano Bugiardini

Giorgio Vasari, in his Lives of the Artists, devoted a biography to Bugiardini in which he claimed the artist began his career under the sculptor Bertoldo in Lorenzo de' Medici's famous sculpture garden near the convent of San Marco. It was probably there that Bugiardini met the young Michelangelo, with whom he'd remain friends throughout his career. In the early 1490s, both artists joined the workshop of Domenico Ghirlandaio, where they were trained in the art of painting. Bugiardini was an independent artist by 1503, the year in which the joined the Florentine painters' confraternity the Compagnia di San Luca and formed a business partnership with Mariotto Albertinelli. The partnership was dissolved in 1509, when Albertinelli rejoined forces with his previous partner, Fra Bartolomeo. Bugiardini remained close with both artists and even completed several works left unfinished by the latter, including the Abduction of Dinah (Vienna, Kunsthistorisches Museum).

In 1508, Bugiardini, Agnolo di Domenico del Mazziere, Francesco Granacci and other artists were called to Rome to assist Michelangelo with the Sistine Chapel ceiling, but their services were quickly rejected and the team was sent back to Florence. Bugiardini's friendship with Michelangelo was, however, enduring. According to Vasari, Michelangelo designed most of the figures in Bugiardini's large Martyrdom of Saint Catherine (1530–40) in the Rucellai chapel at Santa Maria Novella in Florence. Bugiardini also painted Michelangelo's portrait (Florence, Casa Buonarroti).

Bugiardini was active in Bologna in the second half of the 1520s. There he painted an altarpiece of the Mystic Marriage of Saint Catherine for the Albergati family chapel in San Francesco (now Bologna, Pinacoteca); the so-called Madonna of the Palms for the oratory of Santa Maria di Galliera (now Allentown Art Museum), a Nativity and Saints for San Salvatore (now Berlin, Gemäldegalerie) and a handful of other works now in Bologna's picture gallery. Most of these works are signed. By 1530 Bugiardini was back in Florence. His activity seems to have dwindled in the following decades, and in 1555 he died in his native Florence.

Bugiardini has long been criticized as a mediocre talent incapable of understanding the formal principles of Michelangelo, Raphael, Leonardo and Fra Bartolomeo, all major influences on his work. Michelangelo himself wrote that Bugiardini was a "good person but a simple man," and Vasari claimed that Michelangelo was envious of Bugiardini since he was happy with what little skill he had, in contrast to Michelangelo was never satisfied with his works. Other scholars have commended Bugiardini's color and light and the stark simplicity in many of his works. The Virgin and Child with Saints Mary Magdalene and John the Baptist (circa 1523) at the Metropolitan Museum of Art, widely regarded as one of Bugiardini's most successful creations, is so refined that it was once considered to be by Fra Bartolomeo.

Most of the drawings once given to Bugiardini are now attributed to others.
