= Vivant Denon =

French artist, writer, diplomat, author and archaeologist (1747–1825)

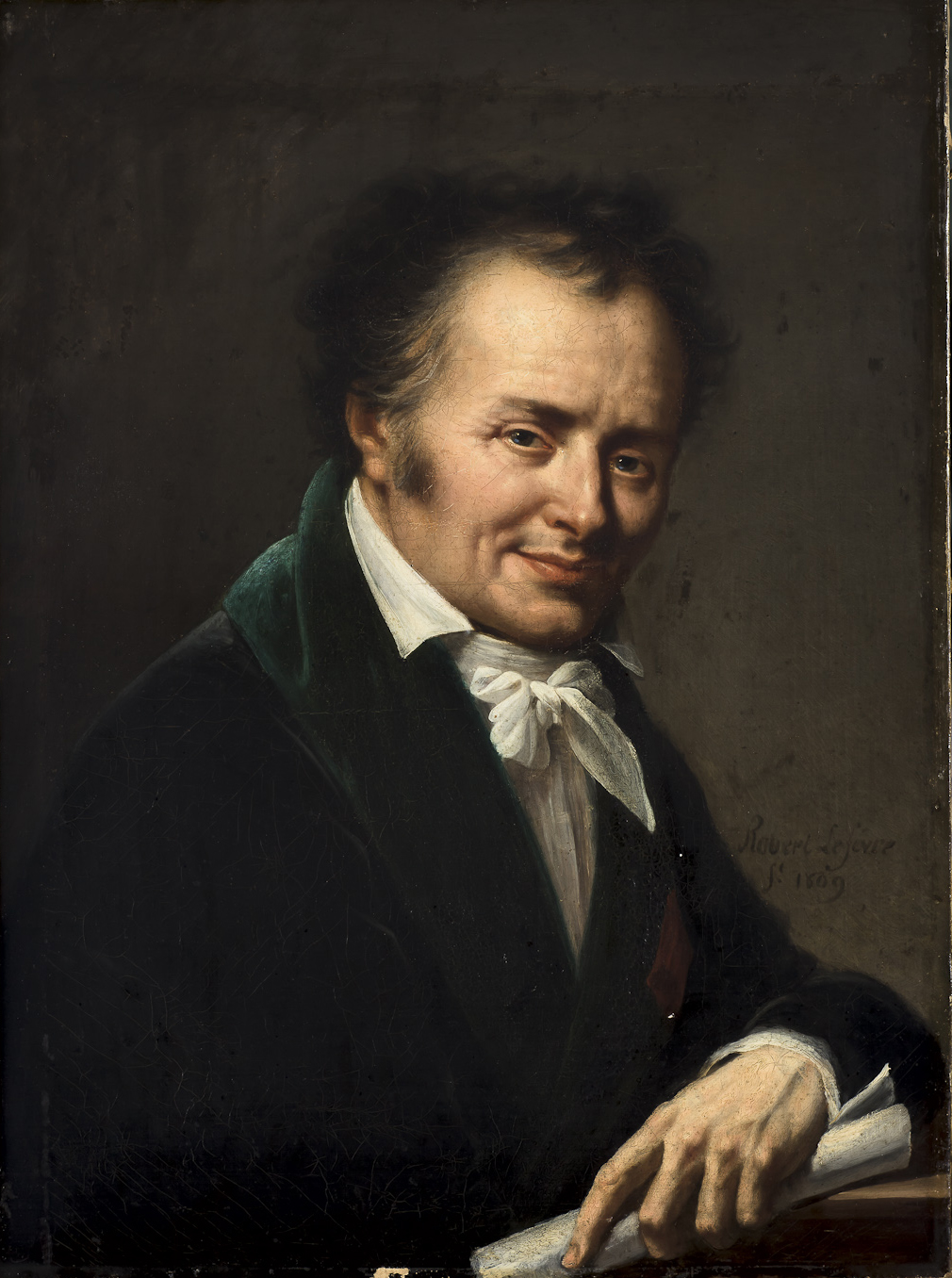
- Portrait by Robert Lefèvre c. 1809
- Born: 4 January 1747; Chalon-sur-Saône, Burgundy, Kingdom of France
- Died: 27 April 1825 (aged 78); Paris, Kingdom of France
- Scientific career
- Fields: Engraving, Archaeology

Dominique Vivant, Baron Denon (French pronunciation: [dɔminik vivɑ̃ baʁɔ̃ dənɔ̃]; 4 January 1747 – 27 April 1825) was a French artist, writer, diplomat, author, and archaeologist. Denon was a diplomat for France under Louis XV and Louis XVI. He was appointed as the first director of the Louvre museum by Napoleon after the Egyptian campaign of 1798–1801, and is commemorated in the Denon Wing of the Louvre museum and in the Dominique-Vivant Denon Research Center. His two-volume Voyage dans la basse et la haute Egypte ("Journey in Lower and Upper Egypt"), 1802, was foundational for modern Egyptology.

== Birth and name ==
Vivant Denon was born in Givry, near Chalon-sur-Saône, to a family called "de Non", of the "petite noblesse" or gentry, and until the French Revolution signed himself as "le chevalier de Non". Like many of the nobility, he revised his surname at the Revolution to lose the "nobiliary particle" "de". He seems to have consistently avoided using his baptised first name "Dominique", preferring his middle name "Vivant", and so is usually known as "Vivant Denon". He was created "Baron Denon" by Napoleon in August 1812, at the age of 65.

== Early life ==
He was sent to Paris to study law, but he showed a decided preference for art and literature, and soon gave up his profession. In his twenty-third year he produced a comedy, Le Bon Pére, which obtained a succès d'estime, as he had already won a position in society by his agreeable manners and exceptional conversational powers. He became a favorite of Louis XV, who entrusted him with the collection and arrangement of a cabinet of medals and antique gems for Madame de Pompadour, and subsequently appointed him attaché to the French embassy at St. Petersburg.

== Diplomatic career ==
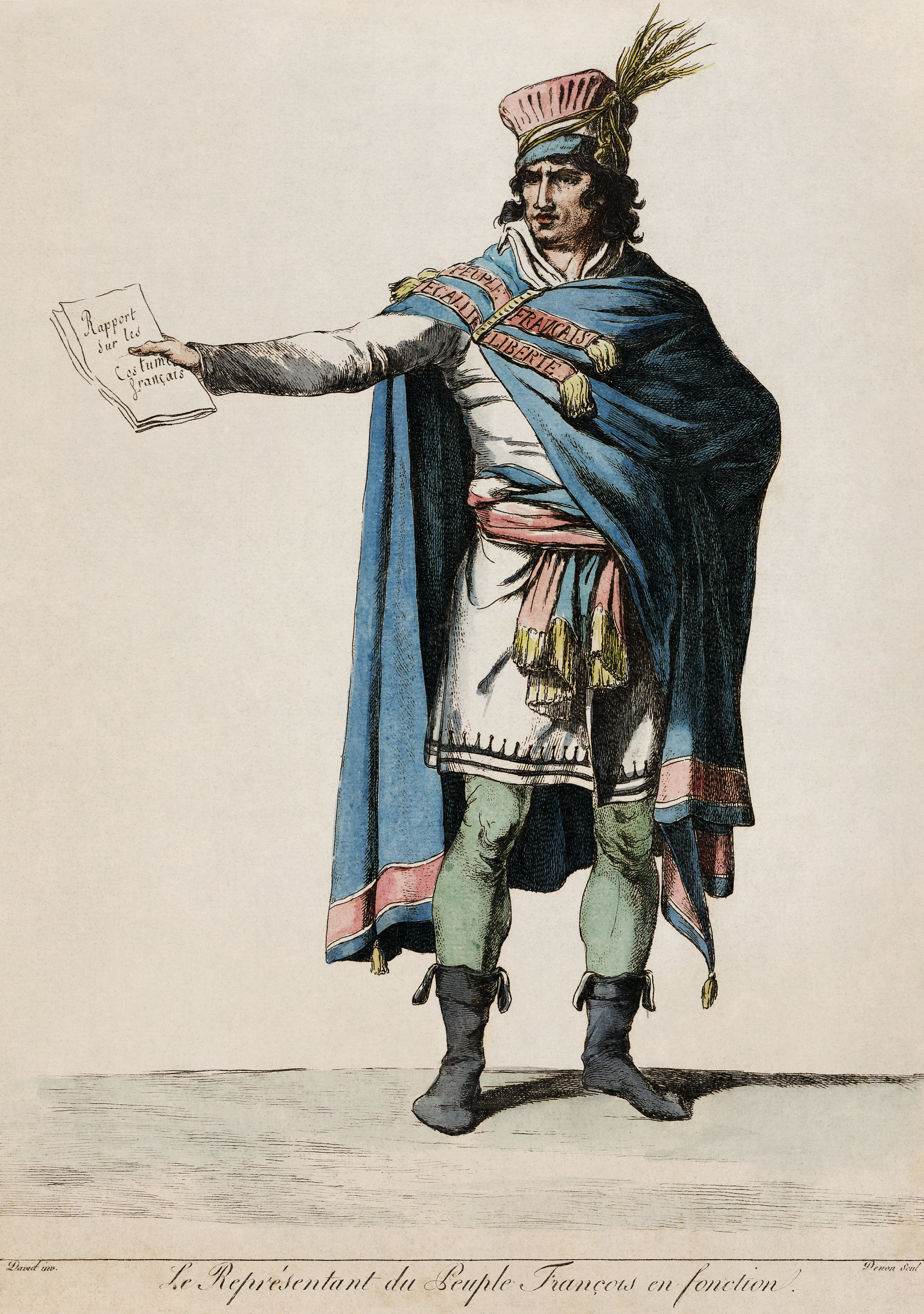
Engraving by Denon of a Republican costume designed by Jacques-Louis David

On the accession of Louis XVI, Denon was transferred to Sweden; but he returned, after a brief interval, to Paris with the ambassador M. de Vergennes, who had been appointed foreign minister. In 1775 Denon was sent on a secret mission to Switzerland, and took the opportunity of visiting Voltaire at Ferney. He made a portrait of the philosopher, which was engraved and published on his return to Paris. His next diplomatic appointment was to Naples, where he spent seven years, first as secretary to the embassy and afterwards as chargé d'affaires. He devoted this period to a careful study of the monuments of ancient art, collecting many specimens and making drawings of others. He also perfected himself in etching and mezzotinto engraving. While in Naples he met Sir William and Lady Hamilton and he etched Lady Hamilton 'posing'.

The death of his patron, Charles Gravier, comte de Vergennes, in 1787, led to his recall, and the rest of his life was given mainly to artistic pursuits. On his return to Paris he was admitted a member of the Académie royale de peinture et de sculpture (1787). After a brief interval he returned to Italy, living chiefly at Venice. He also visited Florence and Bologna, and afterwards went to Switzerland. While there he heard that his property had been confiscated, and his name placed on the list of the proscribed, and with characteristic courage he resolved at once to return to Paris: his situation was critical, but he was spared, thanks to the friendship of the painter Jacques-Louis David, who obtained for him a commission to furnish designs for republican costumes. When the Revolution was over, Denon was one of the bands of eminent men who frequented the house of Joséphine de Beauharnais. Here he met Napoleon, to whose fortunes he wisely attached himself.

== Egypt and the Louvre ==
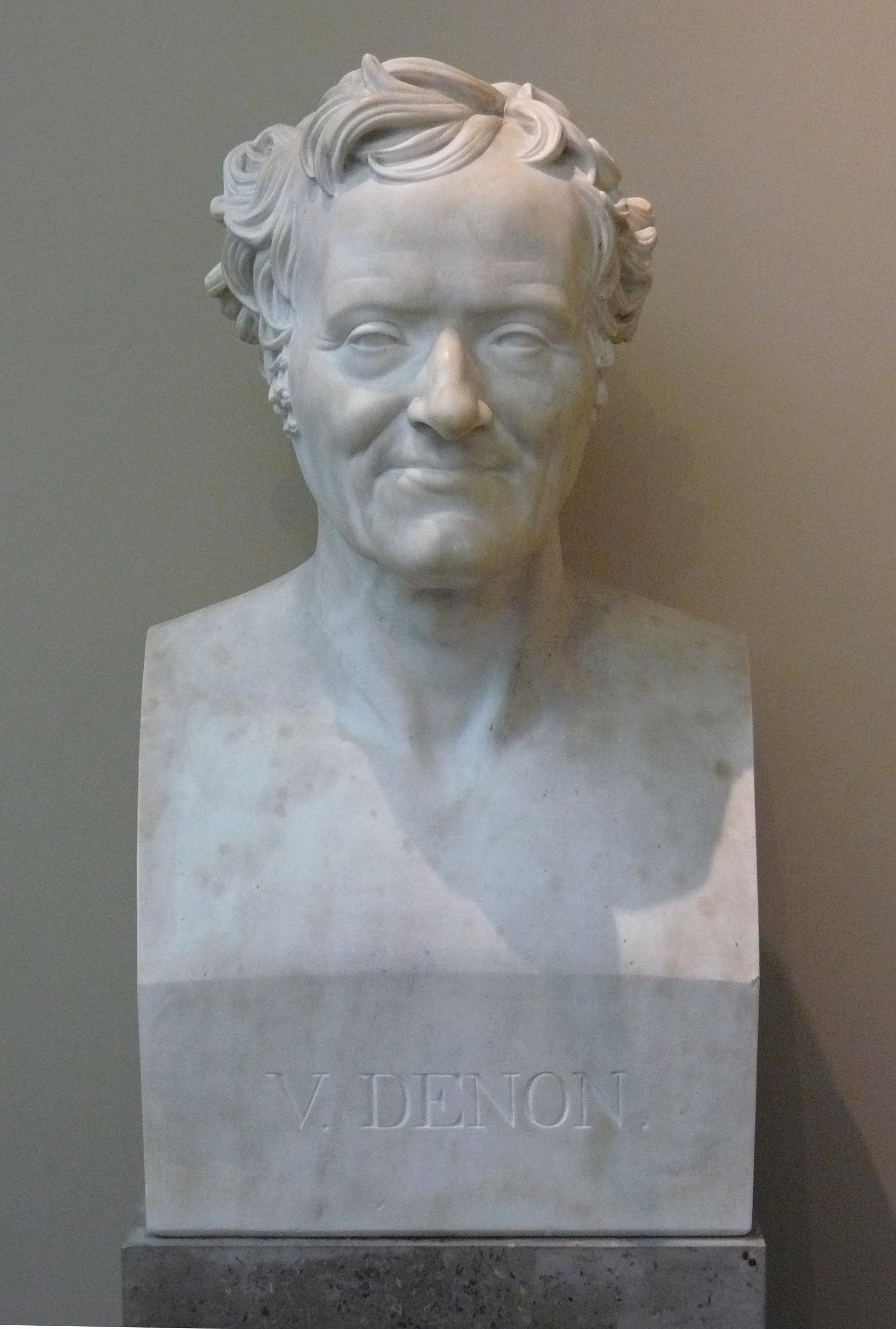
Commemorative bust by Joseph Charles Marin, shown at the Salon of 1827 (Louvre)

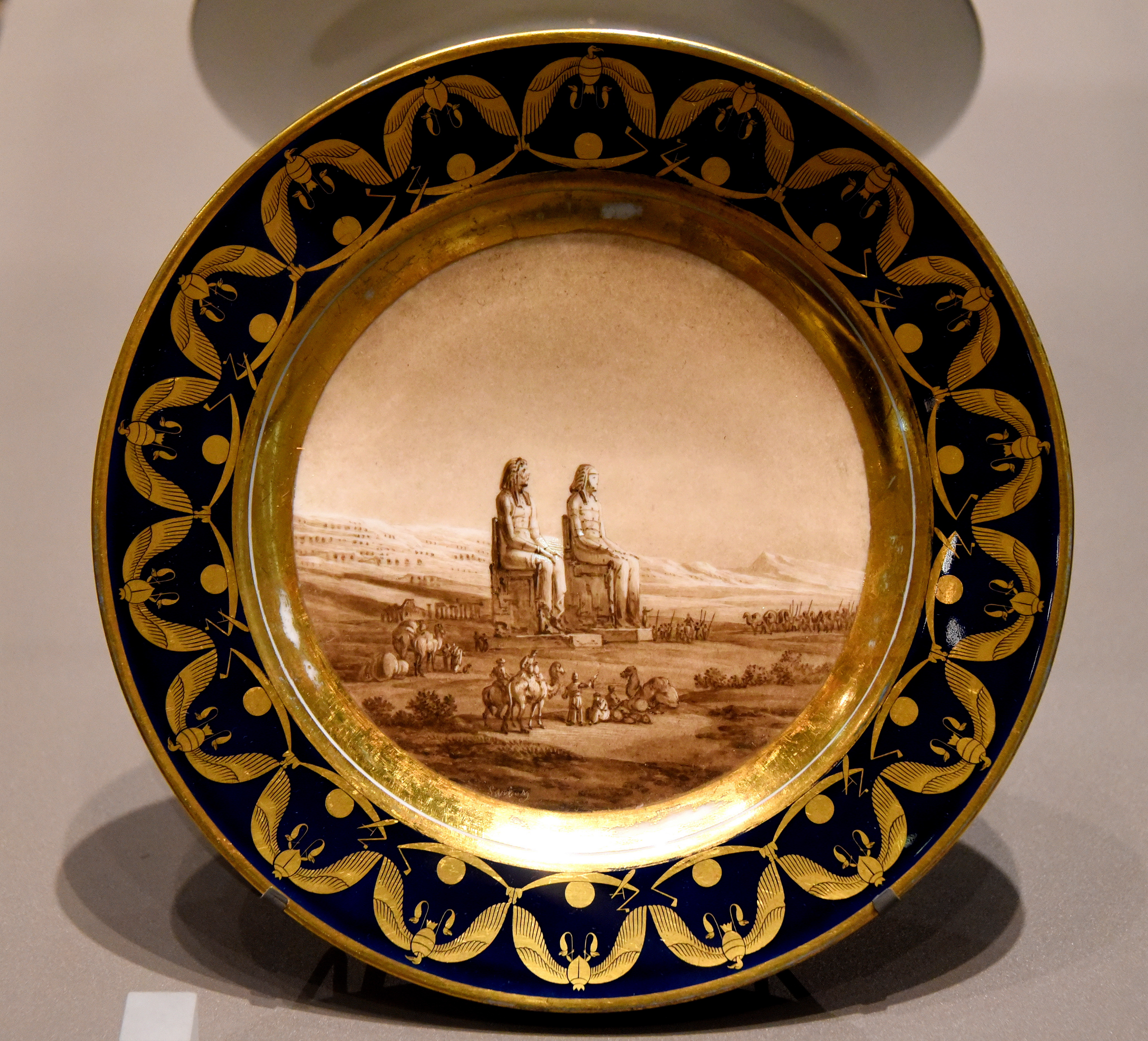
Plate showing statues of Amenhotep III at Luxor, Egypt. Commissioned by Napoleon as a present to Joséphine but she rejected it. French, Victoria and Albert Museum, London

At Bonaparte's invitation he joined the expedition to Egypt as part of the arts and literature section of the Institut d'Égypte, and thus found the opportunity of gathering the materials for his most important literary and artistic work. He accompanied General Desaix to Upper Egypt, and made numerous sketches of the monuments of ancient art, sometimes under the very fire of the enemy. The results were published in his Voyage dans la basse et la haute Egypte (Journey in Lower and Upper Egypt), published as two volumes in 1802. The work crowned his reputation both as an archaeologist and as an artist, and sparked Egyptian Revival architecture and decorative arts.

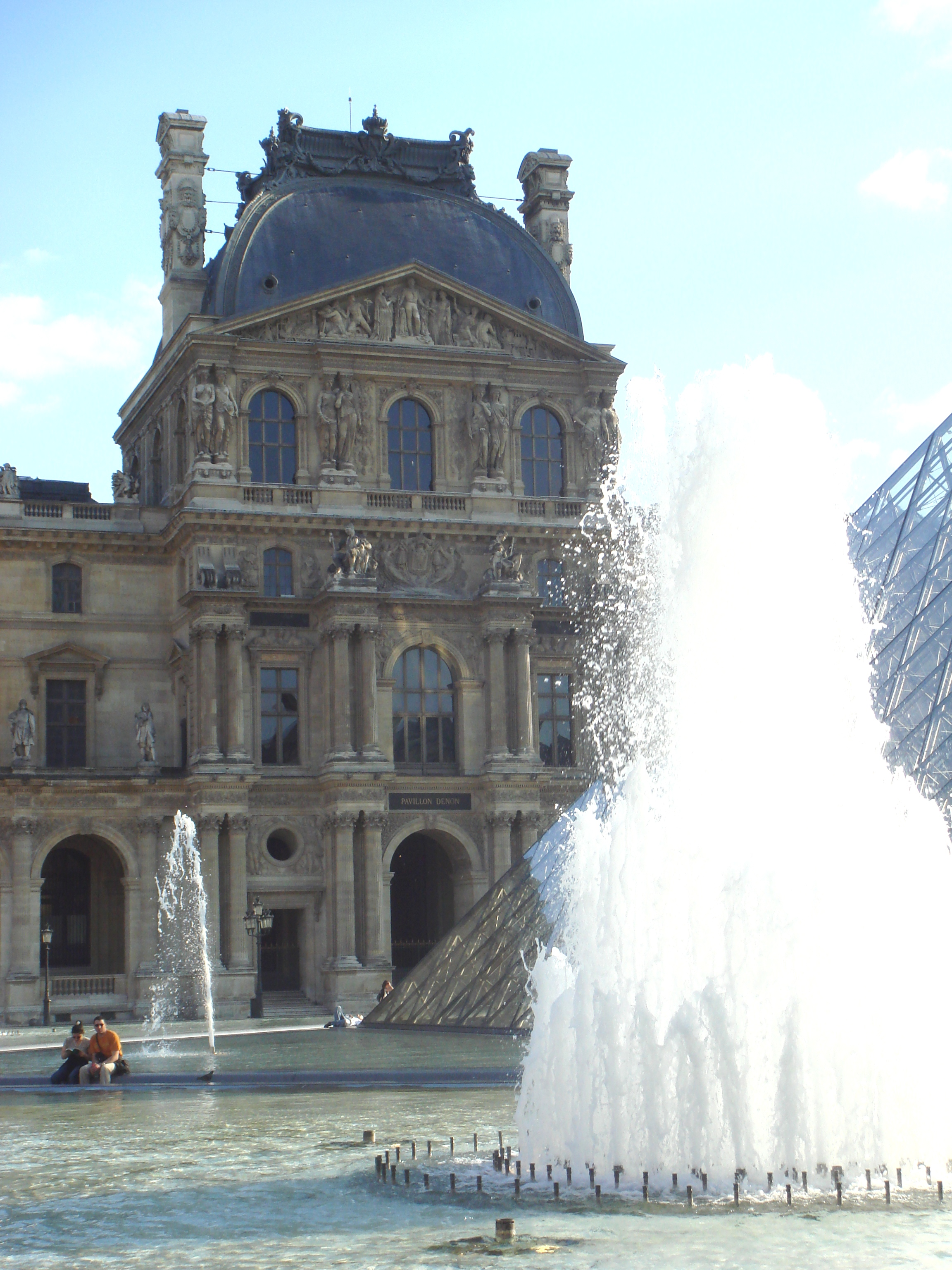
Pavillon Denon at the Louvre

On 19 November 1802, he was appointed by Napoleon to the important office of director-general of museums and head of the new Musée Napoléon, which he filled until the Allied occupation of Paris in 1814, when he had to retire. He was a devoted servant of Napoleon, on whose behalf he personally looted vast numbers of works of art in Italy, the Low Countries and Germany and, through agents (including Francisco Goya), in Spain, for the Musée Napoleon in Paris. Many of these remain in the Louvre, and elsewhere in France, today. In particular, Denon was one of the first men to appreciate the importance of the Italian 'primitives'. The majority of those now in the Louvre were looted by Denon during a sweep he made through Italy in 1812. They were publicly paraded, with elephants and other wild animals, like a Roman triumph, through the streets of Paris, before being deposited in the Louvre.

In 1803, to gratify Napoleon's anti-English sentiments, Denon proposed a new square in Paris, near the Abbey of Saint-Germain, to be named after William the Conqueror with a statue of William in the centre. There were no known effigies of William in Paris, but Denon proposed to fake the discovery of a statue in the ruins of an old chateau near Cocherel in Normandy. There was a statue in 11th-century costume in the cellars of the Musée des Monuments français and Denon proposed to take it to Normandy, supply a pedestal with a suitable inscription, "discover" the statue and ship it up the Seine to Paris in a blaze of publicity. Napoleon wisely refused to be tempted by this project and it was abandoned.

Denon took full opportunity, while working for Napoleon, to assemble for himself an enormous collection of paintings, drawings, prints, books, statuary and objets d'art. This collection was sold at auction over several days after Denon's death. In 1810 he also assisted the Hermitage Museum in its acquisition of Rosso Fiorentino's Madonna and Child with Cherubs in Paris.

== Retirement and death ==
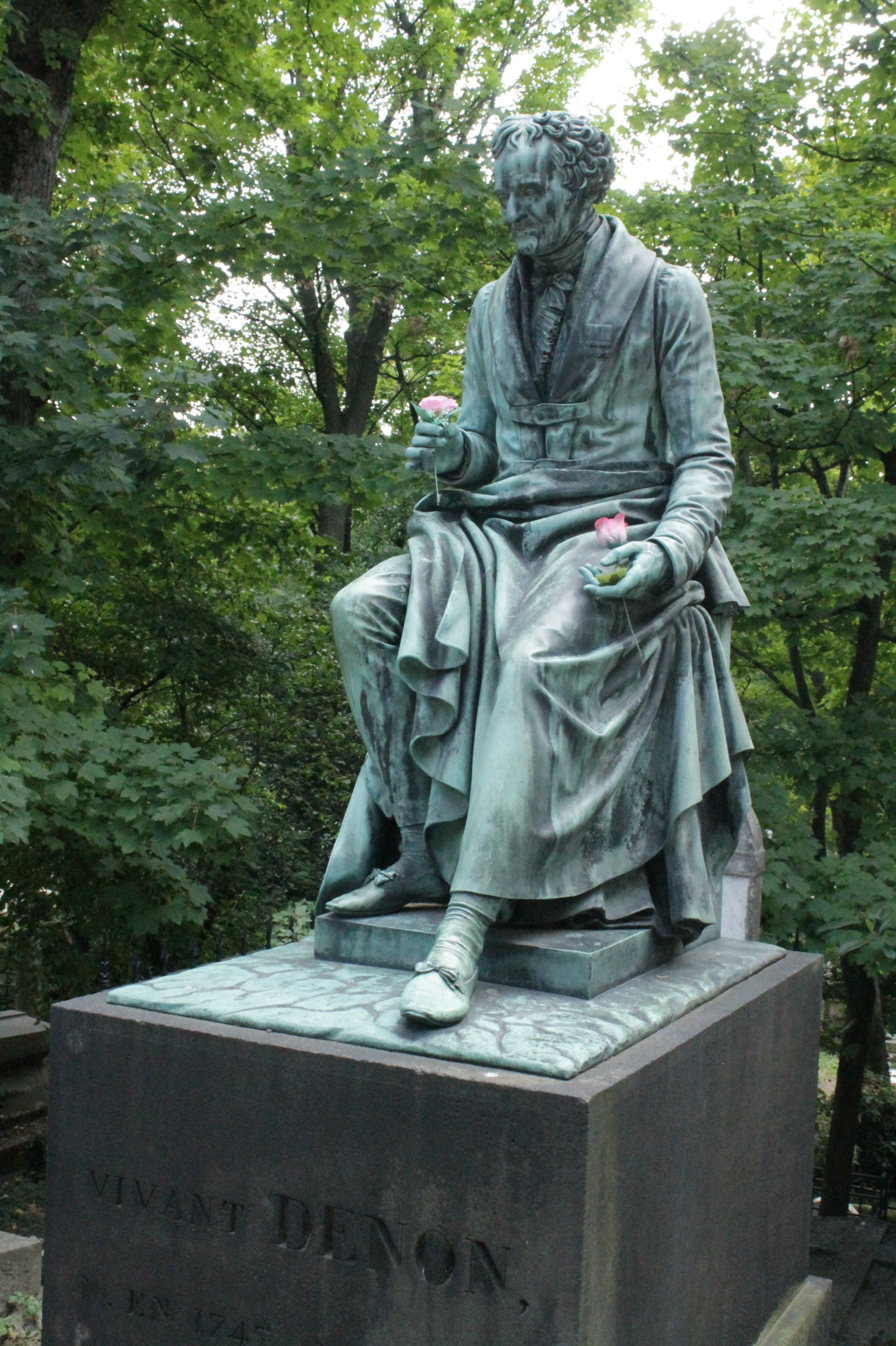
The grave of Vivant Denon, Pere Lachaise Cemetery in Paris

At the Bourbon Restoration of 1814 Denon was confirmed in place for a year, but was too closely associated with the former regime to keep the position for long, and was replaced by Auguste de Forbin in 1816. After his forced retirement he began an illustrated history of ancient and modern art, in which he had the cooperation of several skillful engravers. He died at Paris in 1825, leaving the work unfinished. It was published posthumously, with an explanatory text by Amaury Duval, under the title Monuments des arts du dessin chez les peuples tant anciens que modernes, recueillis par Vivant Denon in 1829. Denon was also the author of an erotic novel, Point de lendemain, published in 1777 (in 1812 as a separate work), and of a number of erotic etchings.

He died in Paris and is buried in the world famous Père Lachaise Cemetery, where his grave is marked by a life-sized statue.

== Legacy ==
In Napoleon III's Louvre expansion in the 1850s, Denon's name was given to the central pavilion of the Nouveau Louvre's South Wing. In the Grand Louvre project of the late 1980s, the entire South Wing of the Louvre Palace was named after him (aile Denon, echoing Richelieu to the North and Sully to the East) as part of a signposting concept developed by the Carbone Smolan Agency.

== Works ==
- Vivant Denon (1803). Travels in Upper and Lower Egypt during the campaigns of General Bonaparte in that country. Vol. I. Translator Arthur Aikin. Heard and Forman, for Samuel Campbell.
- Vivant Denon (1803). Travels in Upper and Lower Egypt during the campaigns of General Bonaparte in that country. Vol. II. Translator Arthur Aikin. Heard and Forman, for Samuel Campbell.
- Vivant Denon (2009). Peter Brooks (ed.). No Tomorrow. Translator Lydia Davis. New York: New York Review of Books. ISBN 978-1-59017-326-8.
- Claude Joseph Dorat (1928). Never again!: (Point de lendemain) and other stories. Translator Eric Sutton. Chapman & Hall, ltd. A note at the beginning of this book states 'Point De Lendemain, the authorship of which has also been attributed to Vivant Denon was first published in 1777'. Hence the authorship being stated as Dorat in Sutton's translation.
- Vivant Denon (1876). Point de lendemain: conte dédiée à la reine. I. Liseux. "Point de lendemain."

== In fiction ==
Anthony O'Neill included the character of Vivant Denon in his novel The Empire of Eternity, in which he is portrayed as bisexual.

Lee Langley has written a biographical novel of Denon's life, A conversation on the Quai Voltaire.

Ruth McKenney also includes the character of Vivant Denon in her novel Mirage.

Milan Kundera's Slowness (1995) includes a rewriting of Vivant-Denon's Point de lendemain.
