= Fra Bartolomeo =

Italian Dominican lay brother and Renaissance painter (1472–1517)

Fra Bartolomeo, O.P.
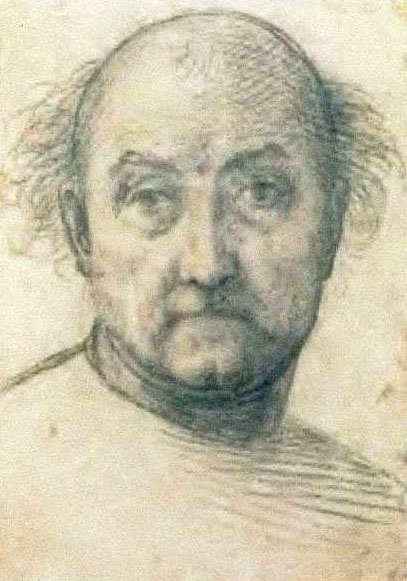
- Presumed portrait of Fra Bartolomeo
- Born: Baccio della Porta; 28 March 1472; Savignano di Prato, Republic of Florence
- Died: 31 October 1517 (aged 45); Florence, Republic of Florence

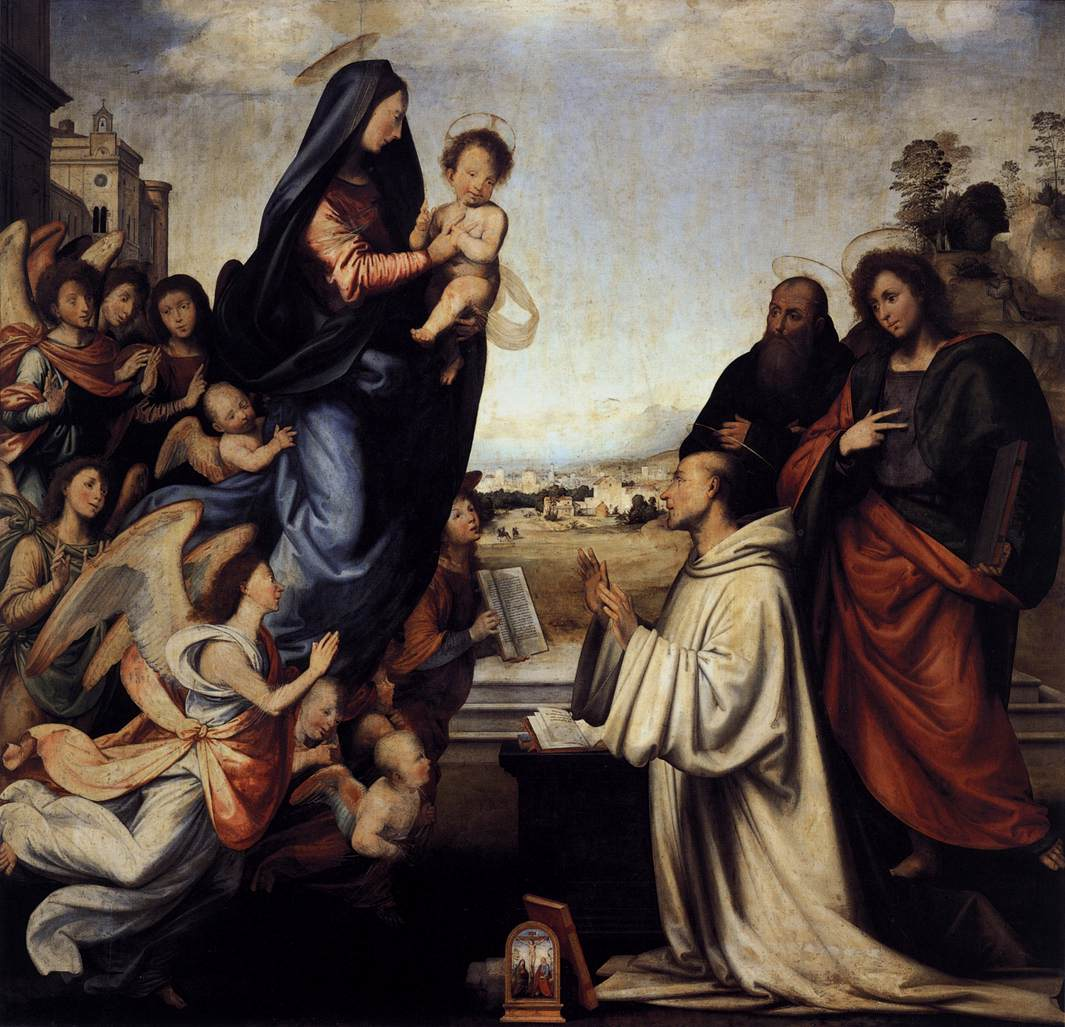
Apparition of the Virgin to St Bernard (1504–1507), Uffizi

Fra Bartolomeo or Bartolommeo, O.P. (UK: /ˌbɑːrtɒləˈmeɪoʊ/, US: /-toʊl-/, Italian: [bartolo(m)ˈmɛːo]; 28 March 1472 – 31 October 1517), also known as Bartolommeo di Pagholo, Bartolommeo di San Marco, Bartolomeo di Paolo di Jacopo del Fattorino, and his original nickname Baccio della Porta, was an Italian Renaissance painter of religious subjects. He spent all his career in Florence until his mid-forties, when he travelled to work in various cities, as far south as Rome. He trained with Cosimo Rosselli and in the 1490s fell under the influence of Savonarola, which led him to become a Dominican lay brother in 1500, renouncing painting for several years. Typically his paintings are of static groups of figures in subjects such as the Virgin and Child with Saints.

He was instructed to resume painting for the benefit of his order in 1504, and then developed an idealized High Renaissance style, seen in his Vision of St Bernard of that year, now in poor condition but whose "figures and drapery move with a seraphic grace that must have struck the young Raphael with the force of revelation". He remained friends with Raphael, and each influenced the other.

His portrait of Savonarola remains the best known image of the reformer. Fra Bartolomeo painted both in oils and fresco, and some of his drawings are pure landscape sketches that are the earliest of this type from any Italian artist.

== Life ==
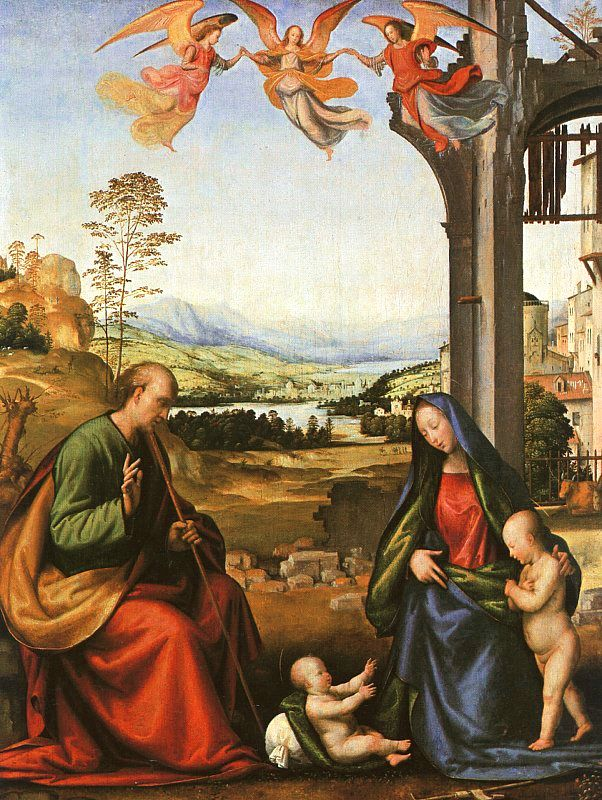
Holy Family with the Infant St John

He was born in Savignano di Prato, Tuscany. He received the nickname of Baccio della Porta ("Baccio of the Gate"), for his house was near the Gate of San Pier Gattolini. (Note: "Baccio" is an Italian diminutive for "Bartolommeo".)

Starting from 1483 or 1484, by recommendation of Benedetto da Maiano, he apprenticed in the workshop of Cosimo Rosselli. In 1490 or 1491 he began a collaboration with Mariotto Albertinelli. In the late 1490s, Baccio was drawn to the teachings of Fra Girolamo Savonarola, who denounced what he viewed as vain and corrupt contemporary art. Savonarola argued for art serving as a direct visual illustration of the Bible to educate those unable to read the book. From 1498 is his famous portrait of Savonarola, now in the Museo Nazionale di San Marco in Florence. The following year he was commissioned a fresco of the Universal Judgement for the Ospedale di Santa Maria Nuova, completed by Albertinelli and Giuliano Bugiardini when Baccio became a Dominican friar on 26 July 1500. The following year he entered the convent of San Marco.

He renounced painting for several years, not resuming until 1504 when he became the head of the monastery workshop in obedience to his superior. In that year he began a Vision of St. Bernard for Bernardo Bianco's family chapel in the Badia Fiorentina, finished in 1507. Soon thereafter, Raphael visited Florence and befriended the friar. Bartolomeo learned perspective from the younger artist, while Raphael added skills in coloring and handling of drapery, which was noticeable in the works he produced after their meeting. With Raphael, he remained on the friendliest terms, and when he departed from Rome, left in his hands two unfinished pictures which Raphael completed.

At the beginning of 1508, Bartolomeo moved to Venice to paint a Holy Father, St. Mary Magdalene and St. Catherine of Siena for the Dominicans of San Pietro Martire in Murano, influenced somewhat by Venetian colorism. As the Dominicans did not pay for the work, he took it back to Lucca, where it can be seen now. Also in Lucca, in October 1509, he painted with Albertinelli an altarpiece of the Madonna and Child with Saints for the local cathedral. On 26 November 1510 Pier Soderini commissioned him an altarpiece for the Sala del Consiglio of Florence, now in the Museum of San Marco. Two years later he finished another altarpiece for the cathedral of Besançon.

In 1513, he went to Rome, where he painted a Peter and Paul, now in the Pinacoteca Vaticana, while from the following years are the St. Mark Evangelist of Palazzo Pitti in Florence and the frescoes in the Dominican convent of Pian di Mugnone, a frazione of Fiesole, just outside Florence. After a promised Feast of Venus for Duke Alfonso I d'Este of Ferrara, of which only drawings remain, his last work is a fresco of Noli me tangere also in Pian di Mugnone.

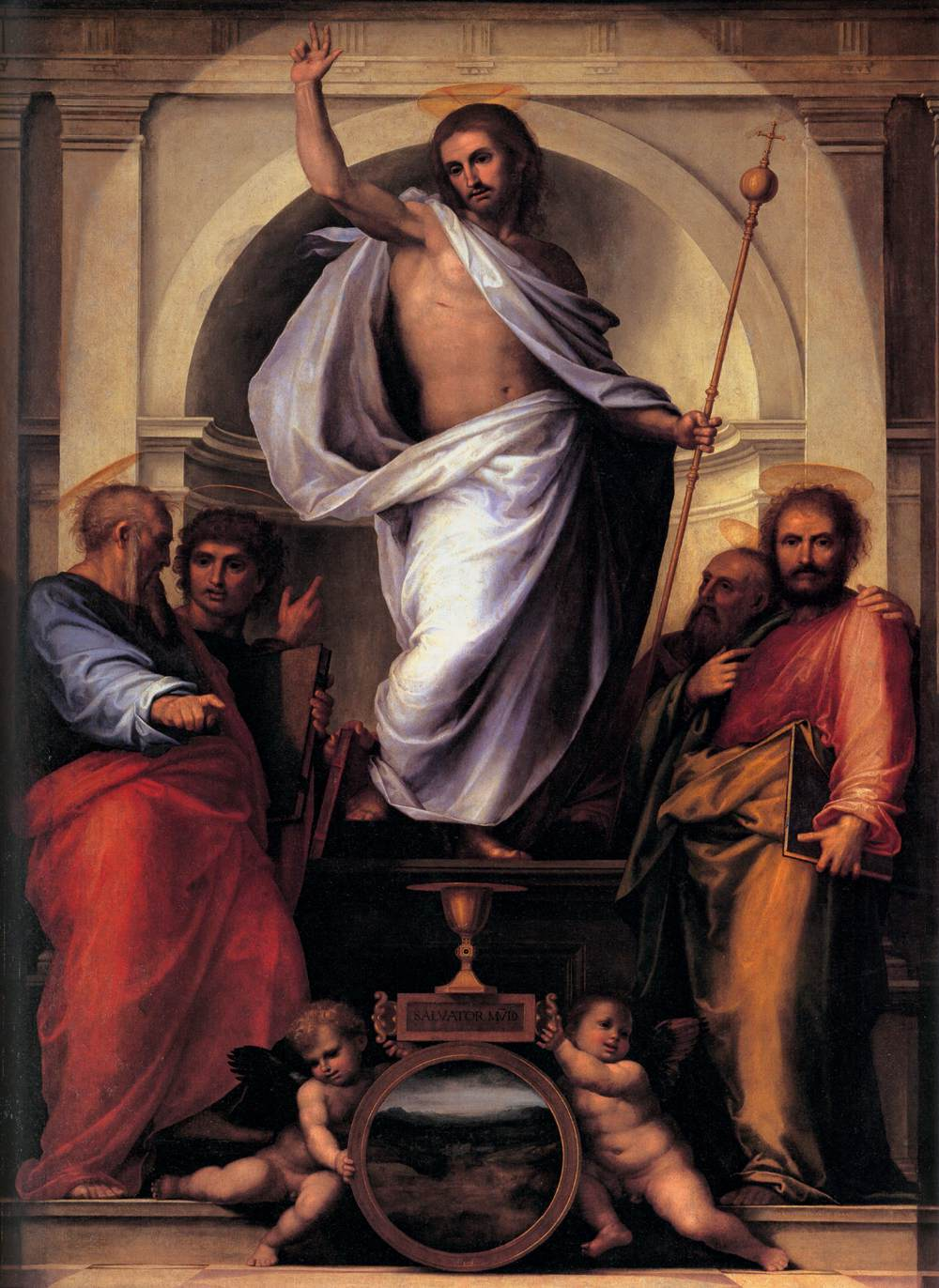
Fra Bartolomeo: Christ with the Four Evangelists

He died in Florence in 1517.

== Works ==
=== Style ===
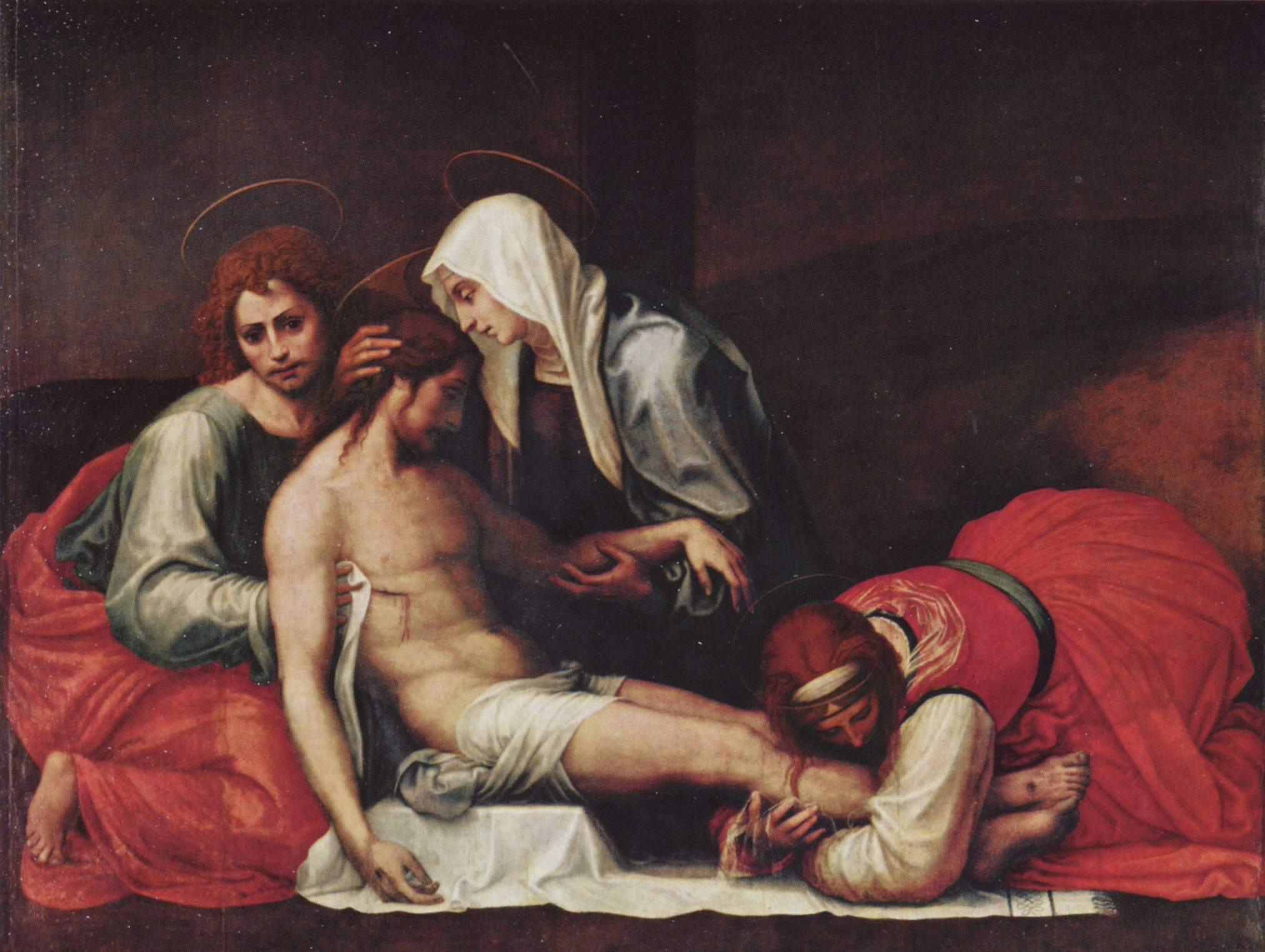
Pietà (1516). Palazzo Pitti, Florence.

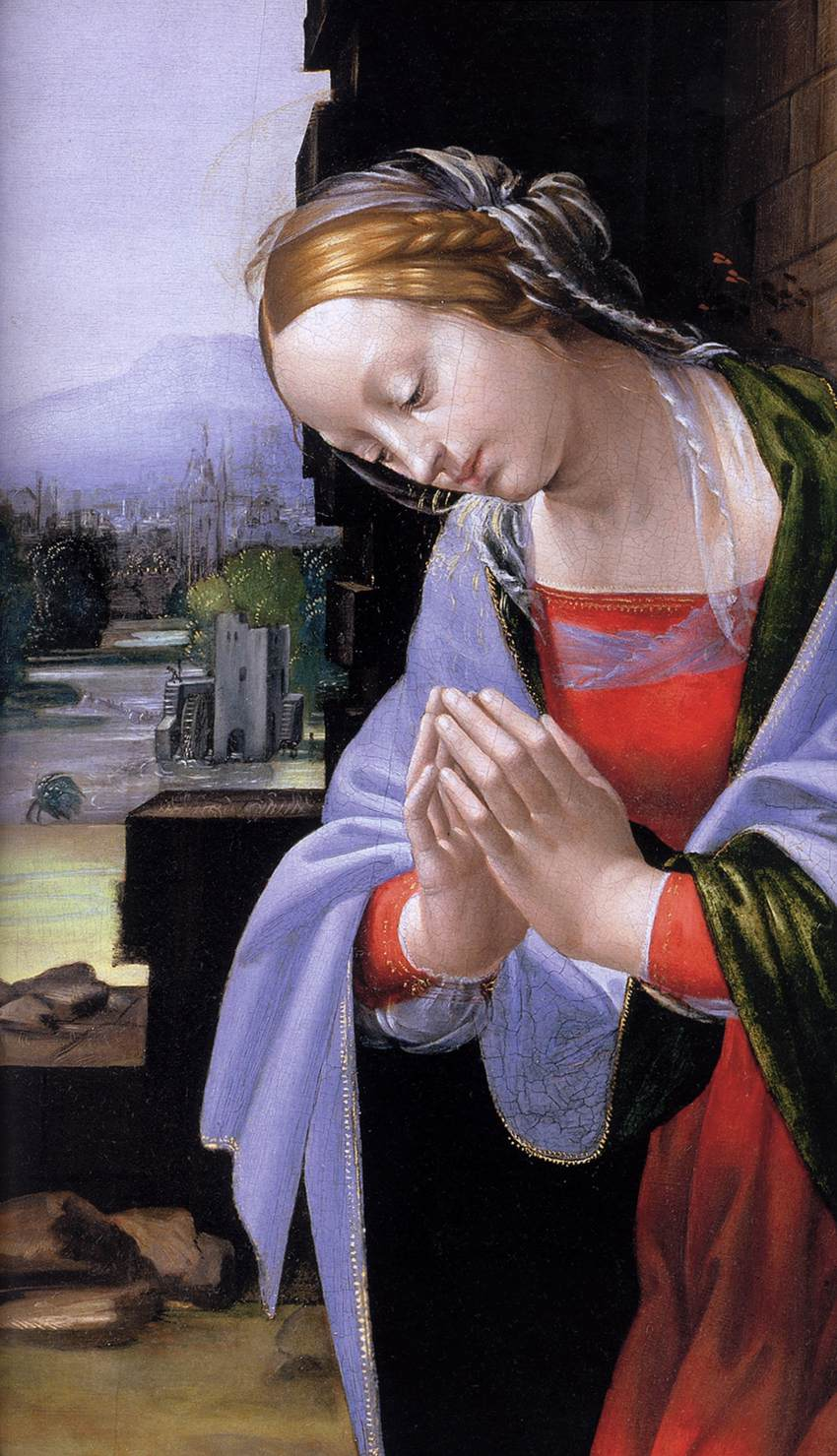
The Adoration of the Christ Child (detail)

Initially, his works showed the influence of Rosselli's assistant, Piero di Cosimo, and those of Domenico Ghirlandaio and Filippino Lippi. After his hiatus from 1500 to 1503, he seemed to change vision, taking from Raphael the representation of light and its effects over moving shapes.

Fra Bartolomeo's figures are generally small and draped. These qualities were alleged against him as defects, and to prove that his style was not the result of want of power, he painted the magnificent figure of the St Mark Evangelist (ranked as his masterpiece), and the undraped figure of Saint Sebastian. It is alleged that the latter was felt to be so strongly expressive of suffering and agony, that it was found necessary to remove it from the place where it had been exhibited in the chapel of a convent.

Bartolomeo was the first to introduce and use the lay-figure with joints.

Among his pupils were Cecchino del Frate, Benedetto Ciamfanini, Gabriel Rustici, Ridolfo Ghirlandaio (the son of Domenico Ghirlandaio), and Fra Paolo Pistolese.

== Works ==
All pieces listed are in oil on canvas.

- Pugliese Tabernacle, (c. 1497–1499), Uffizi, Florence
- Assumption of Mary (1508), oil on canvas, Kaiser Friedrich Museum, Berlin (destroyed in 1945)
- Madonna in Glory with Saints (1512, with Albertinelli), Cathedral of Besançon, France
- Holy Conversation (1512)
- Christ Supported by Two Angels (c. 1514), Casa Vasari, Arezzo
- St. Sebastian (1515), Alaffre Collection, Pézenas, France
Religious works

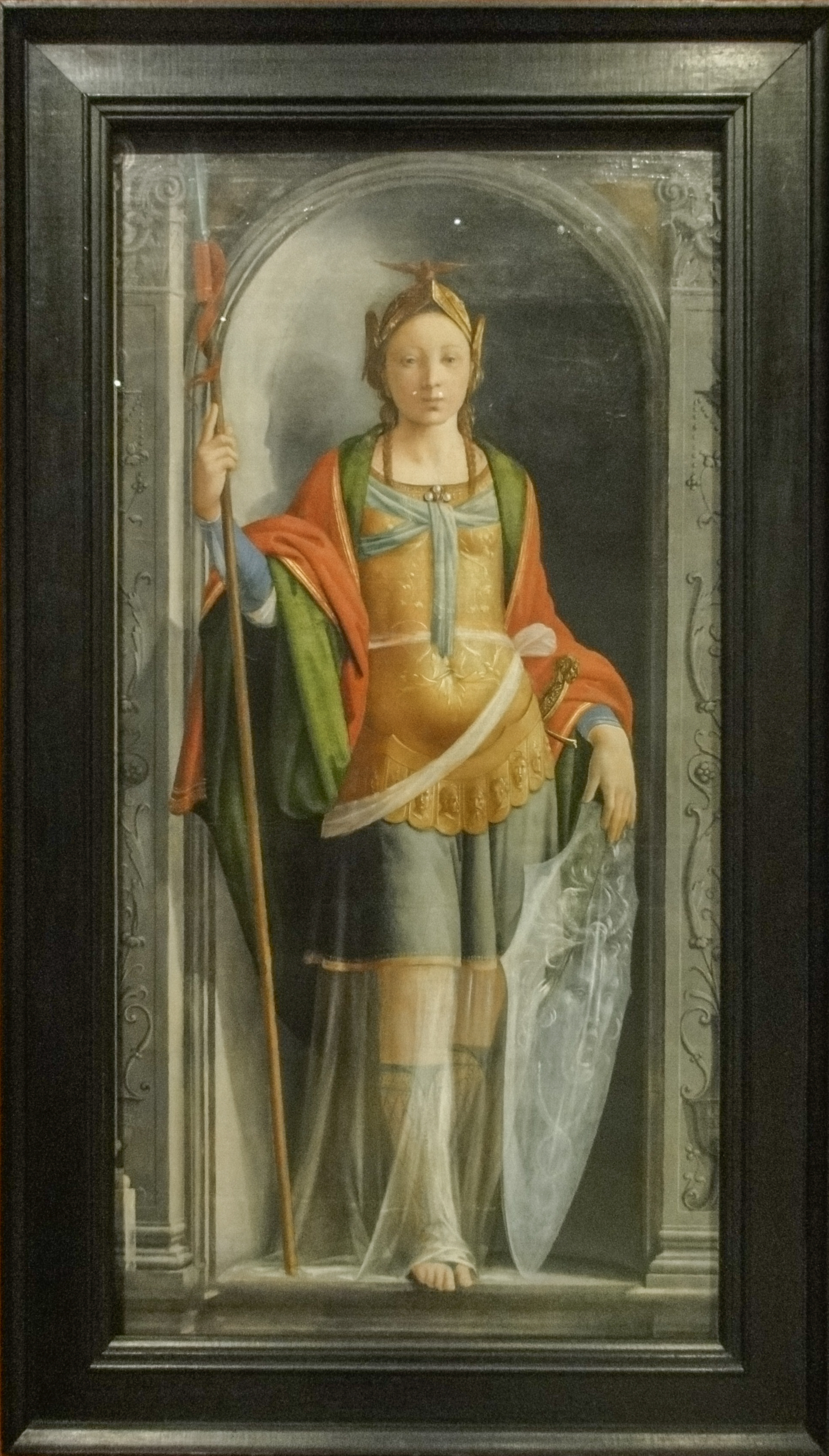
Minerva (1490), Louvre, Paris

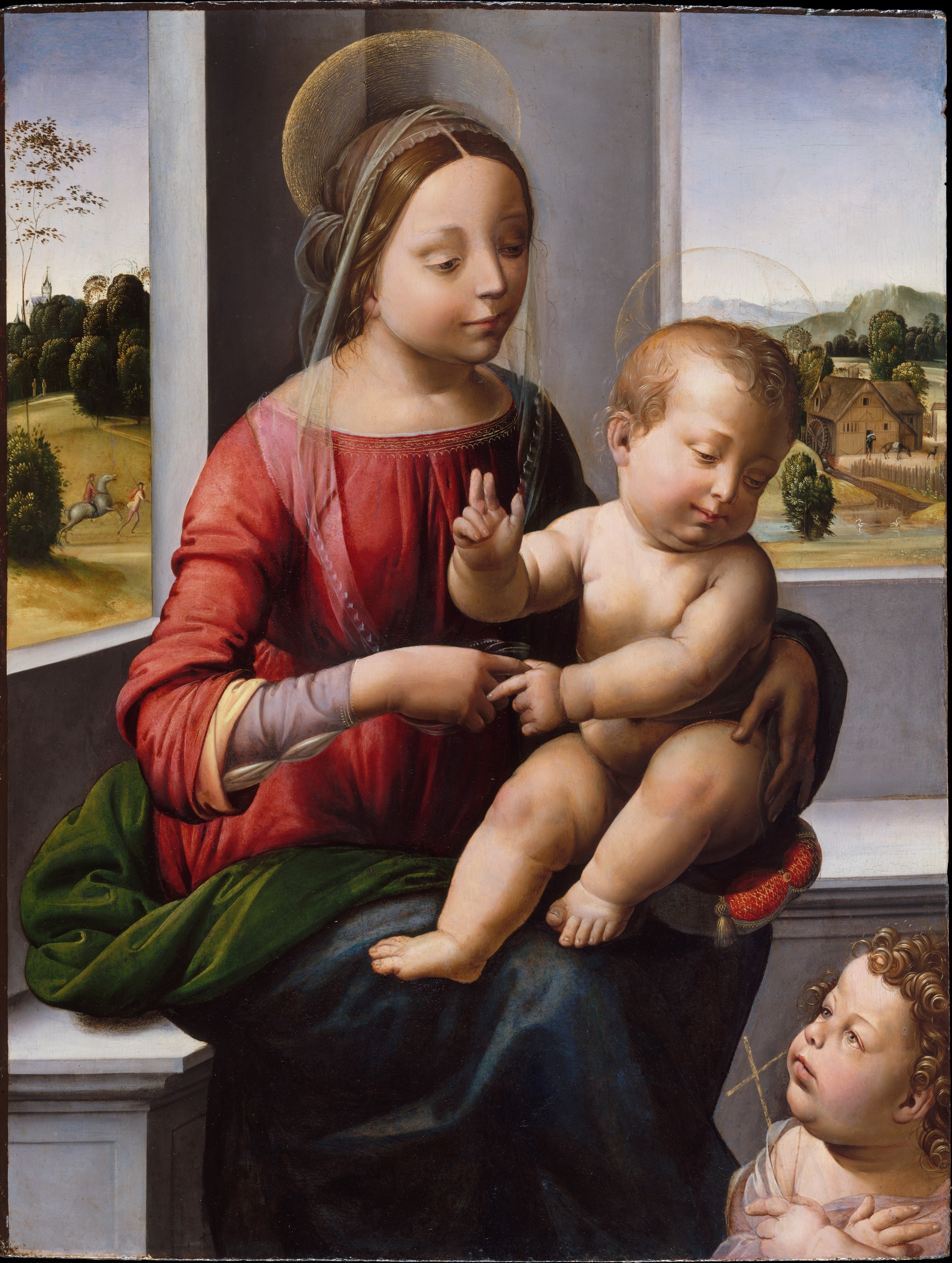
Madonna and Child with the Young Saint John the Baptist (1497), MET, New York

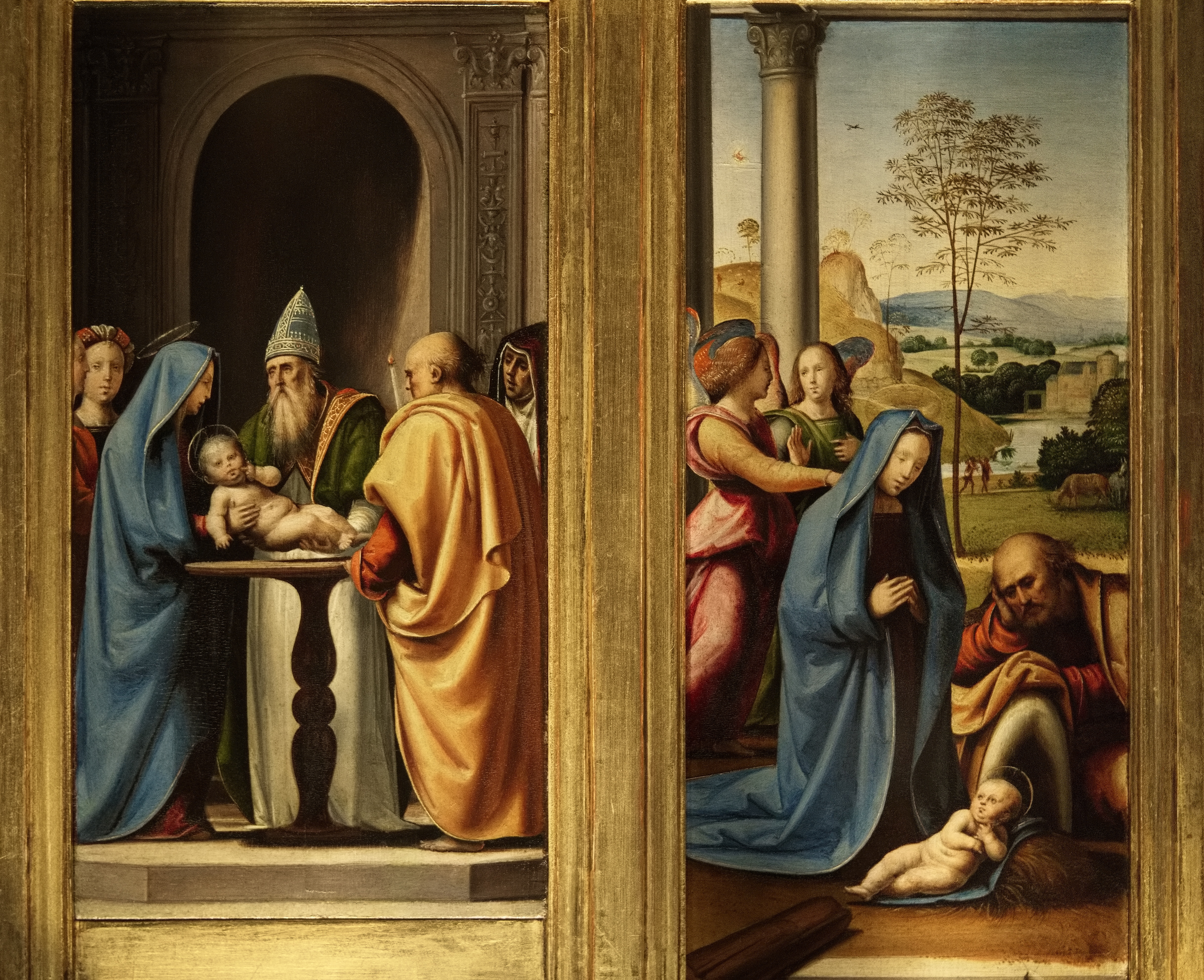
Tabernacolo del Pugliese (c. 1497–1499), Uffizi, Florence

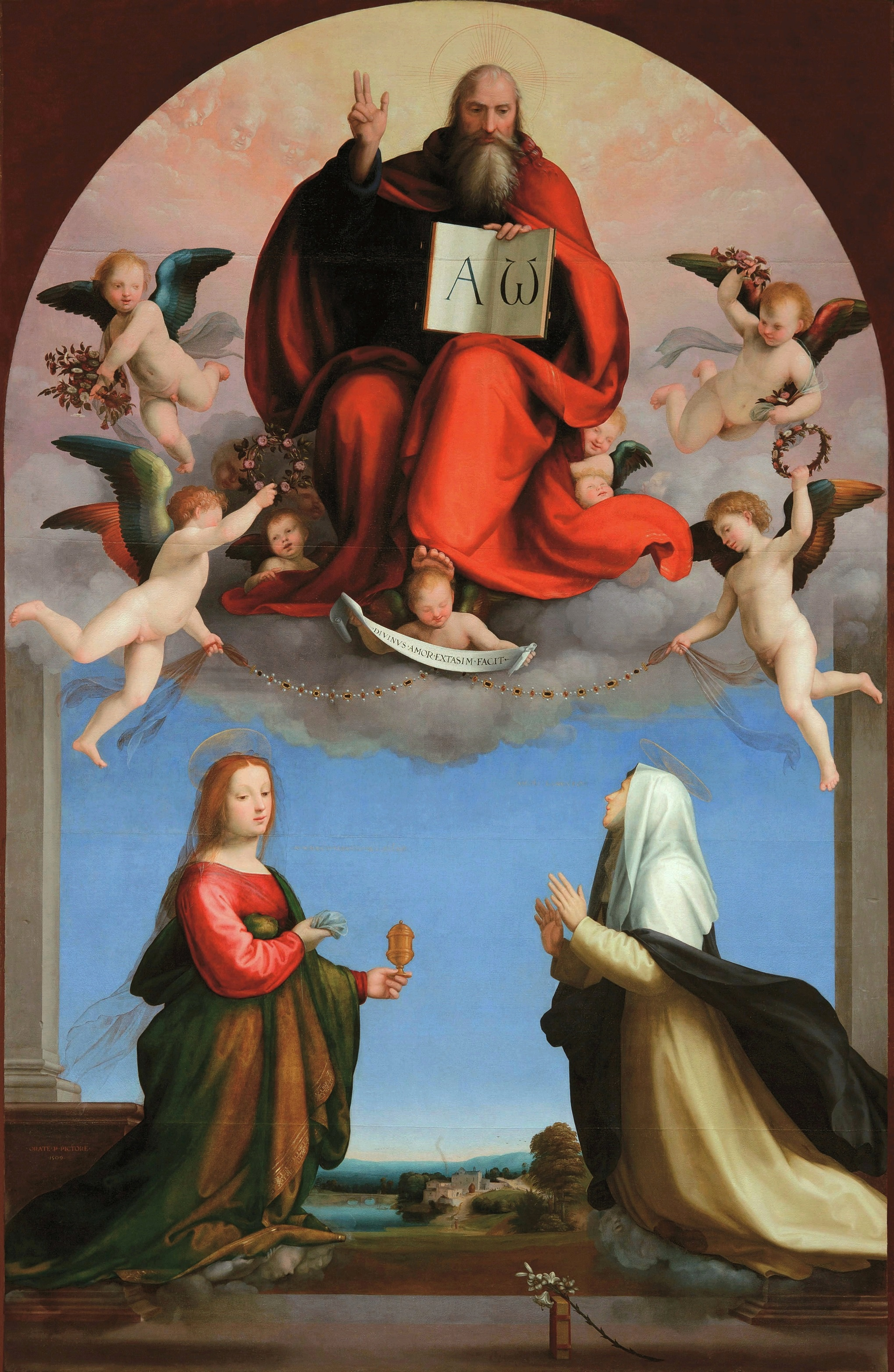
God the Father with Saints Catherine of Siena and Mary Magdalen (1509), for San Pietro Martire in Murano from San Romano, Lucca, Museo Nazionale di Villa Guinigi

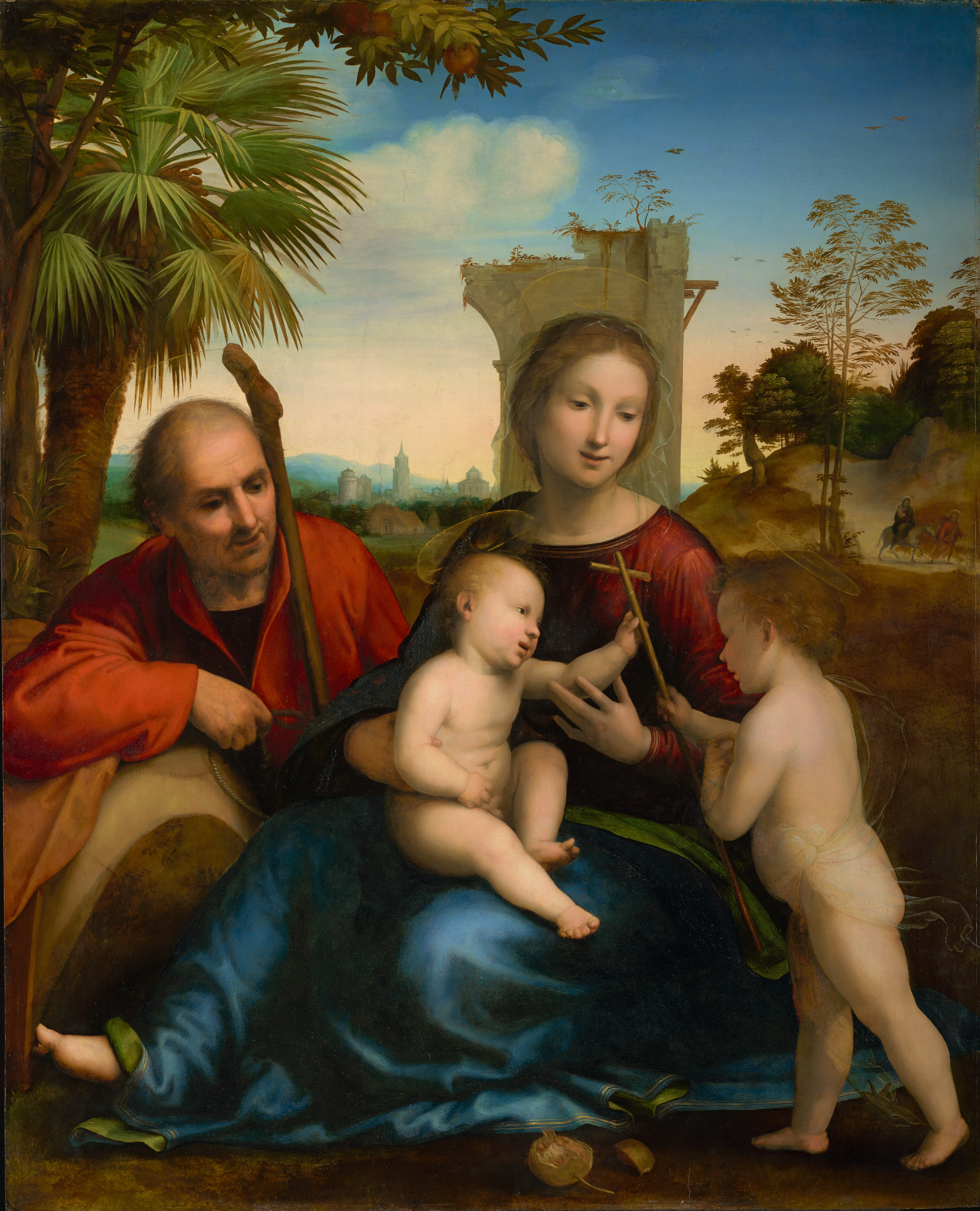
The Rest on the Flight into Egypt with Saint John the Baptist (c. 1509), Getty Museum, Los Angeles

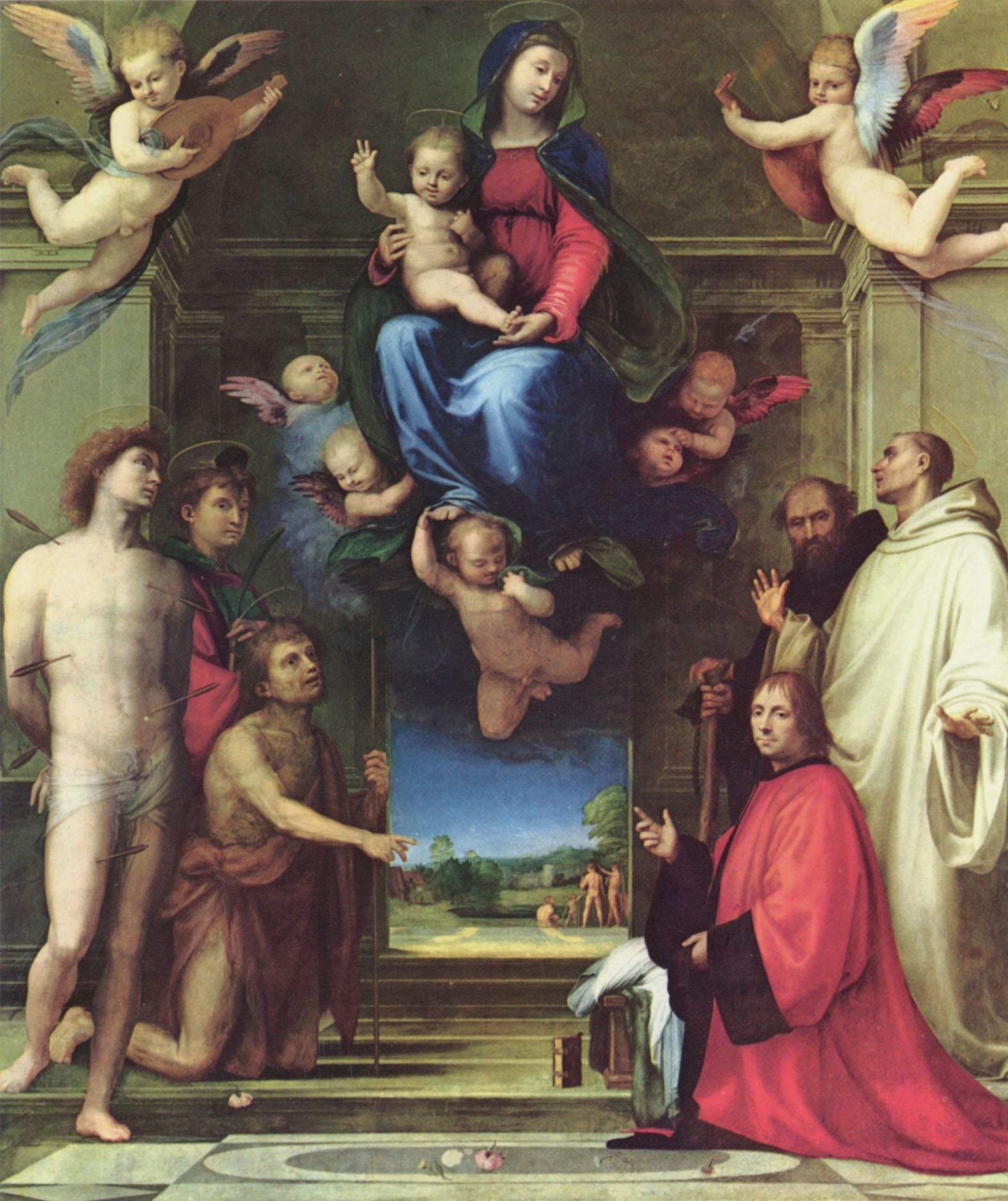
Madonna in Glory with Saints (1512), with Albertinelli, Besançon Cathedral

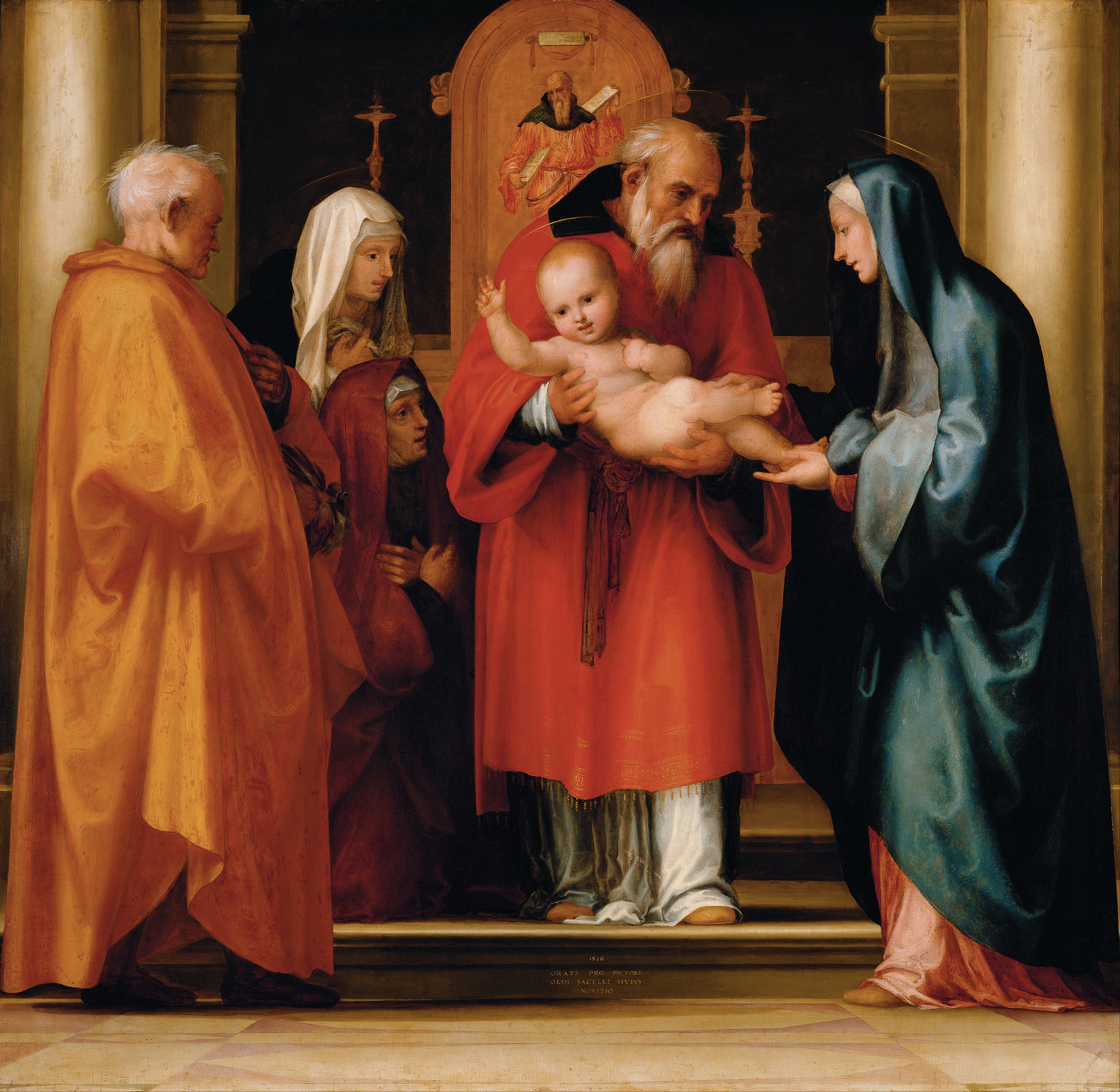
Scene with Christ in the Temple (1516), Kunsthistorisches Museum, Vienna

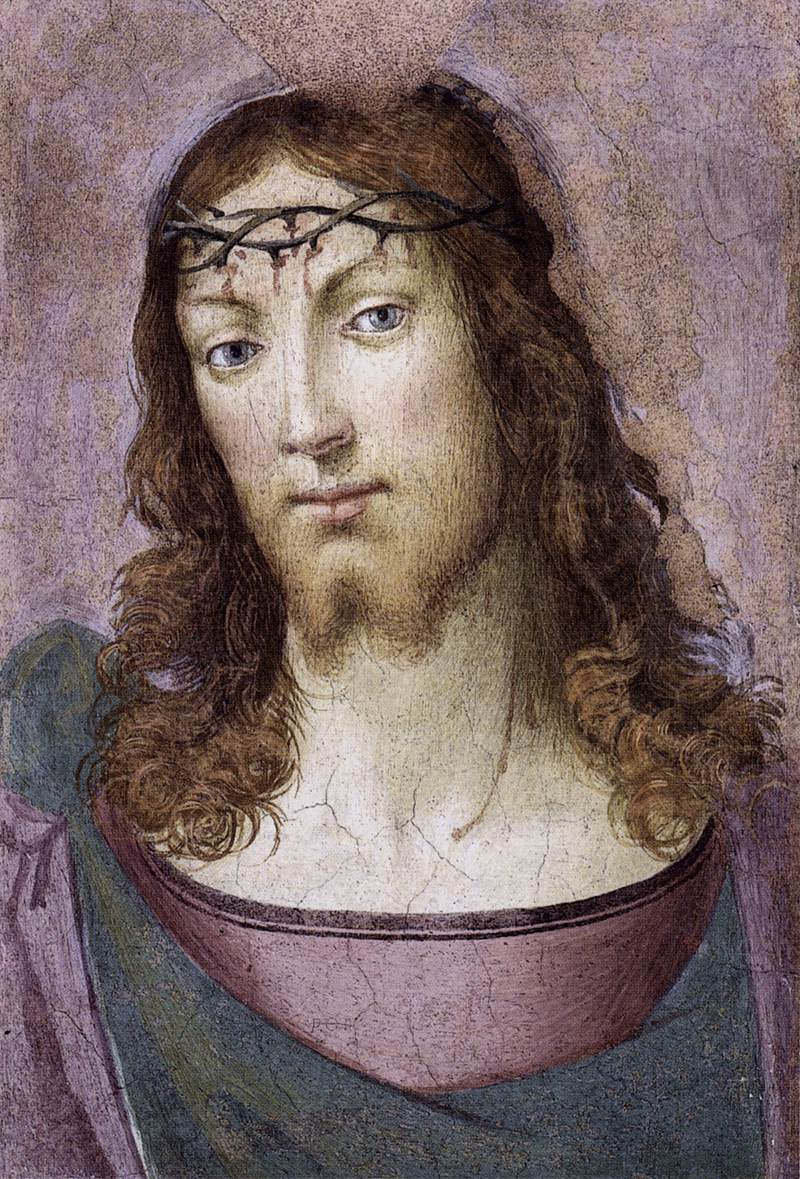
Christ Crowned with Thorns
Portraits, details

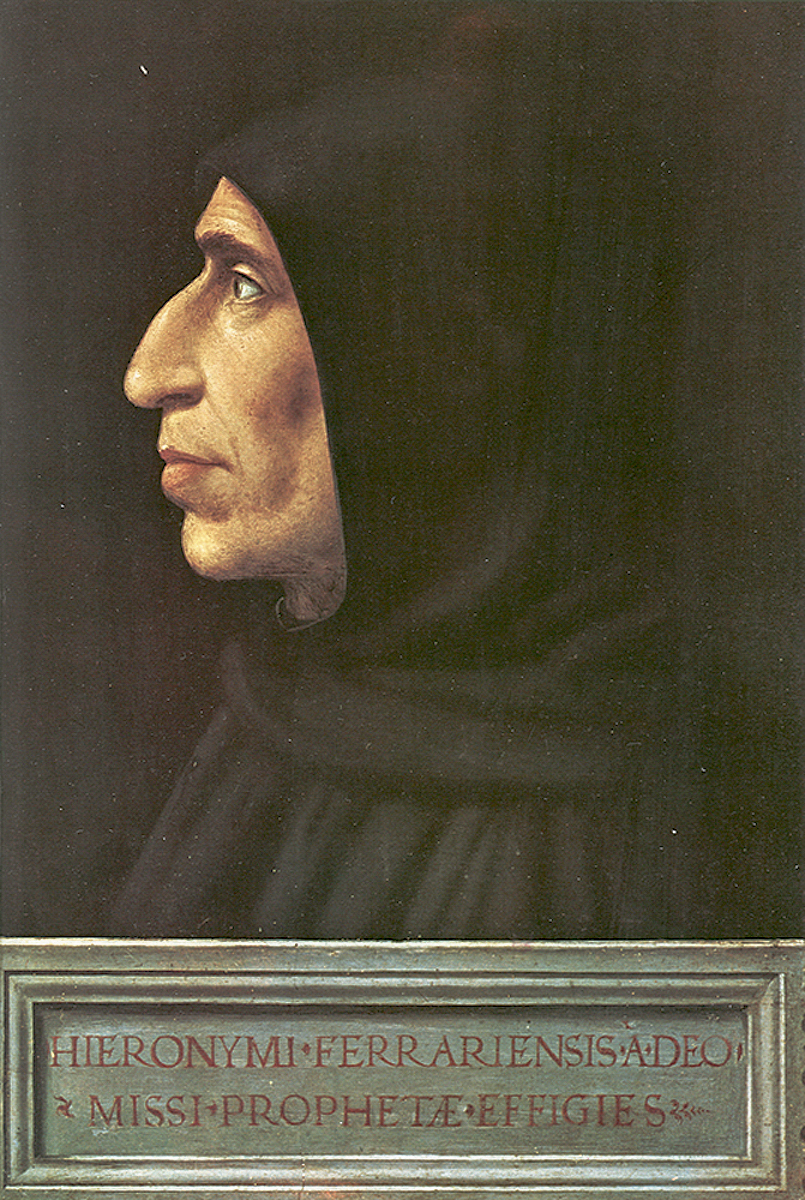
Girolamo Savonarola (1498), Museo Nazionale di San Marco, Florence

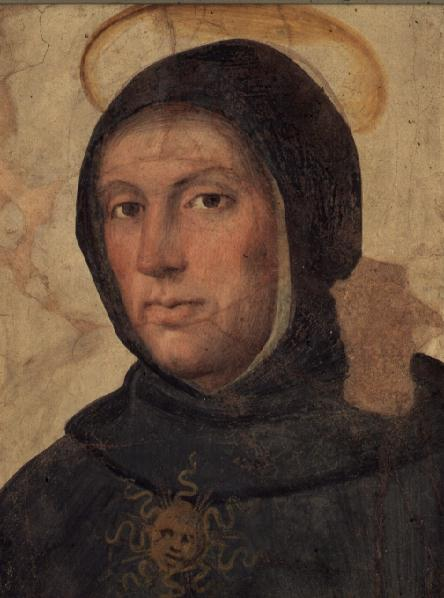
Thomas Aquinas

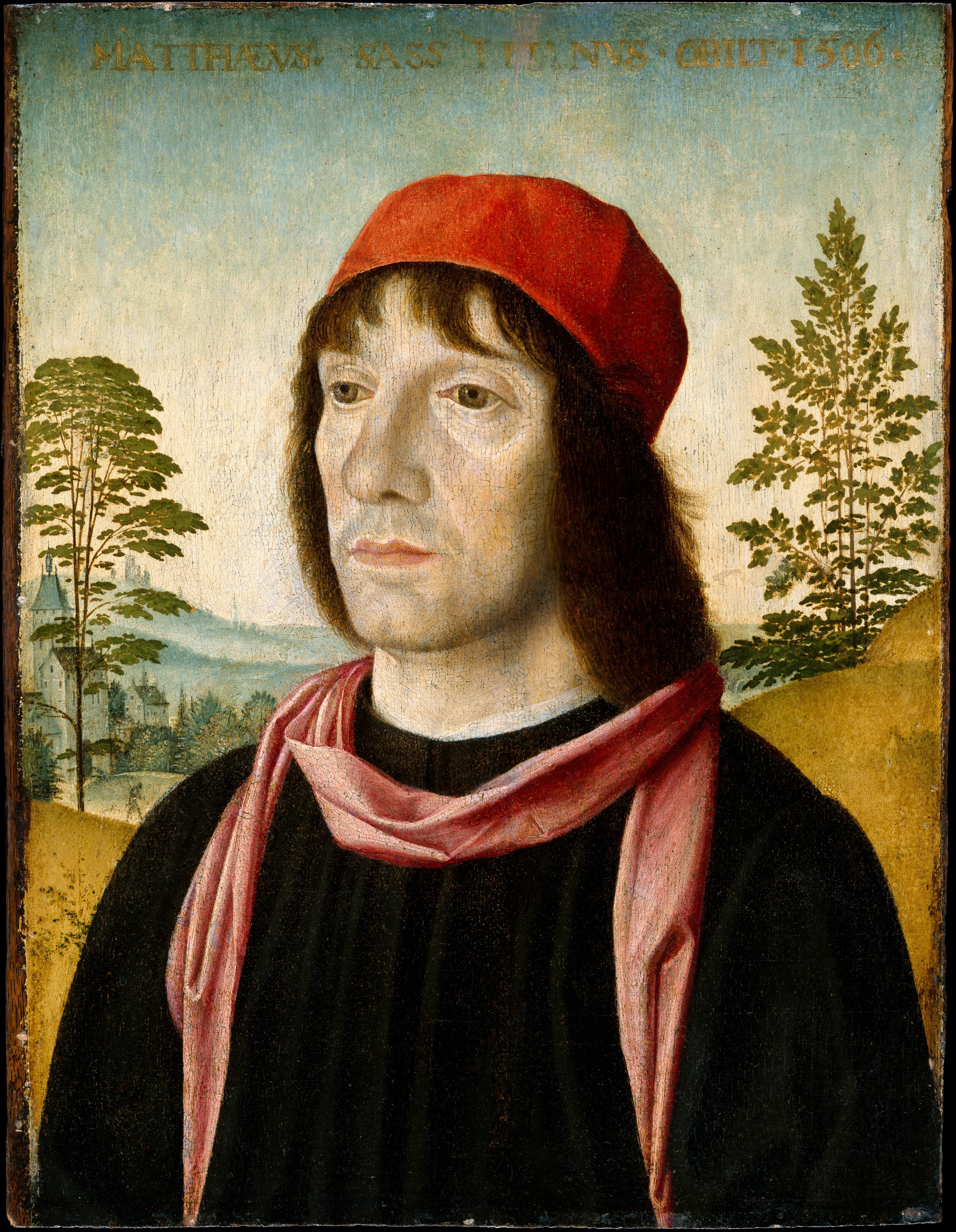
Portrait of a Man (1497–1517), MET, New York
