= Chapel of St Luke, Annunziata =

Chapel in Florence, Italy

Coordinates: 43.777344°N 11.261176°E

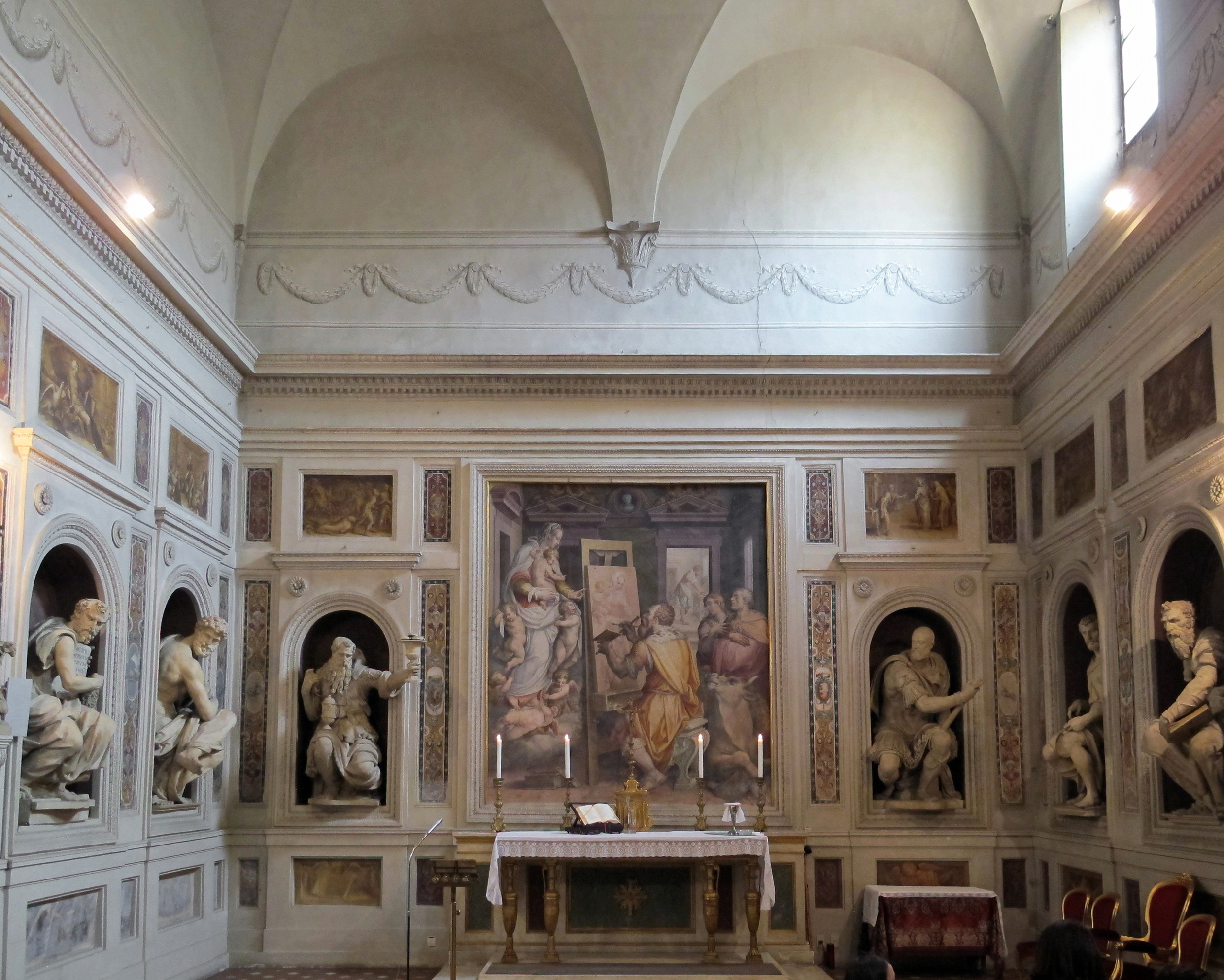
View of interior of Chapel

The Cappella di San Luca (Chapel of St Luke), also called dei Pittori is a chapel found in the cloisters of the convent of Santissima Annunziata in Florence, Italy. It was built to serve as the burial chapel for members of the Accademia delle Arti del Disegno, and was donated by the Servites to the Academy in a document from 1565. It contains a collection of terracota statues from a number of prominent Florentine Mannerist sculptors.

== History ==
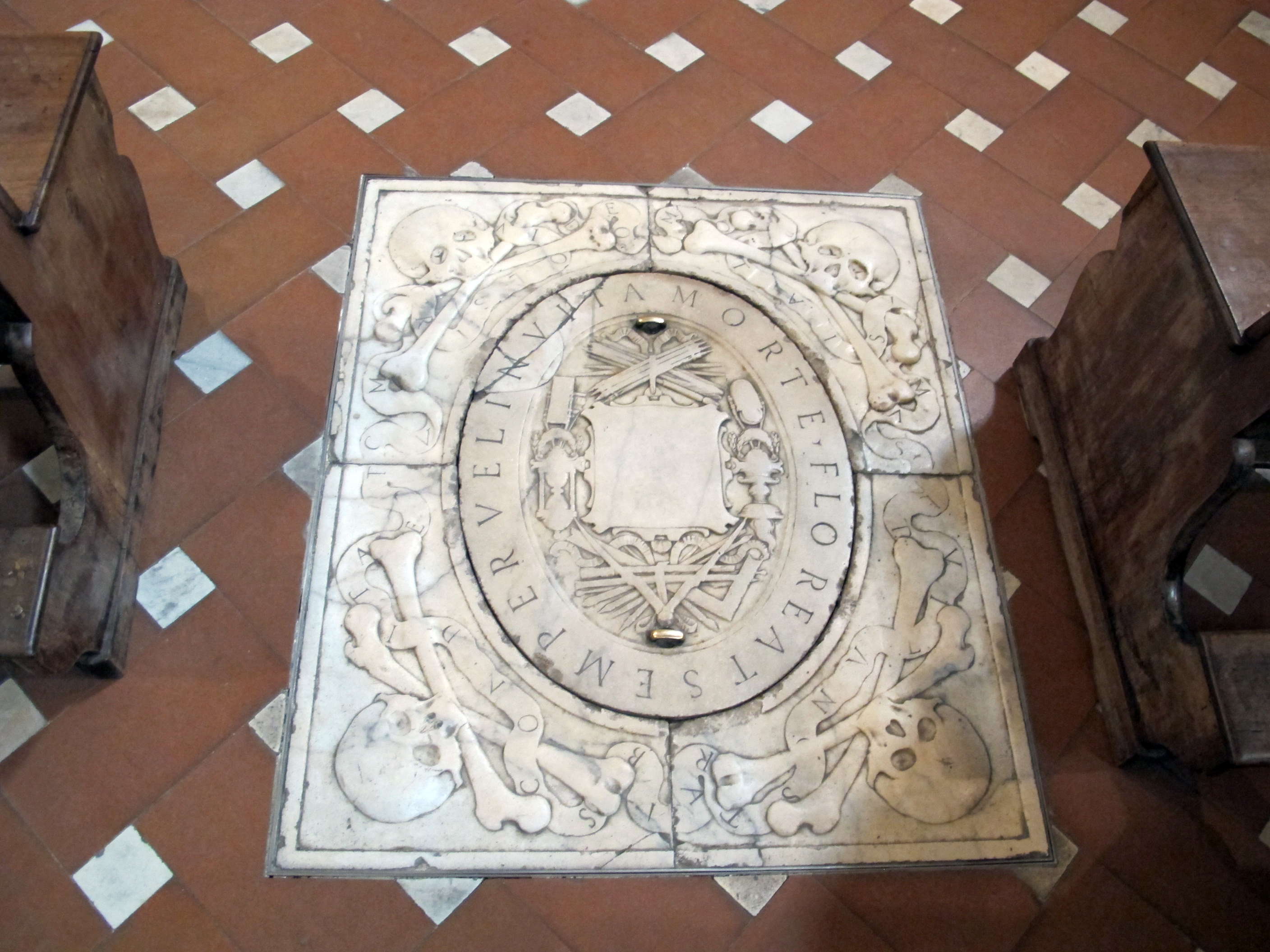
Plaque leading to burial crypt

The servite cleric and sculptor Giovanni Angelo Montorsoli arranged with Vincenzo Borghini and Giorgio Vasari to build a burial chapel for the Academy of Design, with the support of the Medici Duke. Immediately plans were also made to decorate the chapel. Originally, the chapel entrance was from the north, under the Trinity fresco by Allori, and the chapel was dedicated to the Trinity. But in time, the chapel became associated with St Luke, patron saint of painters. Tradition holds that the apostle Luke created the first painting of the Virgin Mary, a story depicted in the chapel's fresco on the east wall, painted by Vasari. During the Napoleonic occupation of Tuscany, the French archbishop named to lead the archdiocese of Florence, Eustache d'Osmond, was housed in the convent, made this his private chapel, and opened a new and present entrance.

Many Florentine artists were buried here, including Montorsoli, Pontormo, Cellini, Franciabigio, Lorenzo Bartolini, and as recently as 1983. The chapel still belongs to the Academy and holds memorial services here.

== Description ==
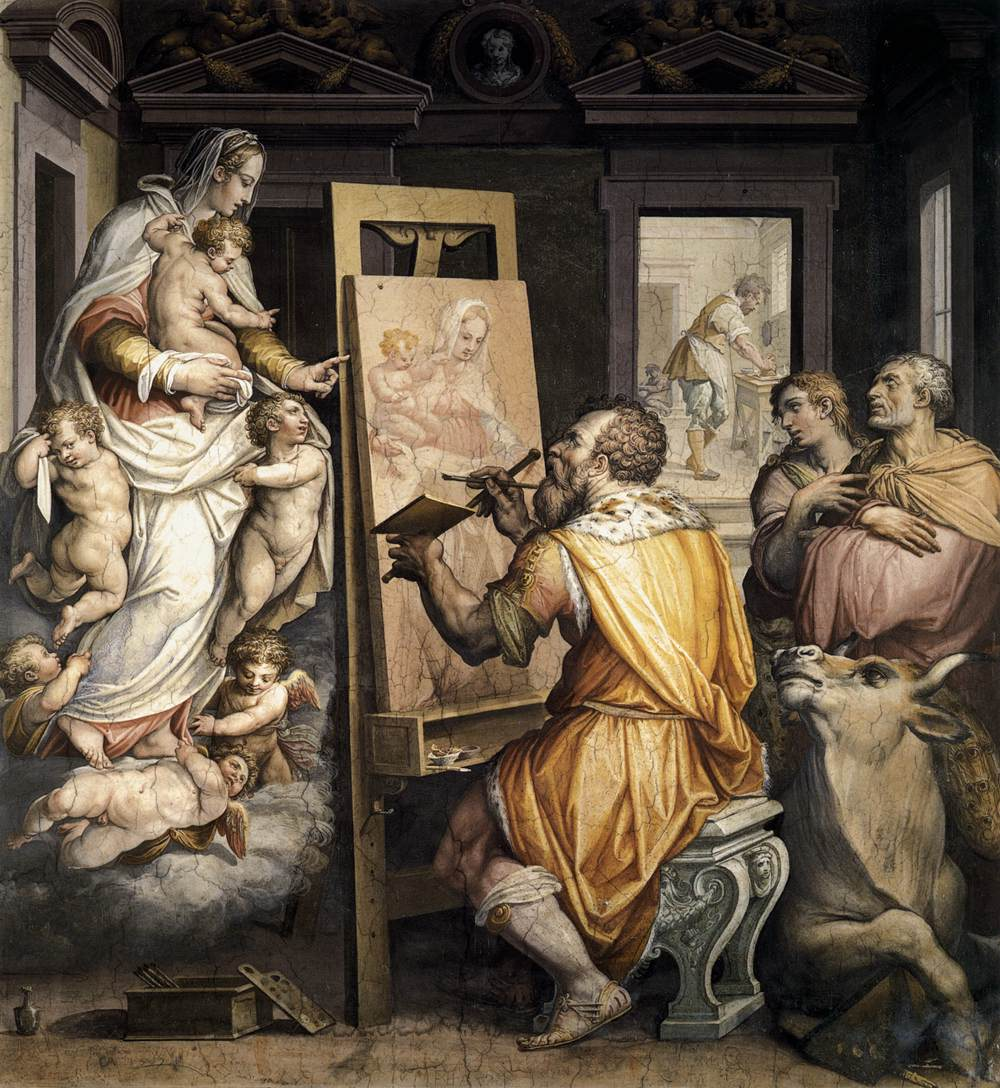
St Luke paints the Virgin, fresco by Vasari.

On the entrance is a wooden crucifix by Antonio da Sangallo the elder (deriving from the former church of San Gallo; an Enthroned Madonna and Saints by Pontormo, also called Sacra conversazione di San Ruffillo and once attributed to Raffaellino del Garbo, derived from the destroyed church of San Ruffillo and moved her in 19th century; a lunette with a St John of Patmos attributed to Giovanni della Robbia, and a reproduction of the Madonna and Child with Angels by Agostino di Duccio. The original of the Duccio is now at the Museo Nazionale del Bargello.

The chapel has ten niches with stucco sculptures of the prophets and saints. The entrance organ (1702) by Tommaso Fabbri of Faenza still functions. The center of the chapel has a plaque, attributed to Montosoli, covering the entrance to the burial crypt. Along the walls are painting including: Construction of the Temple of Solomon by Santi di Tito; on the ceiling, Apparition of Virgin to St Bernard (1685) by Luca Giordano and brought here from the destroyed church of Santa Maria dell Pace.

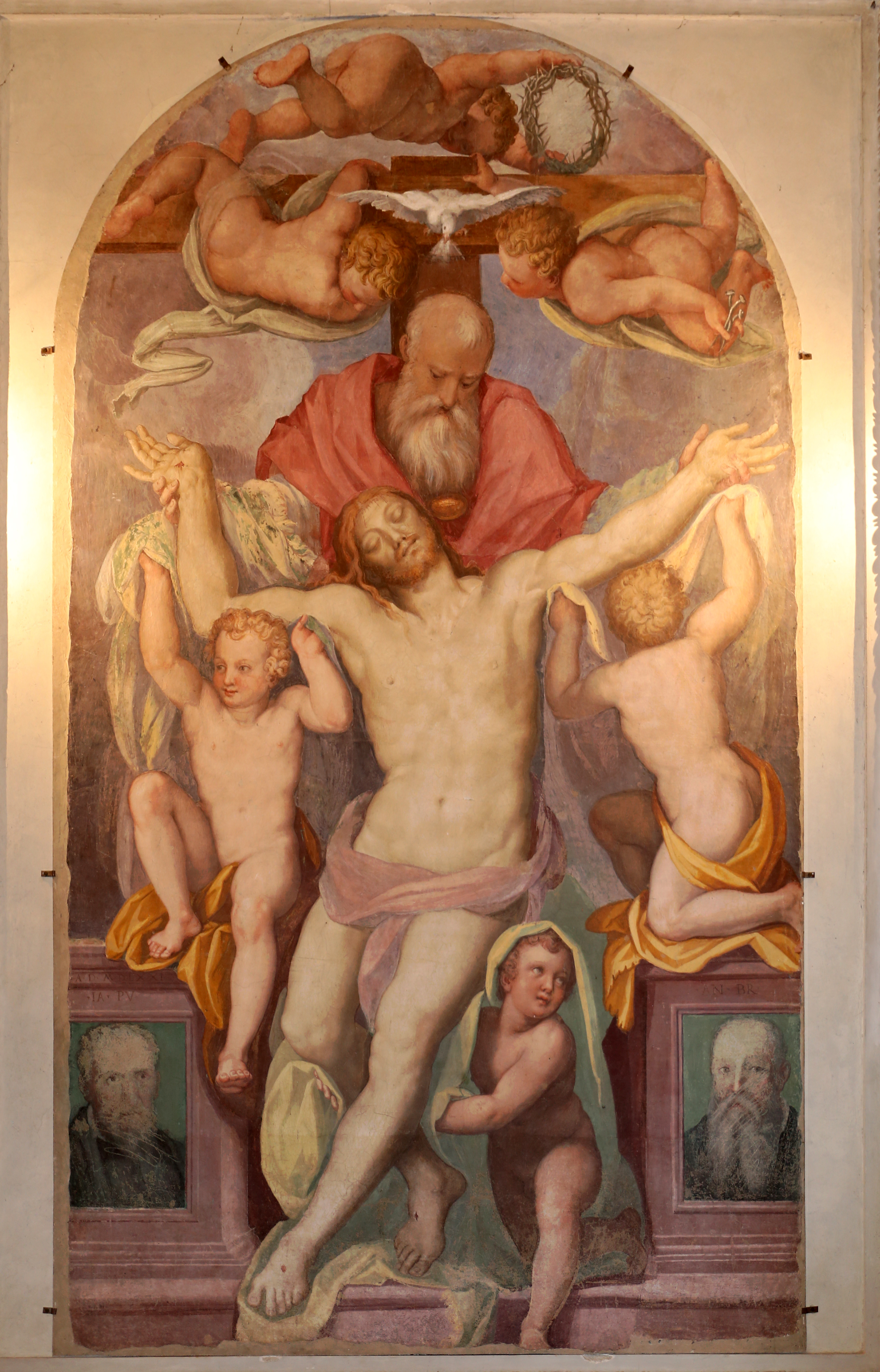
Trinity by Alessandro Allori

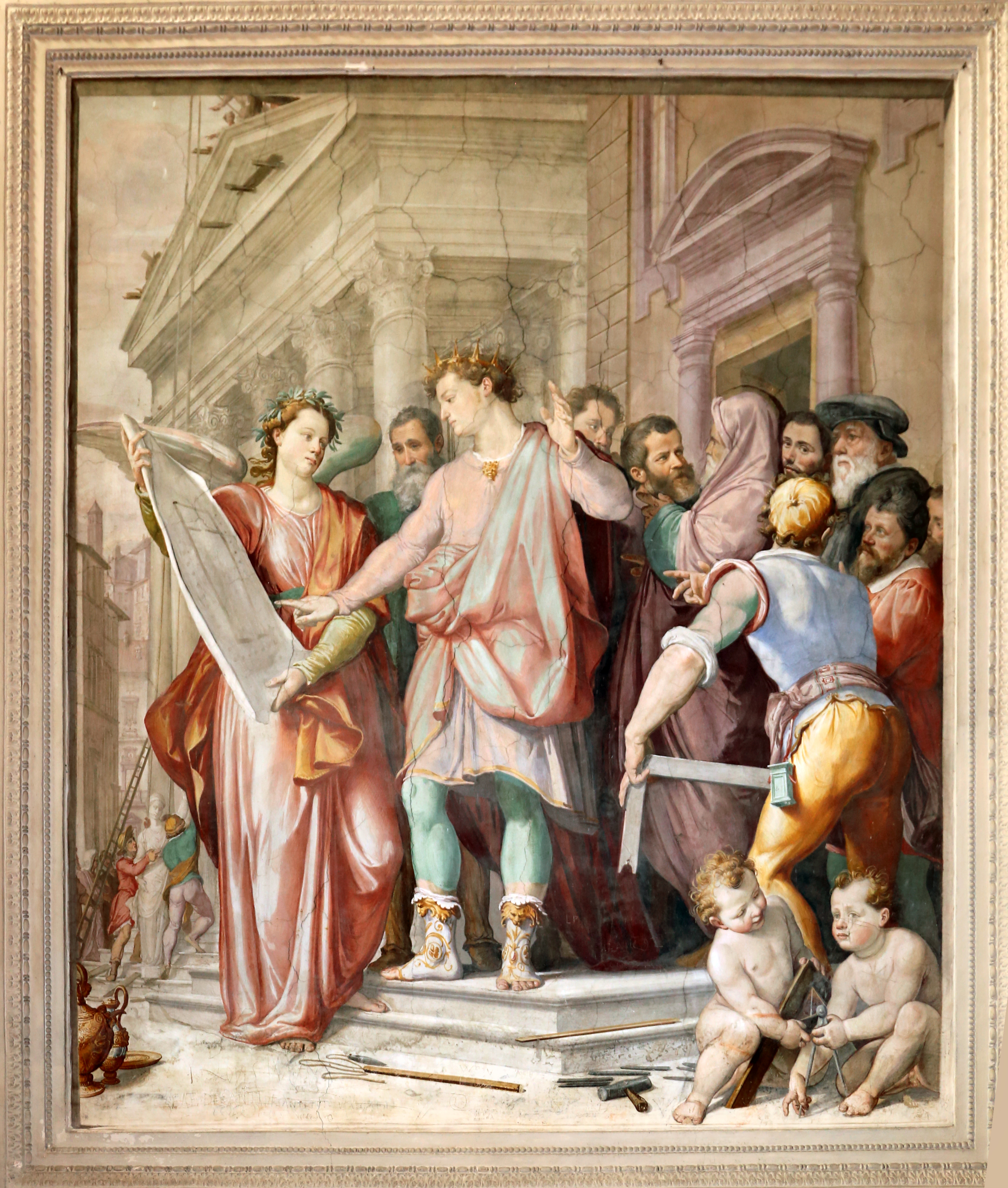
Construction of Temple of Solomon by Santi di Tito

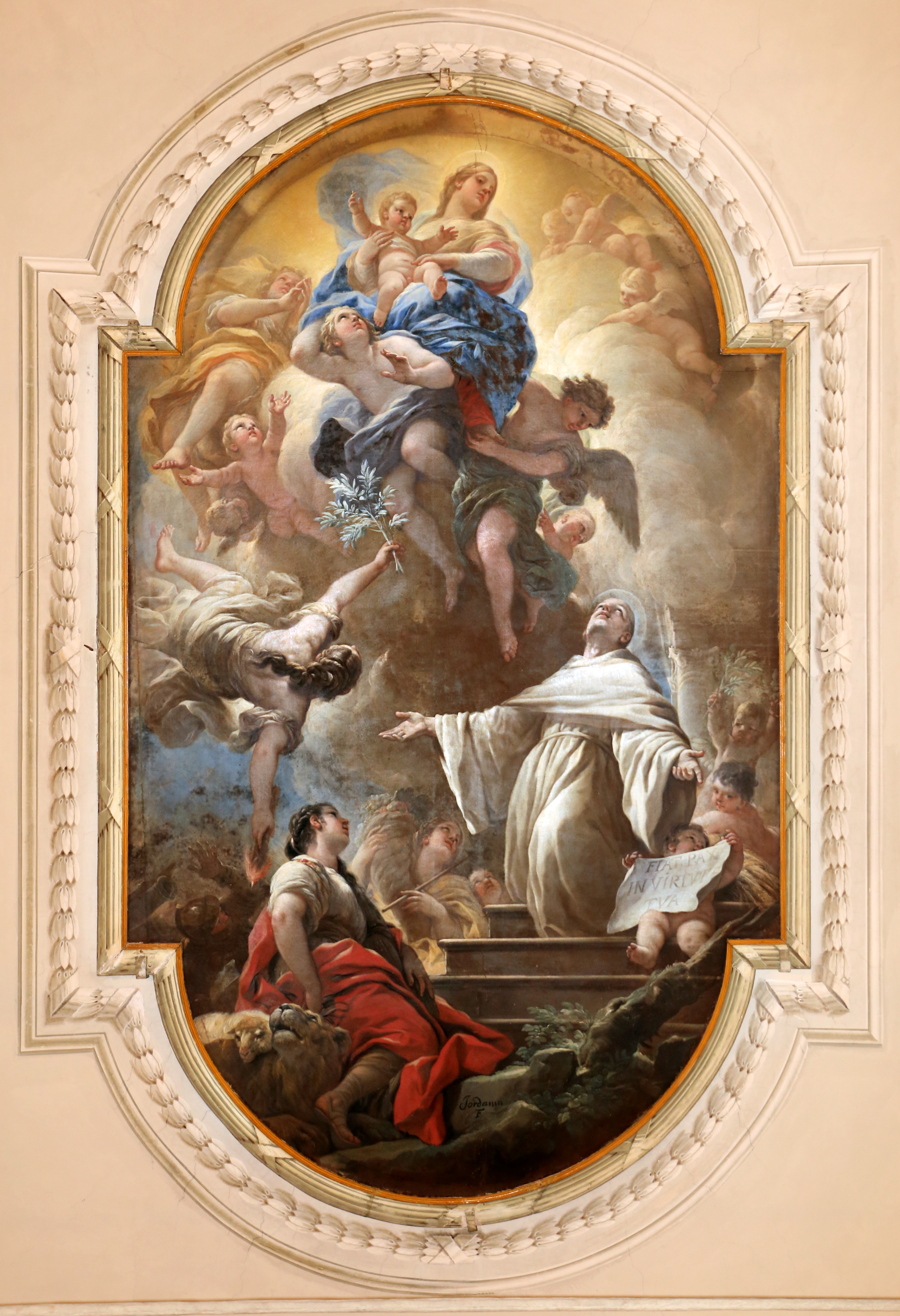
Apparition of the Virgin to St Bernard by Luca Giordano

=== Sculptures ===
Sculptures per La scheda ufficiale di catalogo.

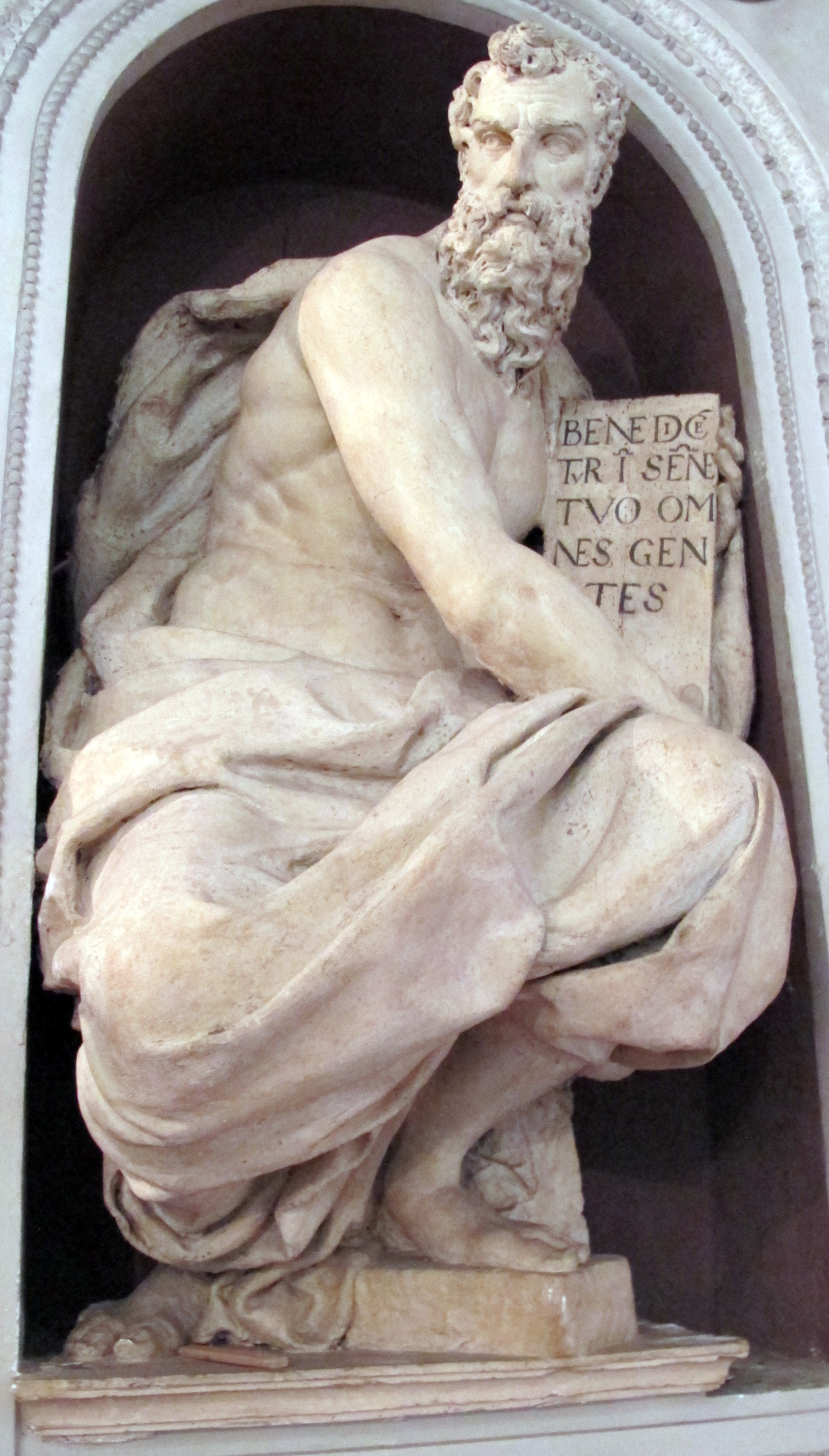
Abraham by Stoldo Lorenzi

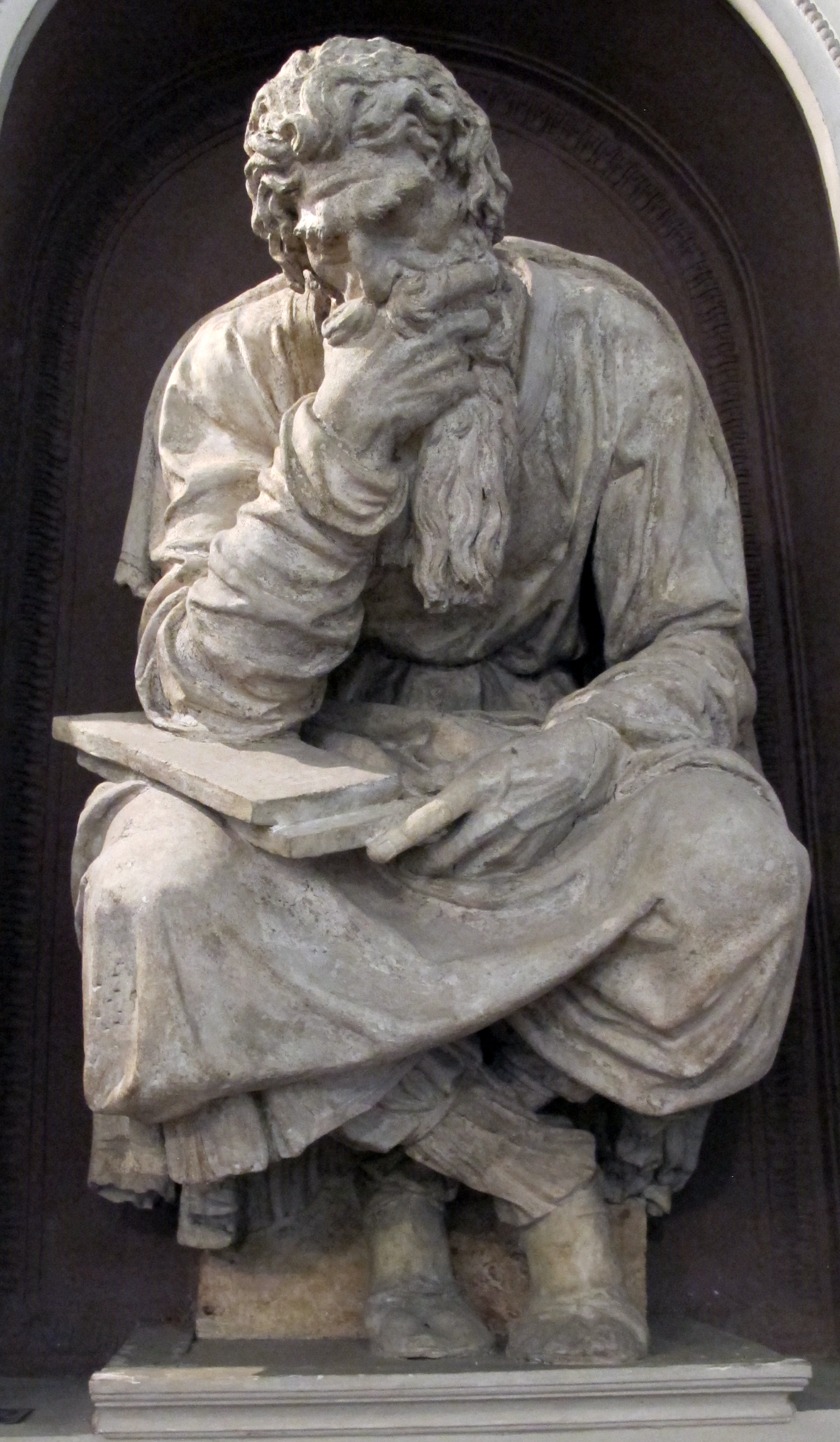
Moses by Montorsoli

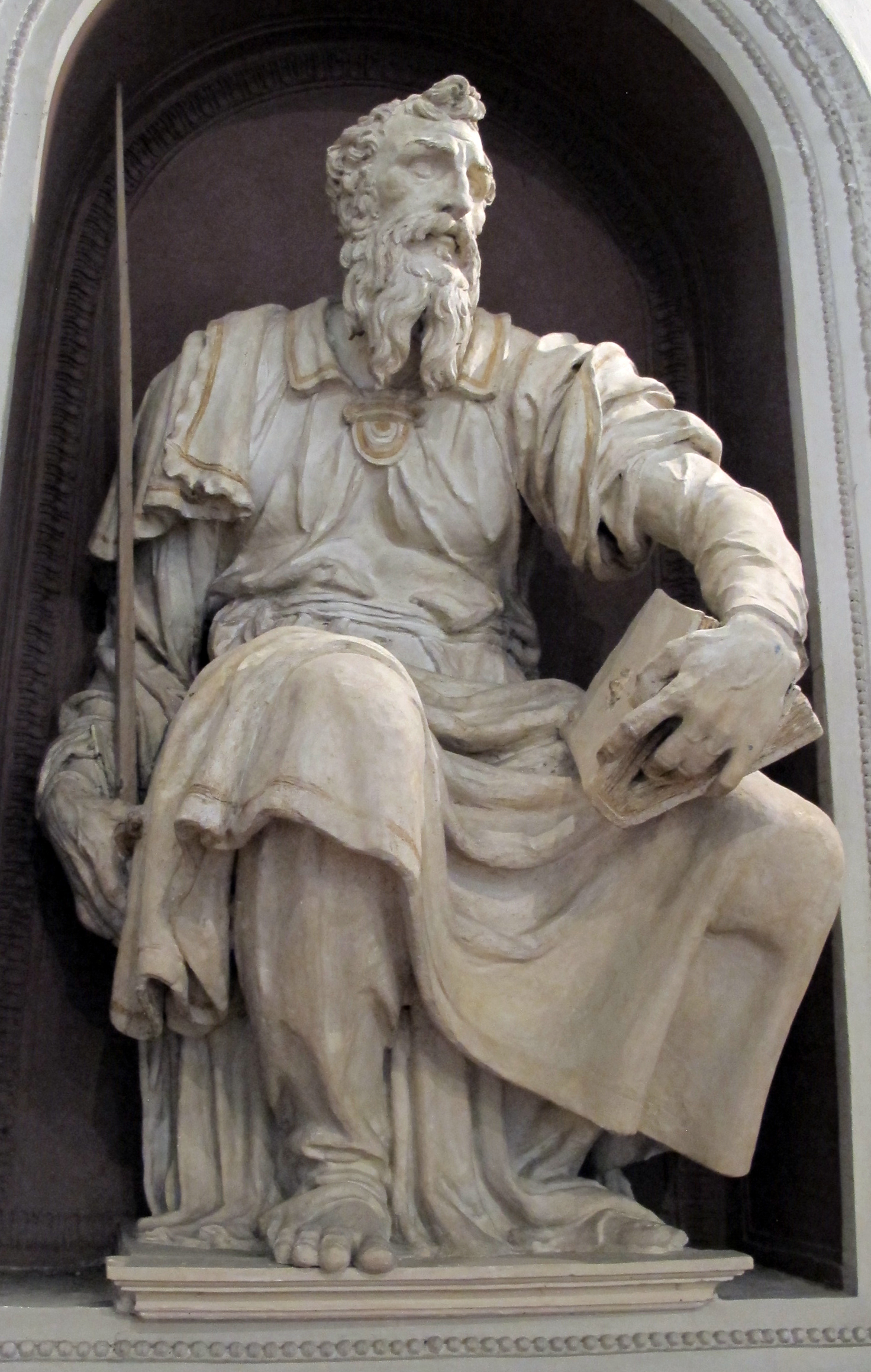
St Paul by Montorsoli

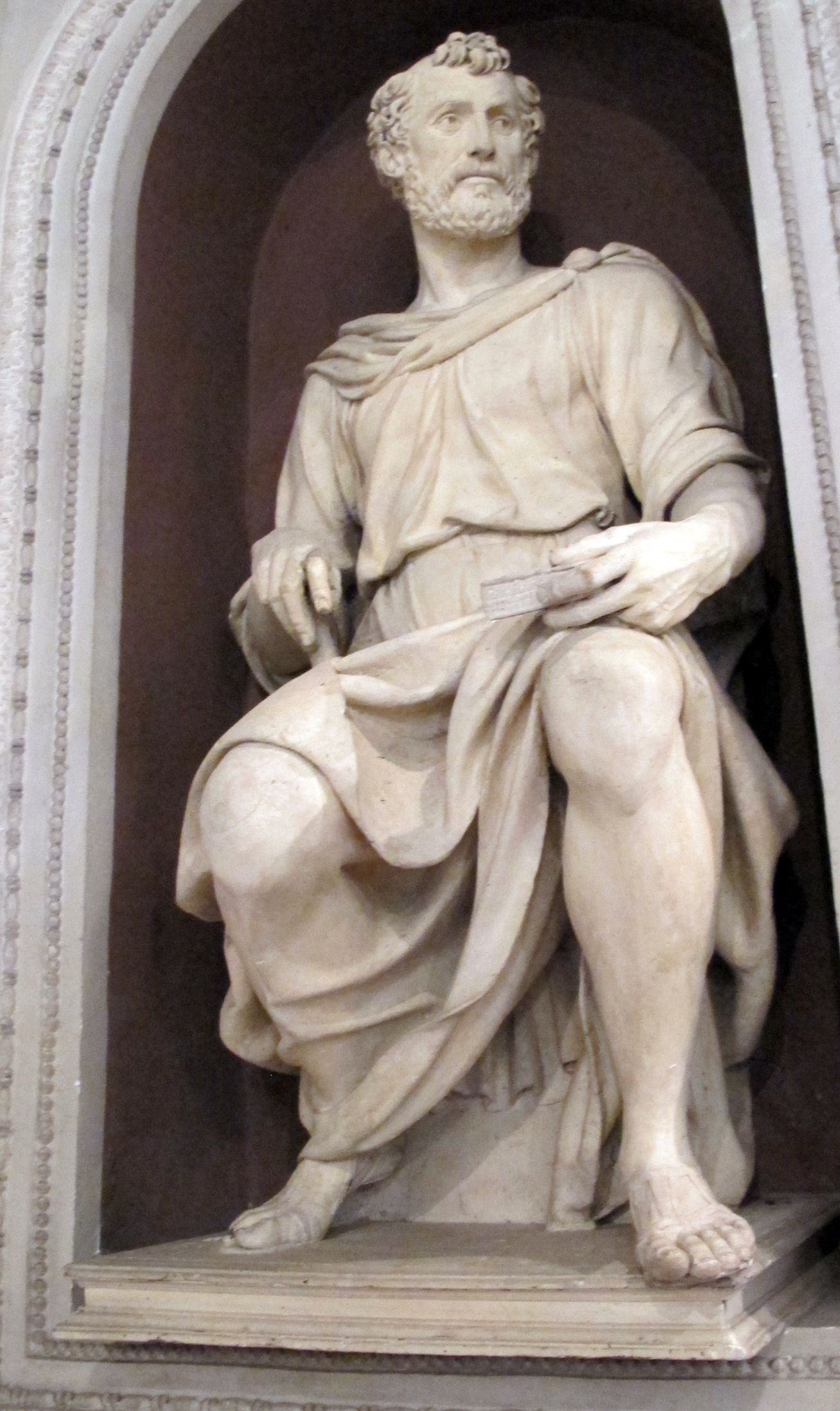
St Peter by Domenico Poggini

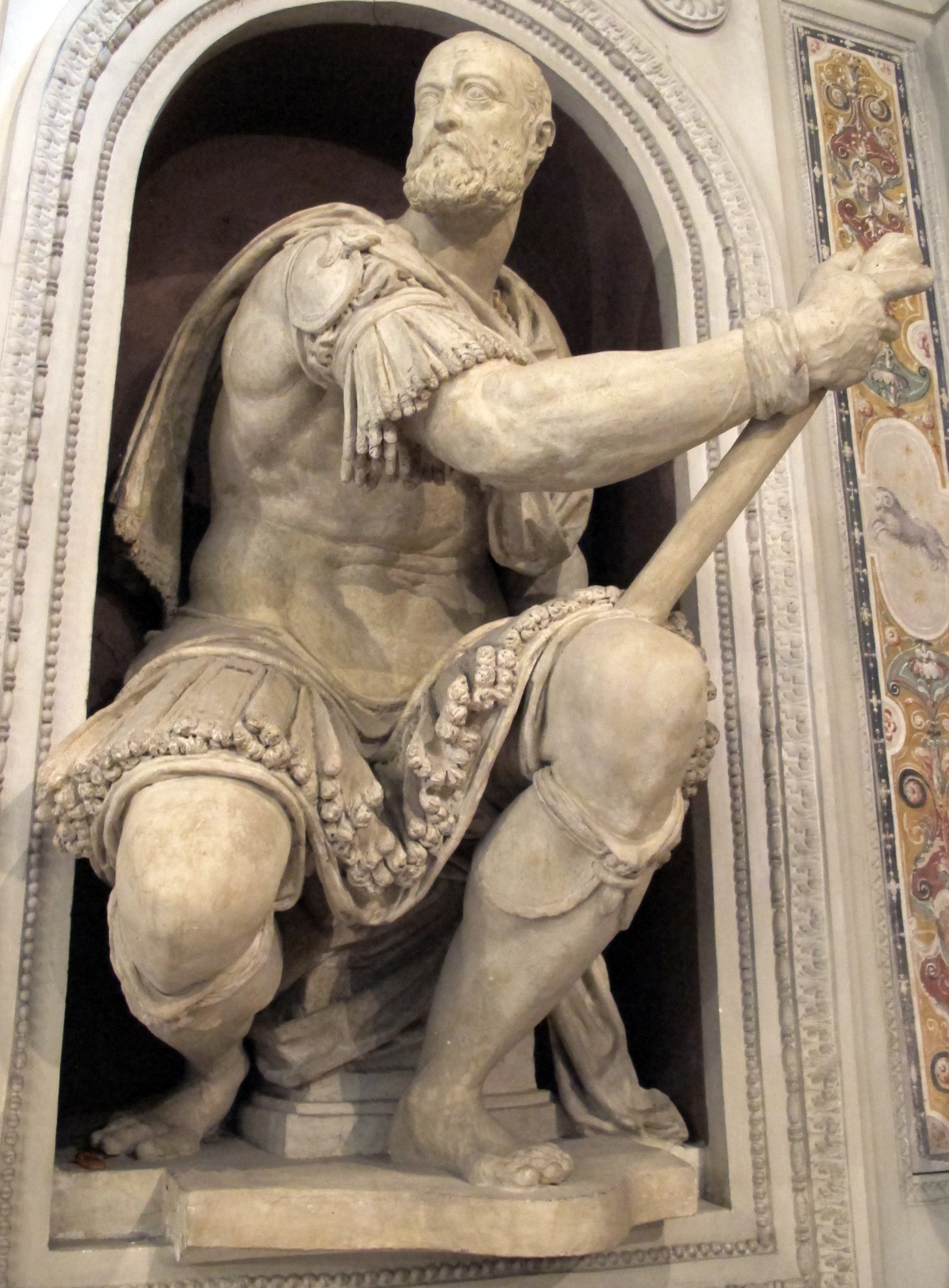
Joseph by Vincenzo Danti and Zanobi Lastricati

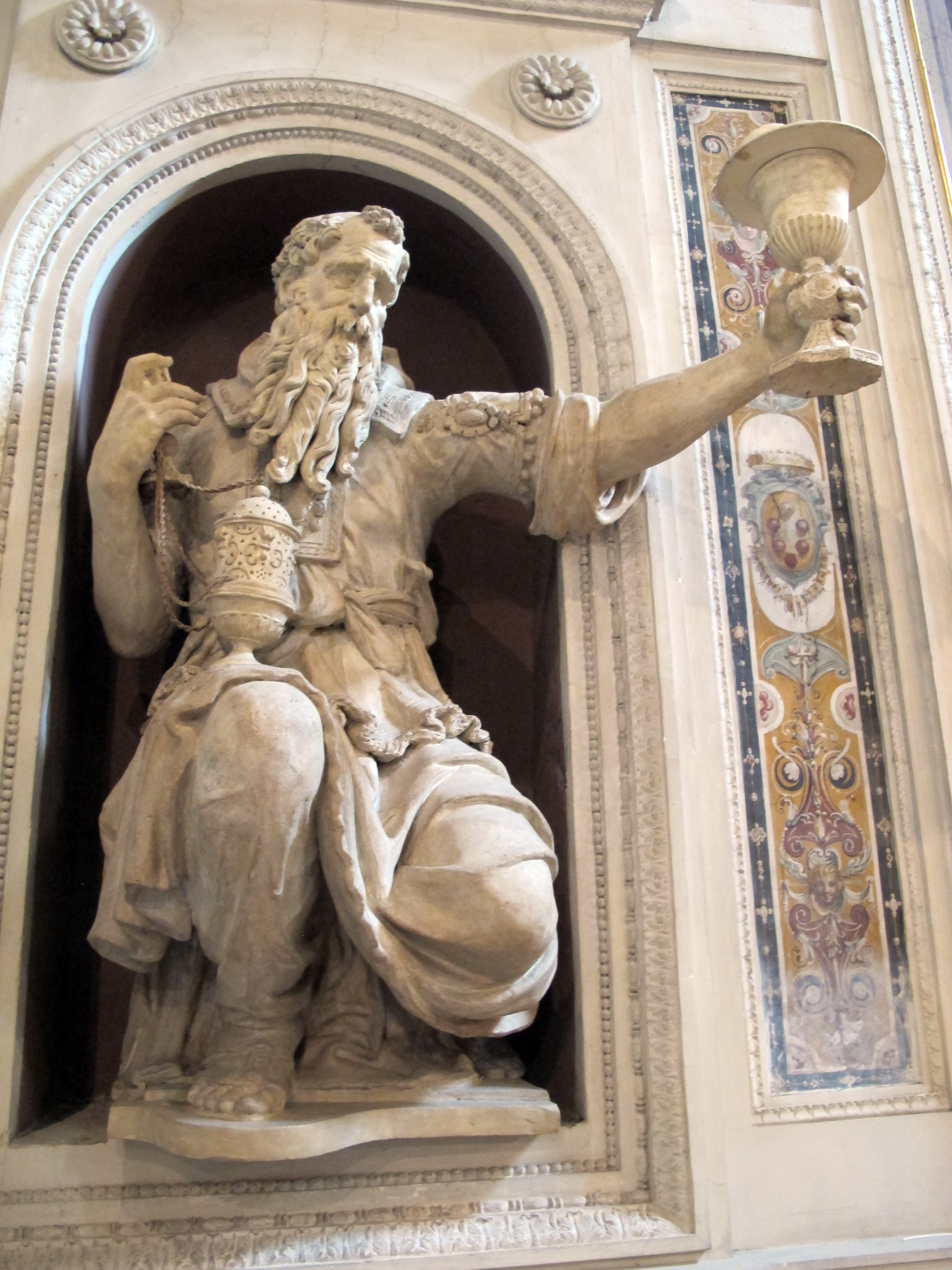
Melchidesech by Francesco Camilliani

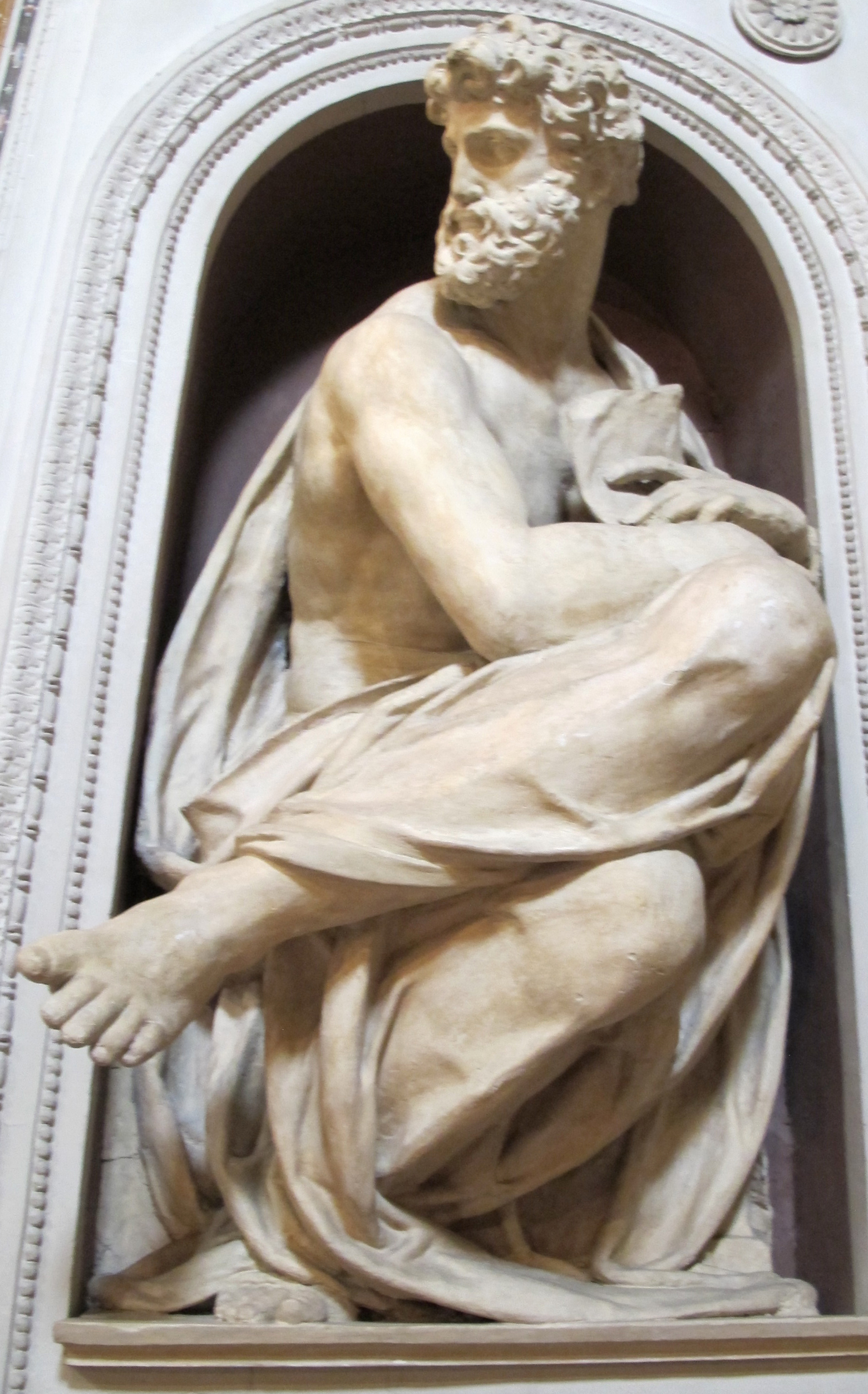
St Luke by Vincenzo Danti

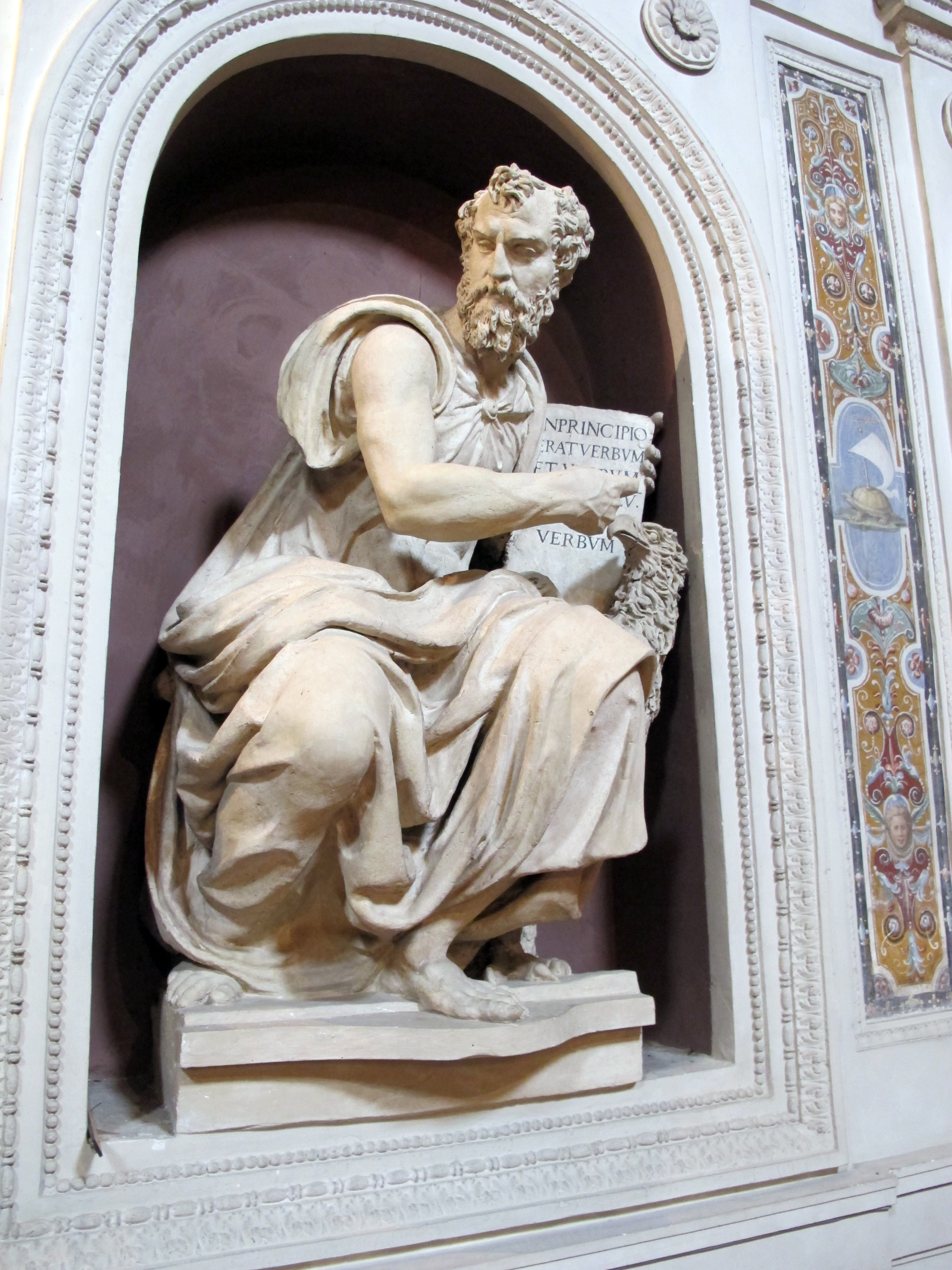
St John Evangelist by Giovanni Vincenzo Casali and Valerio Cioli

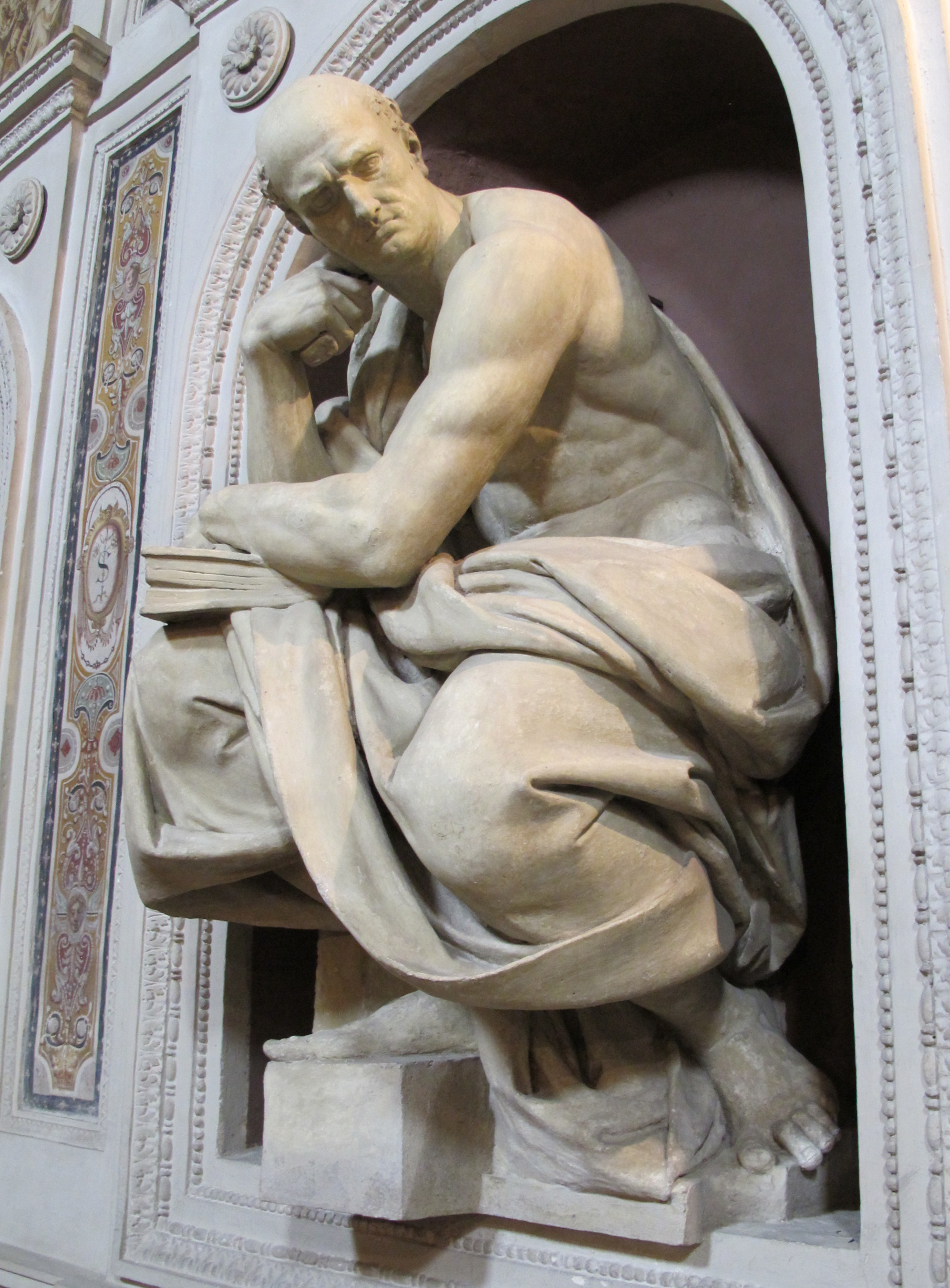
Solomon by Giambologna and Giovanni Vincenzo Casali

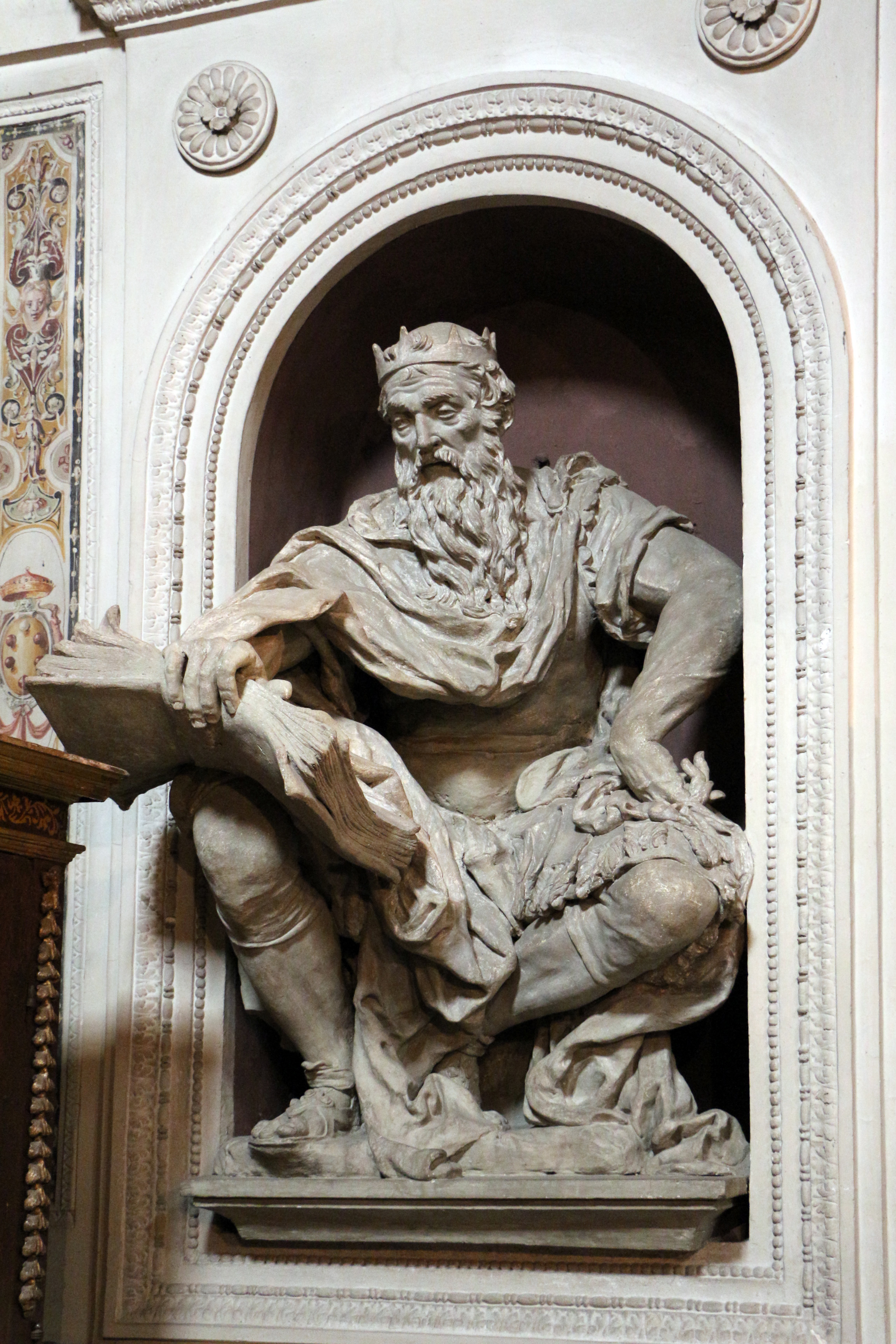
King David attributed to Giovan Battista Foggini

In the lunette at the entrance are two busts in terracotta, depicting the Savior and St Peter attributed to the studio of Pietro Torrigiani. Lost in the 19th century was a St Matthew by Michelangelo Naccherino and a second Solomon by Casali.

== Note ==
- Paraphrased from Italian Wikipedia entry.

== Bibliography ==
- B. W. Meijer, A. Baroni, La "Cappella dei pittori" nel convento della Santissima Annunziata, in Accademia delle Arti del Disegno : Studi, fonti e interpretazioni di 450 anni di storia, a cura di B. W. Meijer e L. Zangheri, Firenze, Olschki, 2015.
- Casalini Eugenio M. La SS. Annunziata di Firenze. Guida storico-artistica, Firenze. Prima edizione Firenze 1957. Seconda edizione, riveduta dall'autore, Firenze 1980. Ristampata nel 2008 con nuove fotografie.
- Pellegrino Tonini, Il santuario della Santissima Annunziata di Firenze. Guida storico illustrativa compilata da un religioso dei Servi di Maria, Firenze, Tipografia di M. Ricci, 1876.
