= Giovanna Tacconi Messini =

Italian artist (1717–1742)

Giovanna Tacconi Messini (1717–1742) was an Italian painter.

A native of Florence, Grand Duchy of Tuscany, Messini was married to the pastellist Ferdinando Messini, sometimes called Messinia. She worked as a copyist and painted in oils and fresco, but was especially known for her talent as a portraitist in pastels. Her work was compared by one contemporary to that of Rembrandt and Jacob Jordaens, and her pastels after Raphael and Titian were highly sought after in her day. After her death her husband erected a memorial in her honor in the church of Santissima Annunziata.
