= Madonna del Sacco (Andrea del Sarto) =

Painting by Andrea del Sarto

Madonna of the Sack
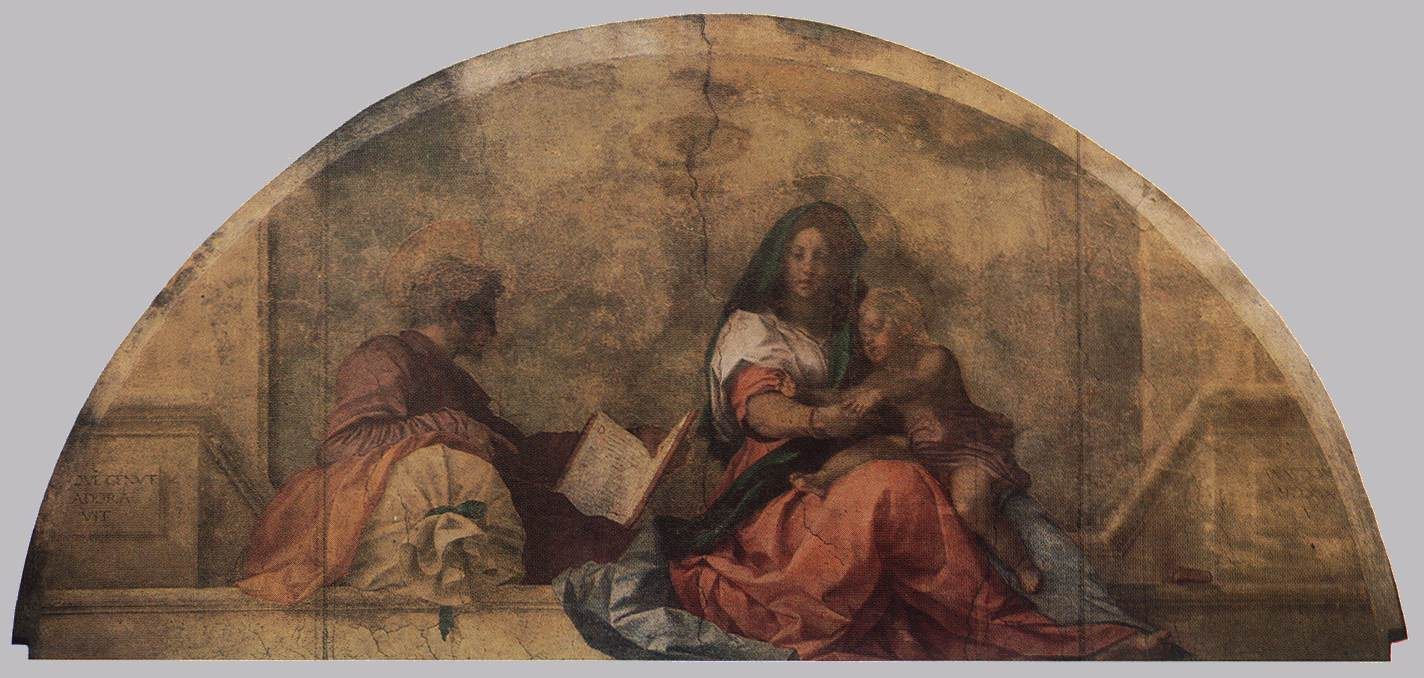
- Artist: Andrea del Sarto
- Year: 1525
- Medium: Fresco
- Dimensions: 191 cm × 403 cm (75 in × 159 in)
- Location: Chiostro Grande, Santissima Annunziata, Florence

The Madonna del Sacco is a fresco painting created in 1525 by the Italian Renaissance artist Andrea del Sarto in the Chiostro Grande (also called Chiostro dei Morti) adjacent to the Basilica of Santissima Annunziata in Florence.

== History ==
Andrea del Sarto (1486–1530) had frescoed seven lunettes during 1514–1516 in the small cloister in front of the church facade, including the well-known Nativity of the Virgin. He returned a decade later to complete this more serene, uncrowded arrangement of the Holy Family.

The painting was depicted in copies and engravings by multiple artists including Raphael Morghen and Michelle Corneille the Elder.

== Description and style ==
The work depicts a forward-facing Madonna, seated on a ledge, with the Christ child moving across her lap. To the right of the triangular composition, St Joseph leans on a white sack, reading from an open book. A small closed book lies to the left of the Madonna. All three have yellow halo discs. The pillar to the left of Joseph reads Que Genuit Adora Vit. On the right pillar is the date 1525.

== Bibliography ==
- (in Italian) Eugenio Casalini, La SS. Annunziata di Firenze, Becocci Editore, Firenze 1980.
