= Giovanni Vincenzo Casali =

Italian sculptor

Giovanni Vincenzo Casali, o Casale (1539 – 21 December 1593) was an Italian sculptor, architect, and Servite friar.

== Biography ==
He was born in Florence, and in 1566 joined the Servite order, associated with the convent of the Annunziata. He trained as a sculptor under fellow cleric Giovanni Angelo Montorsoli. In Florence he helped design the celebration machines for the wedding of Giovanna d'Austria with Francesco I of Medici. He participated in the completion of two sculptures for the Chapel of San Luca in the Annunziata, including that of Solomon (along with Giambologna) and John the Evangelist (along with Valerio Cioli. He moved to Rome to help restore some of the sculptural antiquities housed in the Villa Medici. He then was recruited to Naples by the Duke of Osuna to complete some architectural works, including work for the Servite convent associated with the church of Santa Maria ad Ogni Bene dei Sette Dolori. From there he obtained a commission to work in Portugal as an architect for King Philip II of Spain and rebuild some fortresses. He died in Coimbra, Portugal.
