= Giovanni Angelo Montorsoli =

Italian sculptor

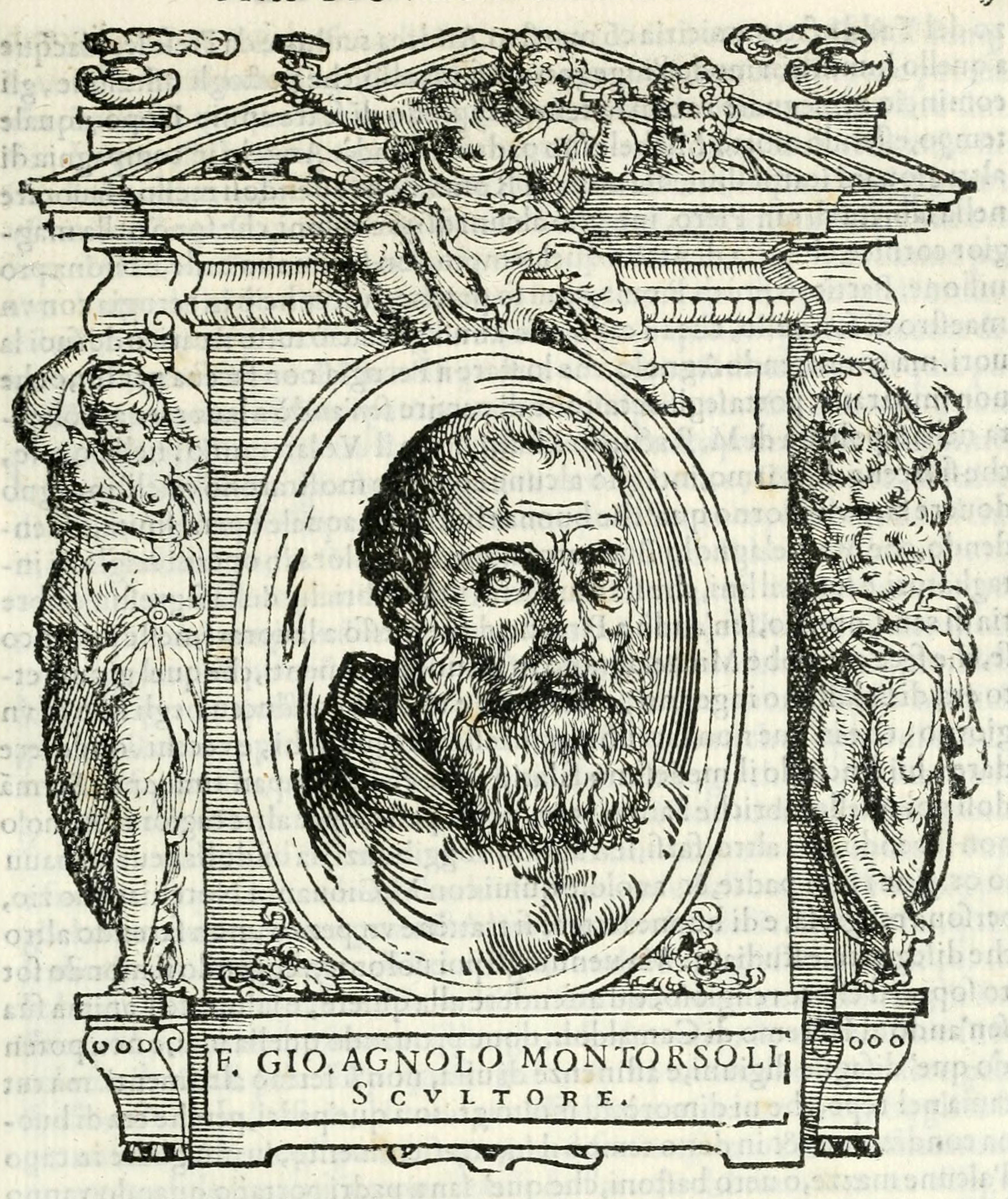
- Portrait of Giovanni Angelo Montorsoli from the 1568 edition of Le vite de' piv eccellenti pittori, scvltori, et architettori by Giorgio Vasari (Florence: Giunti)
- Born: 1507; Montorsoli, Florence
- Died: 31 August 1563; Florence
- Education: pupil of Michelangelo Buonarroti
- Known for: sculpture

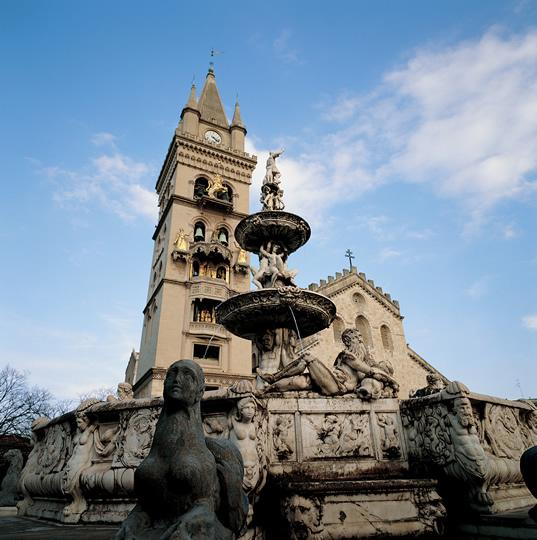
Fountain of Orion in Messina.

Giovanni Angelo Montorsoli (1507 – 31 August 1563), also known as Giovann'Agnolo Montorsoli, was a Florentine sculptor and Servite friar. He is today as often remembered for his restorations of famous classical works as his original creations.

== Early life ==
Giovanni Montorsoli was born in 1507 at Montorsoli, now in the comune of Vaglia, north of Florence, the son of Michele d'Angelo da Poggibonsi. From 1521 to 1534 he was employed as an assistant to Michelangelo Buonarroti at the Medici Chapel (Sacrestia Nuova) and in the Biblioteca Medicea Laurenziana at the Basilica of San Lorenzo in Florence. Montorsoli is known to have sculpted St. Cosmas with another of Michelangelo's assistants, Raffaello da Montelupo, after a model by the master. He became a friar of the Servite Order, but continued to work as a sculptor.

== Work ==
In 1532-1533 he produced his Drunken Satyr. This sculpture was probably intended for a wall fountain, possibly situated in a niche where the water would have flown from the open neck of the satyr's wineskin. This would have been in a style very popular at the time in Rome. Due to the large number of ancient sculptures in Rome, these tended to be utilised rather than commissioning a new figure. However, in Florence ancient statuary was much less common. Montorsoli's Satyr, with its classical theme and distinctly classical style, was intended to fill the void.

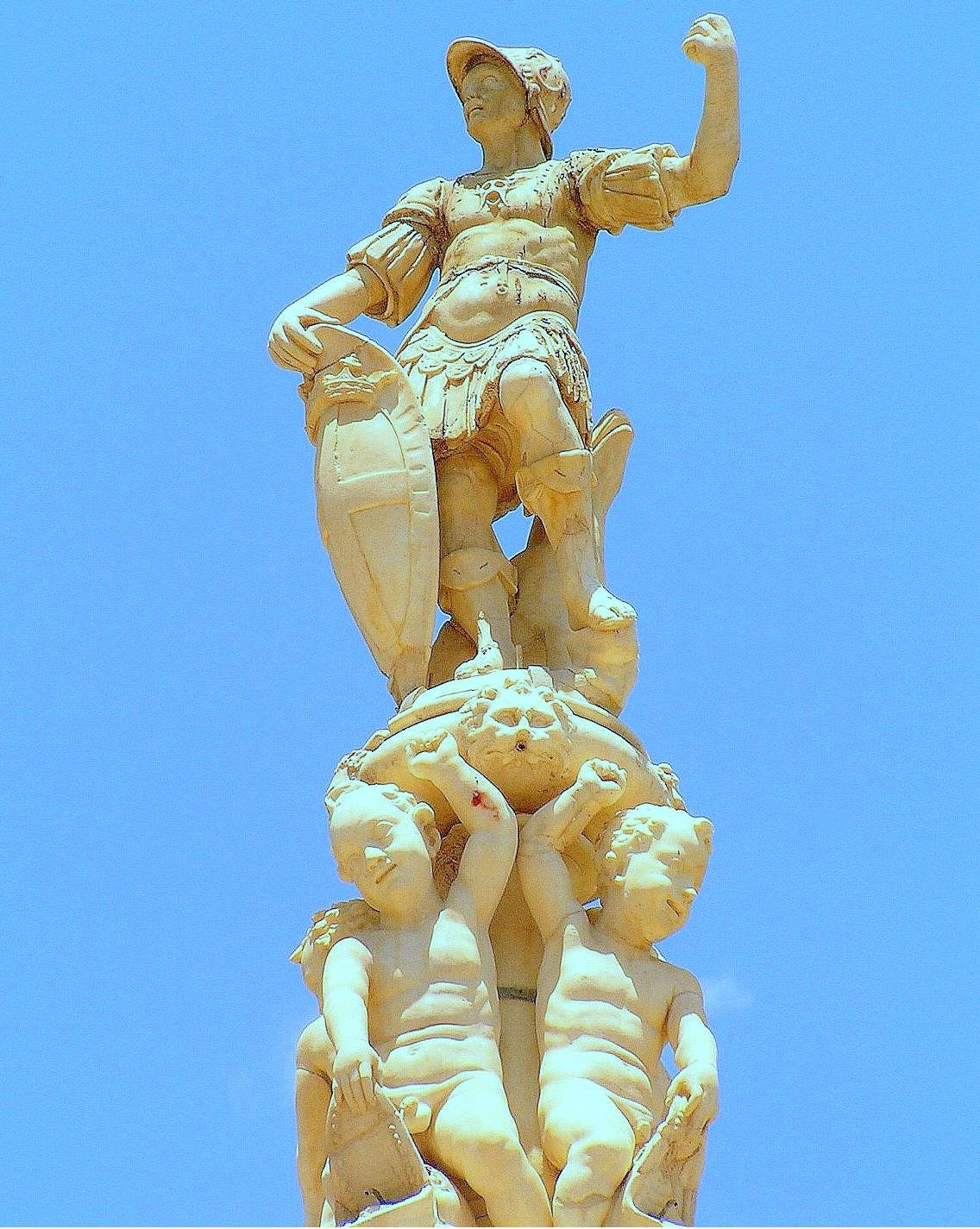
The Orion Fountain (detail)

In 1532 he was summoned by Pope Clement VII to the Belvedere courtyard to restore many of the antique sculptures there. This included the Laocoön and His Sons group and the Belvedere Apollo. Restoration methods in that era entailed reworking sculptures in accordance with contemporary principles which often were at odds with the aesthetics of antiquity. For instance, Montorsoli included a new right arm in the central figure of the Laocoön group, upraised in a gesture of defiance, adding much to the fame of the sculpture and himself. However, when the original limb was found in 1905 in Rome and reattached to the Laocoön sculpture, replacing Montorsoli's work, the original was revealed to be folded at the elbow with considerably less flourish.

In 1547 he left Florence, and went to Messina where he procured a commission for the Fountain of Orion, the mythical founder of that city. When erected, the Orion Fountain was the tallest and largest of its day and was much admired by Vasari. It is a candelabrum type, like the fountains at the Medici villa at Castello by Tribolo, but it has evolved. The receiving basin is polygonal, contrasting with the circular basins above. The sculpted creatures supporting the second basin are carved in deep relief, but the female nudes above them appear to be carved in the round. They have become sculptures in their own right, and are not just there to decorate the shaft, or to draw the eye upwards to the figure at the summit. This is the candelabrum type at its pinnacle. On polygonal basin's rim are the statues of four river gods (Tiber, Nile, Camaro and Ebro) with Latin inscriptions by the scientist-humanist Francesco Maurolico who, probably, was also the creator of most of the Neoplatonic-alchemical program for the fountain. On the perimeter are eight oval reliefs, all with subjects taken from Ovid's Metamorphoses. In 1553 this fountain was finished, and he was commissioned for another fountain - the Fountain of Neptune.

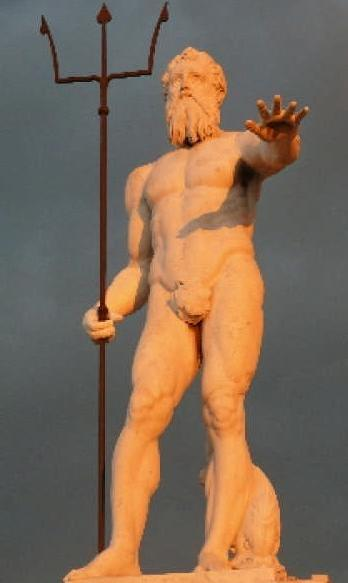
Neptune

This was a complete break with tradition with regards to fountain design. Previously fountains had mainly been either a basin with a small figure, such as Donatello's winged infant and Rustici's Mercury of 1515, or a wall fountain, or a candelabrum type. The Fountain of Neptune (whose original is now in the Interdisciplinary Regional Museum of Messina) is completely different. It is a fountain type with one main raised central figure, and this type had never been done before. The only precedent for it was a design by Benvenuto Cellini for the French King at Fontainebleau. In the middle of the fountain Cellini wanted to erect a "pedestal, projecting somewhat above the margin of the basin, and upon this a nude male figure" which was to represent the King himself as Mars. This never came into being though, and therefore the Neptune at Messina is the first of its type.

The Fountain of Neptune makes good use of contrasts. The God of the Sea is arranged in a classical, static pose. Yet below him the figures of the sea monsters Scylla and Charybdis writhe around and draw back in terror. Scylla and Charybdis were the names of rocks near the harbour of Messina; as they had wrecked so many ships, they came to be personified by sea monsters. Neptune's act of warding off these destructive forces demonstrates his power and his protection of the city. This work was especially influential in Florence, which had an affection of colossal statuary, and it likely influenced designs for Ammanati's Neptune Fountain in the Piazza della Signoria. Florentine fountains excelled in designing fountains with many small thin elegant jets of water, even when there was enough water to have a large geyser. Montorsoli carried this Florentine tradition of having smaller, elegant jets, and judging from a design of his in the Uffizi he used eight of them for his design for the Neptune fountain. The Fountain of Neptune was finished in 1557. In Messina he also realized the church of San Lorenzo (from 1552; destroyed in the earthquake of 1783), the Lantern Tower (1555) and the Apostolate within the Cathedral (completed in 1555, was destroyed several times by fires and earthquakes, and then was rebuilt).

Montorsoli left some of his works in Genoa in the church of San Matteo, commissioned by Andrea Doria, for his tomb and some sculptures. Among his pupils were Giovanni Angelo Lottini and Giovanni Vincenzo Casali.

== The Accademia delle Arti del Disegno ==
Montorsoli was instrumental in the foundation in 1562–1563 of the Accademia delle Arti del Disegno, which was the academy of art and of artists in Florence until 1784, and which at first met in the Servite church of the Santissima Annunziata where Montorsoli had worked on the decorations of the Cappella dei Pittori, in which the order had given permission for artists to be buried. The Accademia was formed under the patronage of Cosimo I de' Medici, Grand Duke of Tuscany, and with the support of Giorgio Vasari. The first meeting was held on 13 January 1563. Montorsoli died on 31 August of the same year.

== See also ==
- Michelangelo
- Medici Chapel (Michelangelo)
