= Santissima Annunziata, Florence =

Catholic minor basilica in Florence, Italy

Coordinates: 43.777361°N 11.260965°E

Basilica della Santissima Annunziata
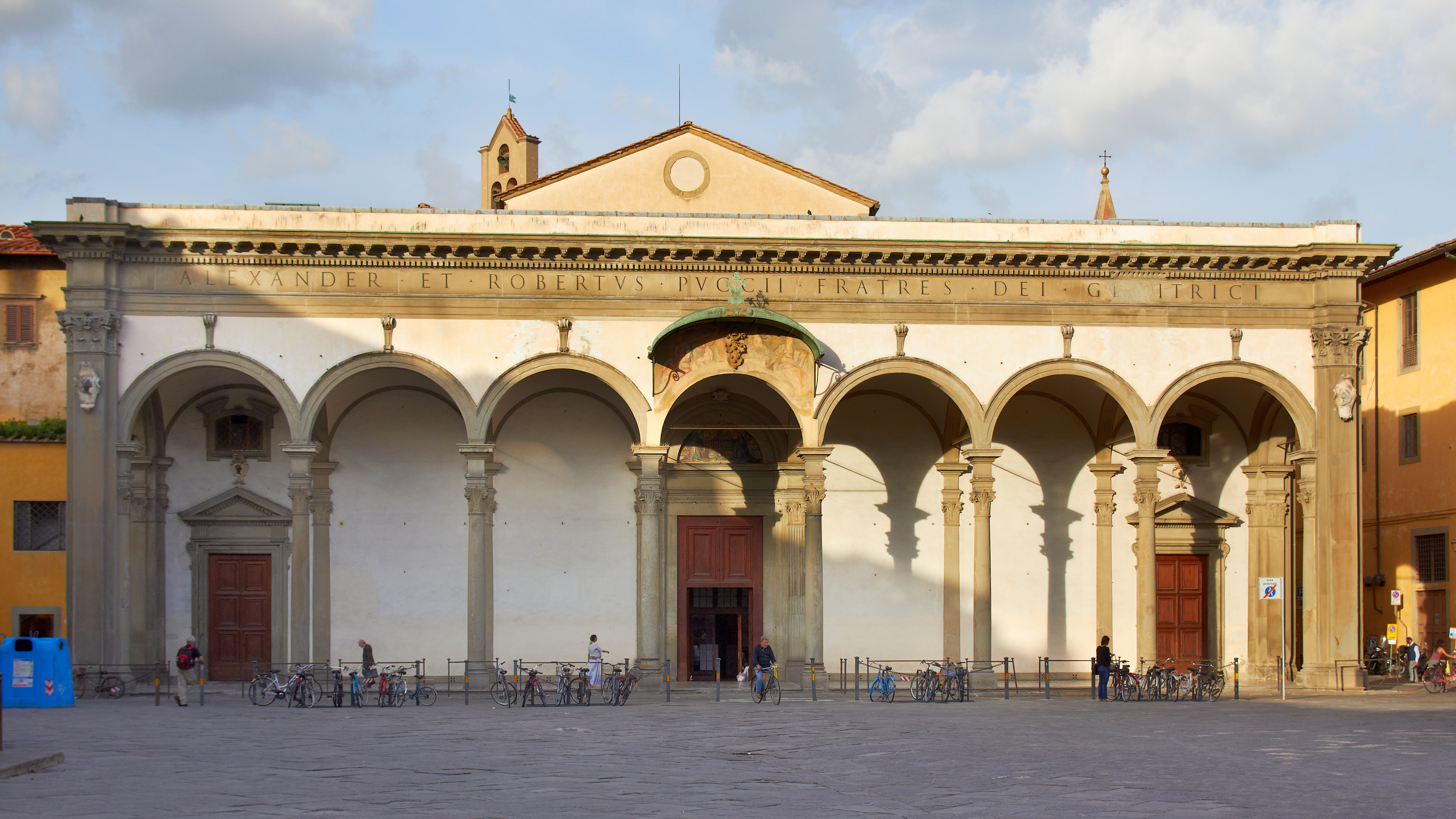

The Basilica della Santissima Annunziata (Basilica of the Most Holy Annunciation) is a Renaissance-style, Catholic minor basilica in Florence, region of Tuscany, Italy. This is considered the mother church of the Servite Order. It is located at the northeastern side of the Piazza Santissima Annunziata near the city center.

== History ==
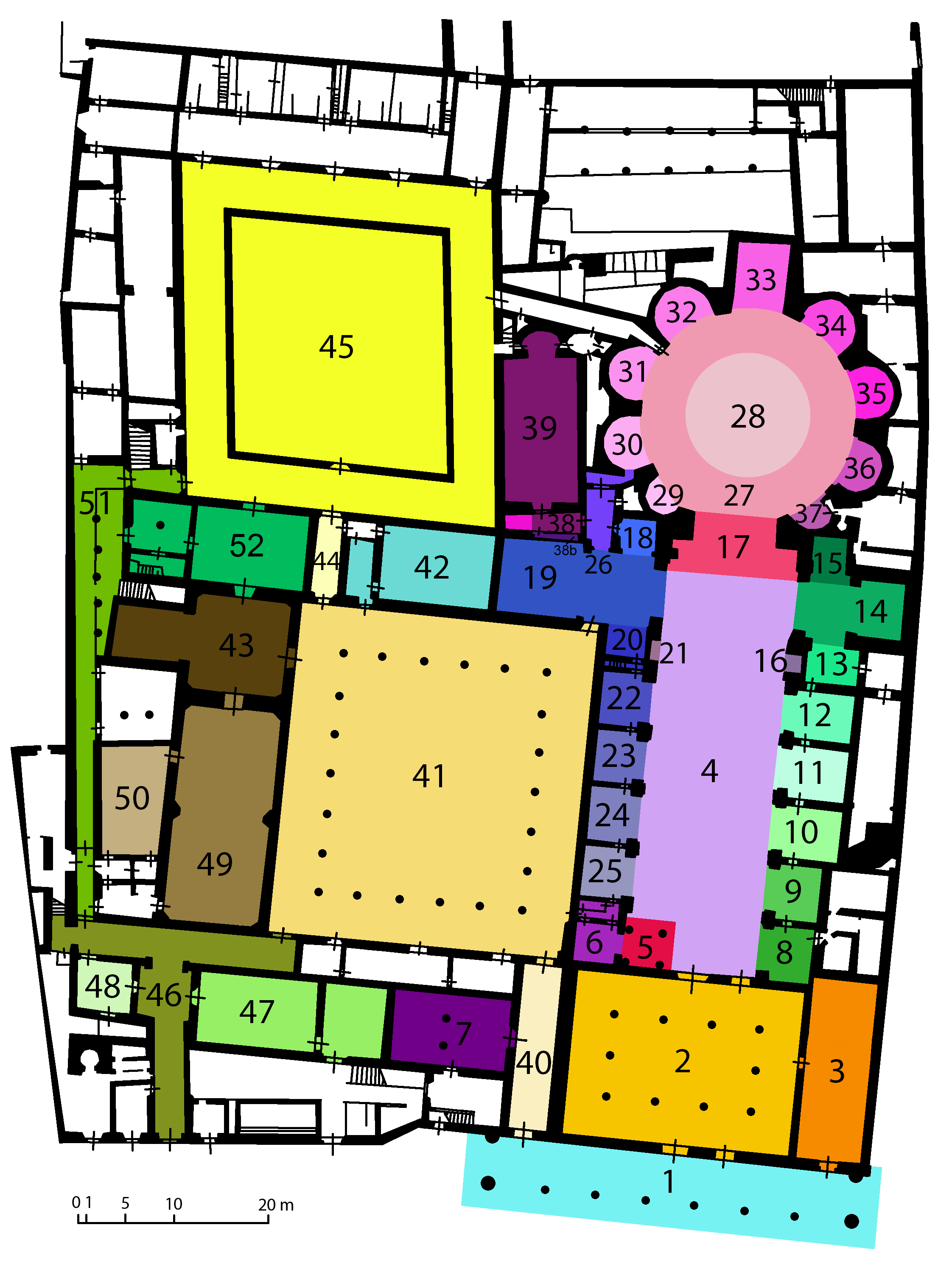
Map of the church and the convent

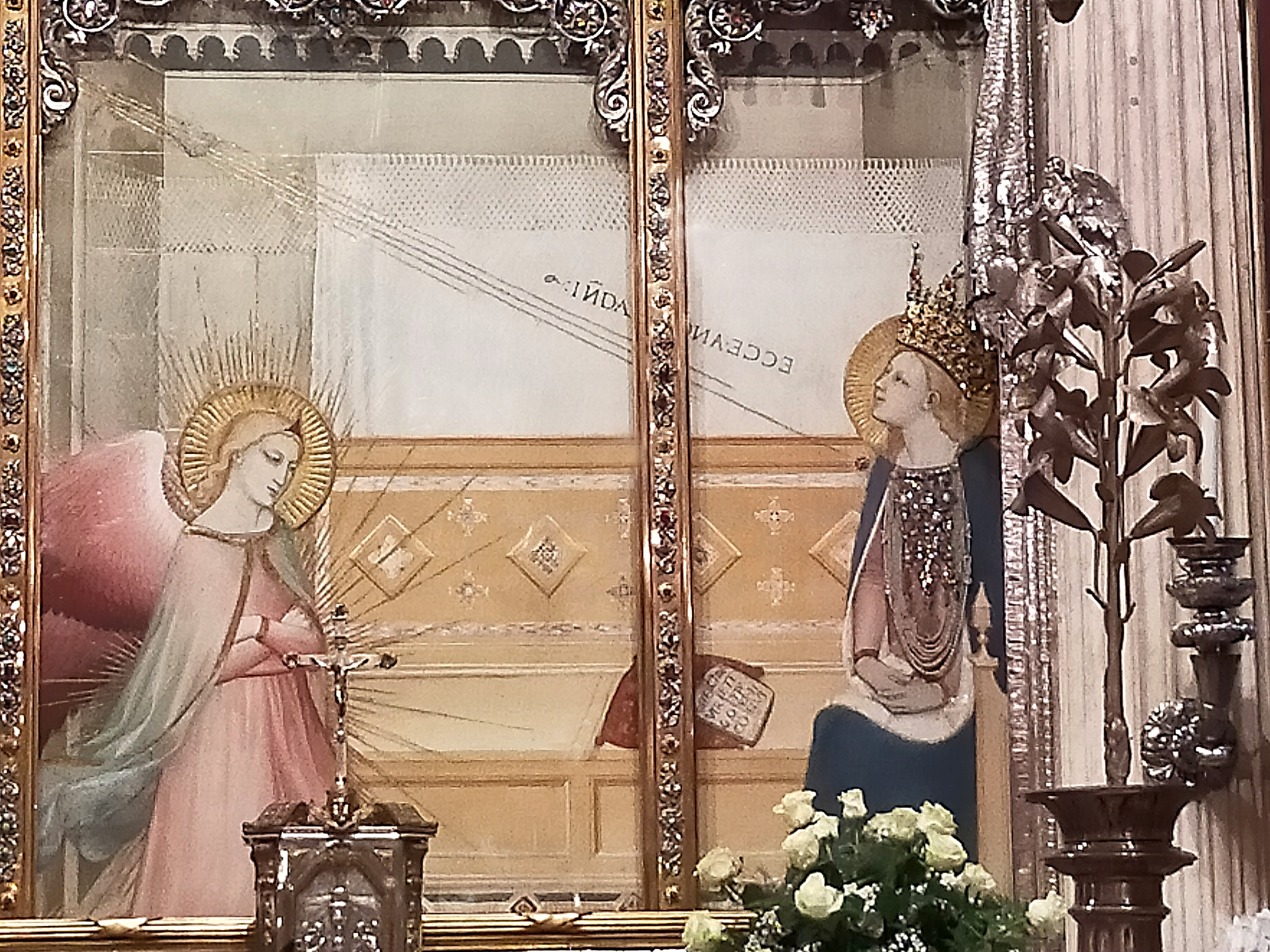
The fresco of the Annunciation after cleaning, 2020.

The church was founded in 1250 by the seven original members of the Servite Order. In 1252, a painting of the Annunciation had been begun by a friar Bartolomeo, commissioned by the Servite monks. It is said he despaired about being able to paint a virgin with a beautiful enough face, and fell asleep, only to find the painting completed. This miracle he attributed to an angel. The painting now housed in the church, acquired increasing veneration, such that in 1444 the Gonzaga family from Mantua financed a special tribune. Initially Michelozzo, who was the brother of the Servite prior, was commissioned to build it, but since Ludovico III Gonzaga had a special admiration for Leon Battista Alberti, this latter architect was given the commission in 1469. Alberti's designs were constricted by the pre-existing foundations. Construction was completed in 1481, after Alberti's death. Though the structure was refurbished in Baroque-style in the seventeenth century, the basic scheme of a domed circular space flanked by altar niches is still evident.

The façade of the church was added in 1601 by the architect Giovanni Battista Caccini, imitating the Renaissance-style of Brunelleschi's façade of the Foundling Hospital, which defines the eastern side of the piazza. The building across from the Foundling Hospital, designed by Sangallo the Elder, was also given a Brunelleschian façade in the 1520s.

== Veneration ==
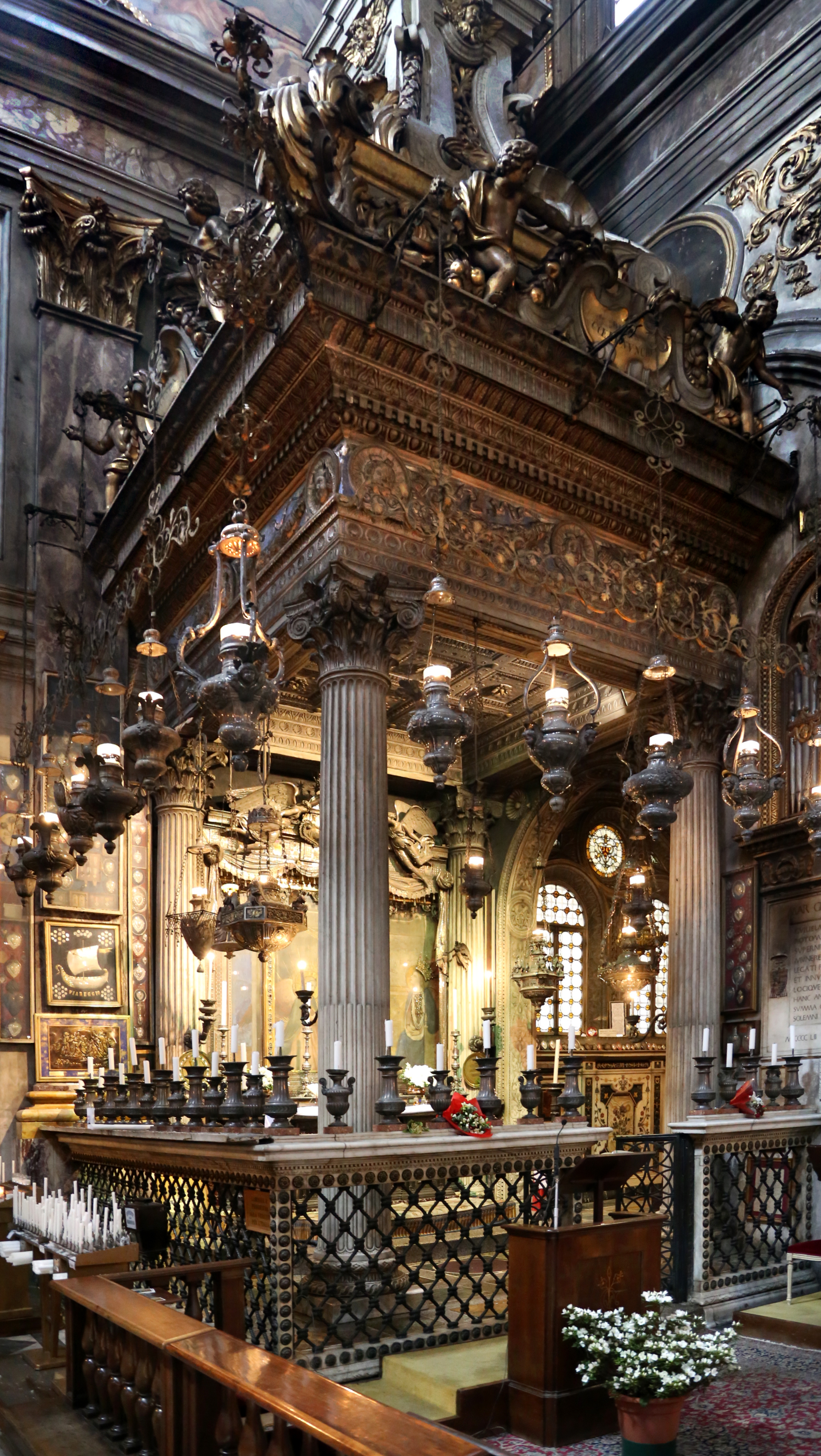
Annunziata Temple

Pilgrims who came to the church to venerate the miraculous painting often left wax votive offerings, many of them life-size models of the donor (sometimes complete with horses). In 1516, a special atrium was built to house these figures, the Chiostrino dei Voti. By the late 18th century there were some six hundred of these images and they had become one of the city's great tourist attractions. In 1786, however, they were all melted down to make candles.

Pope Alexander VI, in appreciation for the survival of Rome after French occupation, paid homage and gifted a silver effigy to the church.

The Florentine brides traditionally visit the shrine to leave their bouquets.

== Interior ==
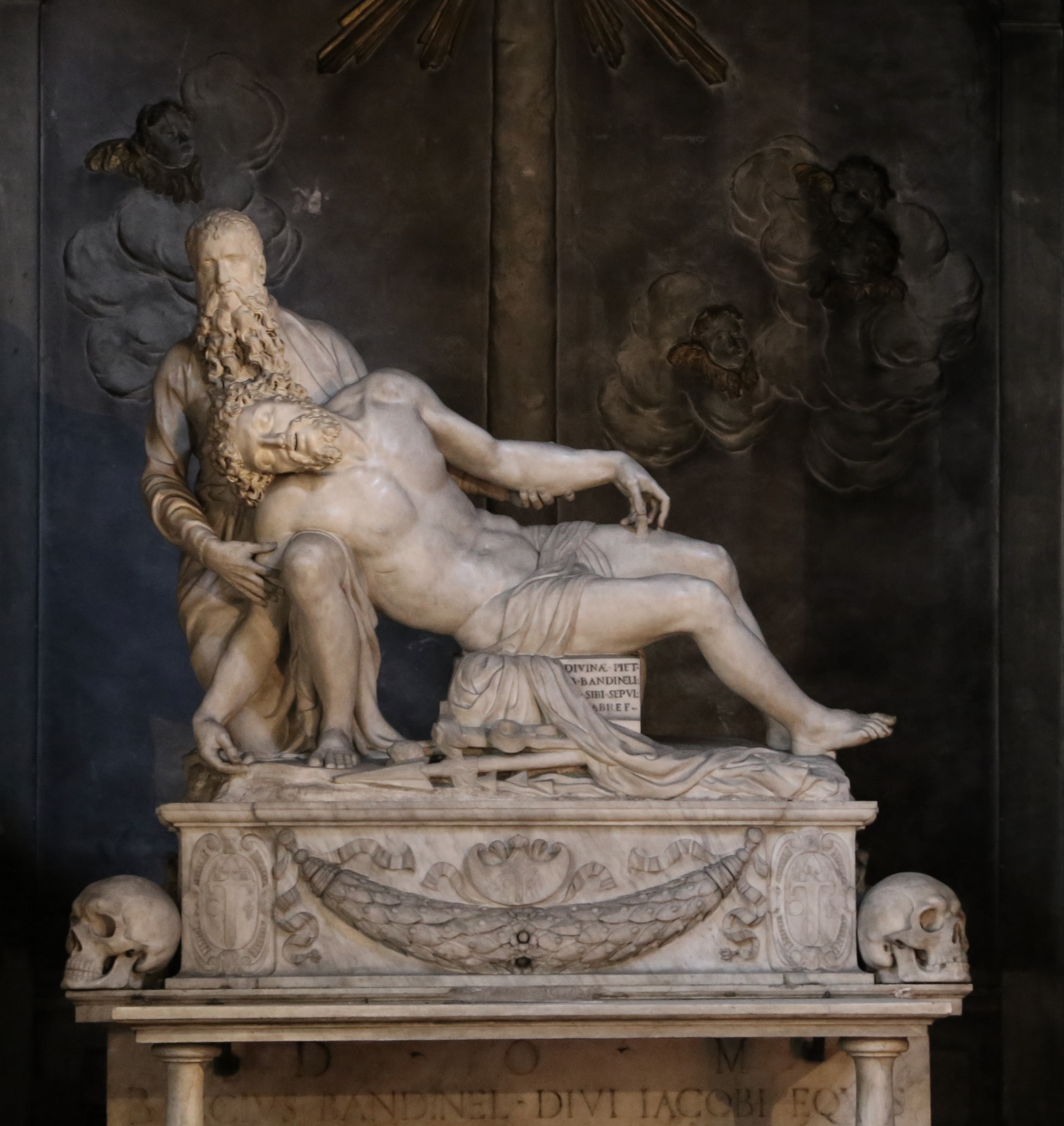
Pietà by Baccio Bandinelli

This church is entered from the Chiostrino dei Voti. The Baroque decoration of the church interior was begun in 1644, when Pietro Giambelli frescoed the ceiling with an Assumption as a centerpiece based on designs by Baldassare Franceschini.

The 1st chapel to right contains a Madonna in Glory by Jacopo da Empoli, with walls frescoed by Matteo Rosselli. The 5th chapel on the right contains a Monument to Orlando de' Medici (1456) by Bernardo Rossellino. The right transept has a small side chapel with a Pietà (1559) by Baccio Bandinelli that adorns the sculptor's own tomb.

The tribune or choir surrounded by chapels, known as the Rotonda, was designed by Michelozzo and Alberti between 1444 and 1476. Notable among the chapels is the fifth (aligned to the axis of the nave), which houses a crucifix (1594–8) by Giambologna, with statues of the "Active and Contemplative Lives" by his pupil Francavilla, saints and angels by Pietro Tacca, and murals by Bernardino Poccetti. The following chapel has a Resurrection (1548–52) by Bronzino with a statue of St Roch attributed to Veit Stoss. The next chapel has a Madonna with Saints by a follower of Perugino.

In the sixth chapel to the left of the nave is a SS Ignatius, Erasmus and Blaise by Raffaellino del Garbo; the next chapel has one of the panels of Annunziata Altarpiece (1507) by Perugino, once at the high altar of the church (the Deposition, begun by Filippino Lippi, is now at the Gallerie dell'Accademia, while other panels are divided between other collections in the world). The altarpiece of the next chapel has a Trinity with Saint Jerome and two saints (c. 1455) by Andrea del Castagno, who also painted the mural of The Vision of St. Julian in the next chapel, called the Feroni chapel. This chapel was elaborately decorated in a baroque fashion by Gianbattista Foggini in 1692. The first chapel just to the left of the entrance has a tabernacle of the Annunciation (1448–52) by Michelozzo and the sculptor Pagno di Lapo Portigiani.

The organ built by Domenico Di Lorenzo da Lucca in 1509–1521 is the oldest in Florence and the third oldest in Italy. Today the titular organist of the church is Simone Stella. The church contains the tomb of the Italian writer Maria Valtorta. A memorial was erected in the church to the painter Giovanna Tacconi Messini by her husband after her death.

== Cloisters ==
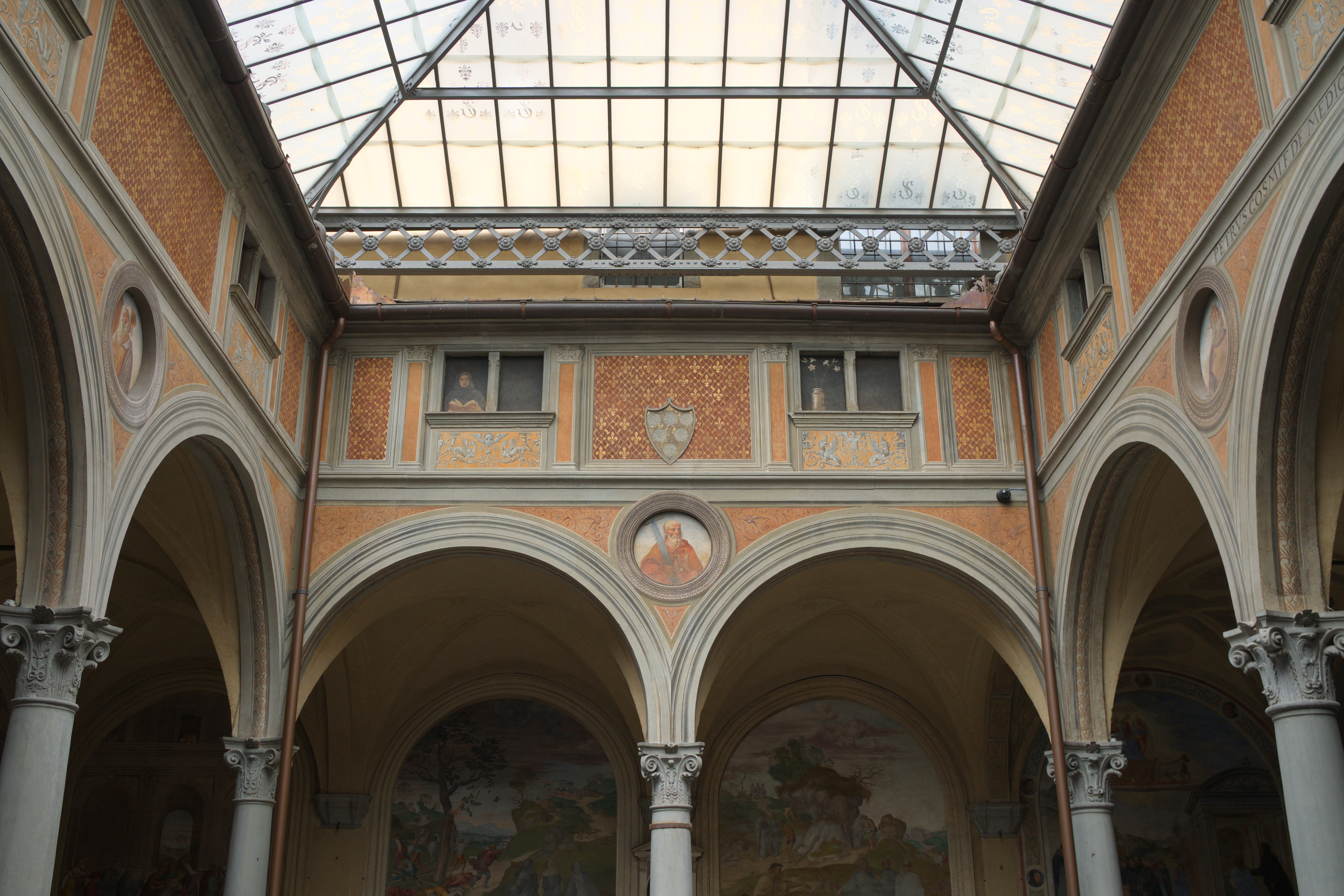
Chiostrino dei Voti, fresco decoration by Andrea Feltrino, 1510–14

The Chiostrino dei Voti was designed by Michelozzo. The center of this small cloister in front of the basilica is sheltered by a 19th-century glass roof. Baldovinetti painted the first lunette in the chiostro in c. 1460. In about 1476, Rosselli began its decoration with a lunette dedicated to the then blessed Filippo Benizzi, fifth Prior General of the Servites. Further lunettes were added by Andrea del Sarto (1509–1515) and Pontormo (1516).

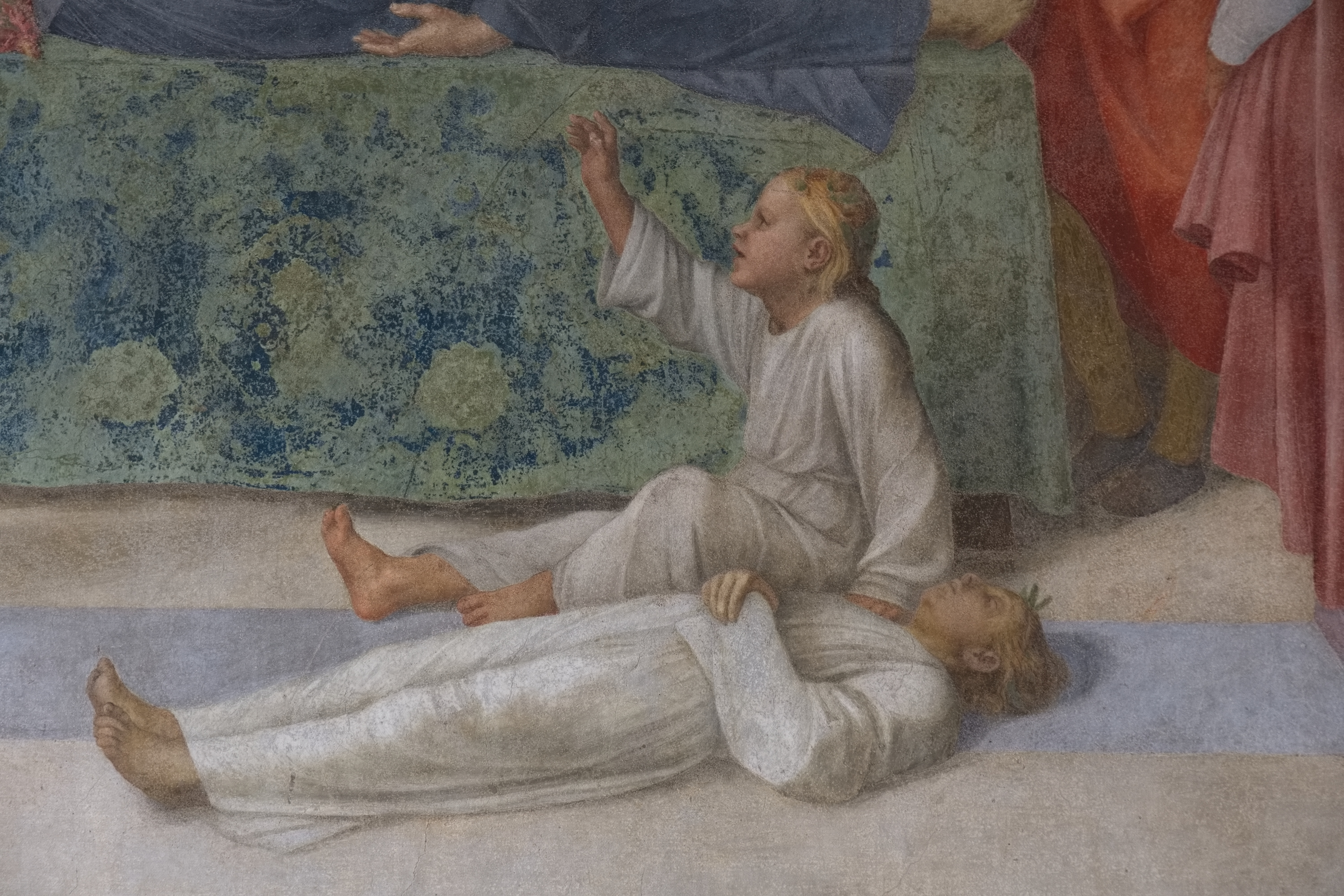
Andrea del Sarto, S Filippo Benizi's Death and Child restored to Life (detail), 1509–10

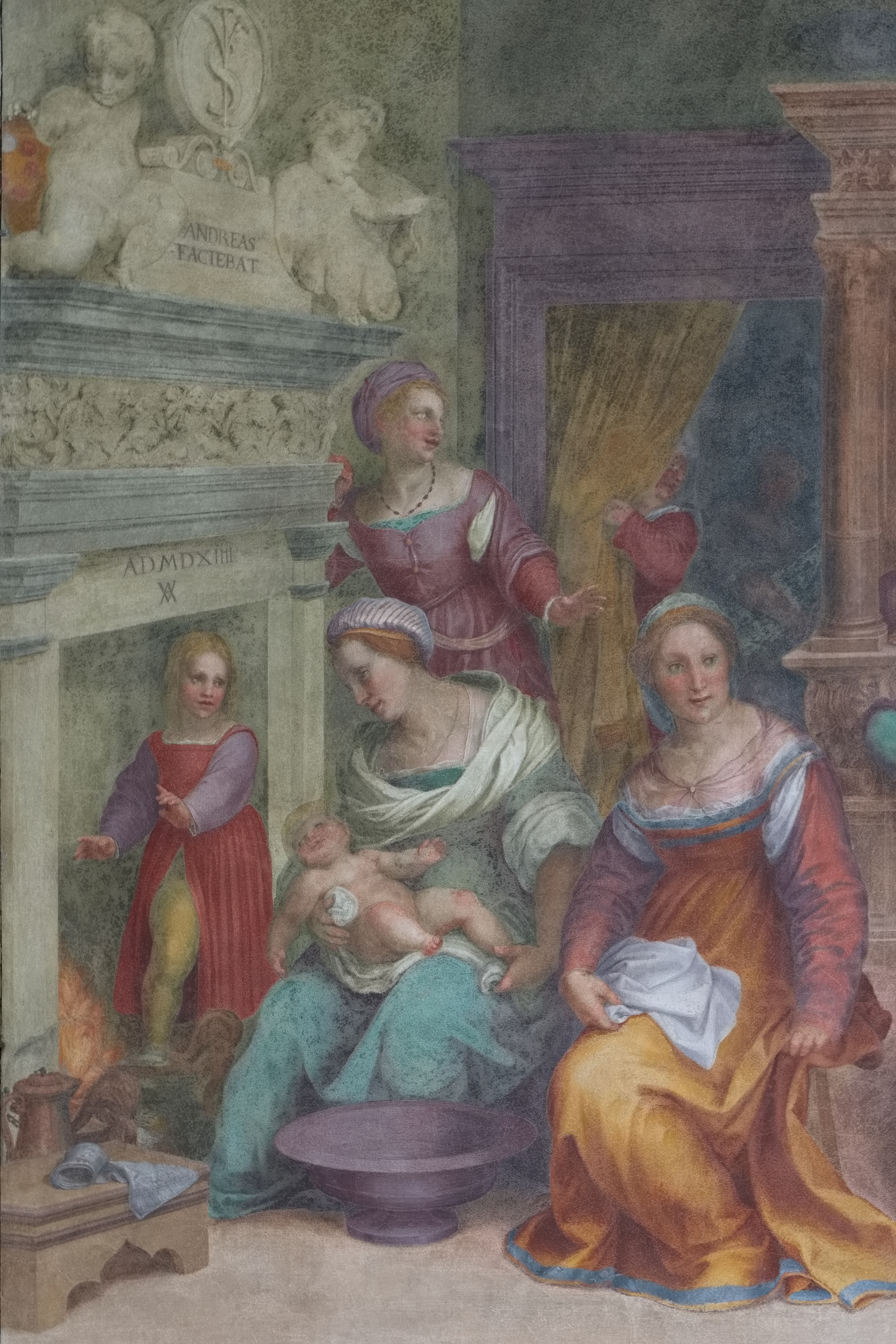
Andrea del Sarto, Birth of the Virgin (detail), 1509–15

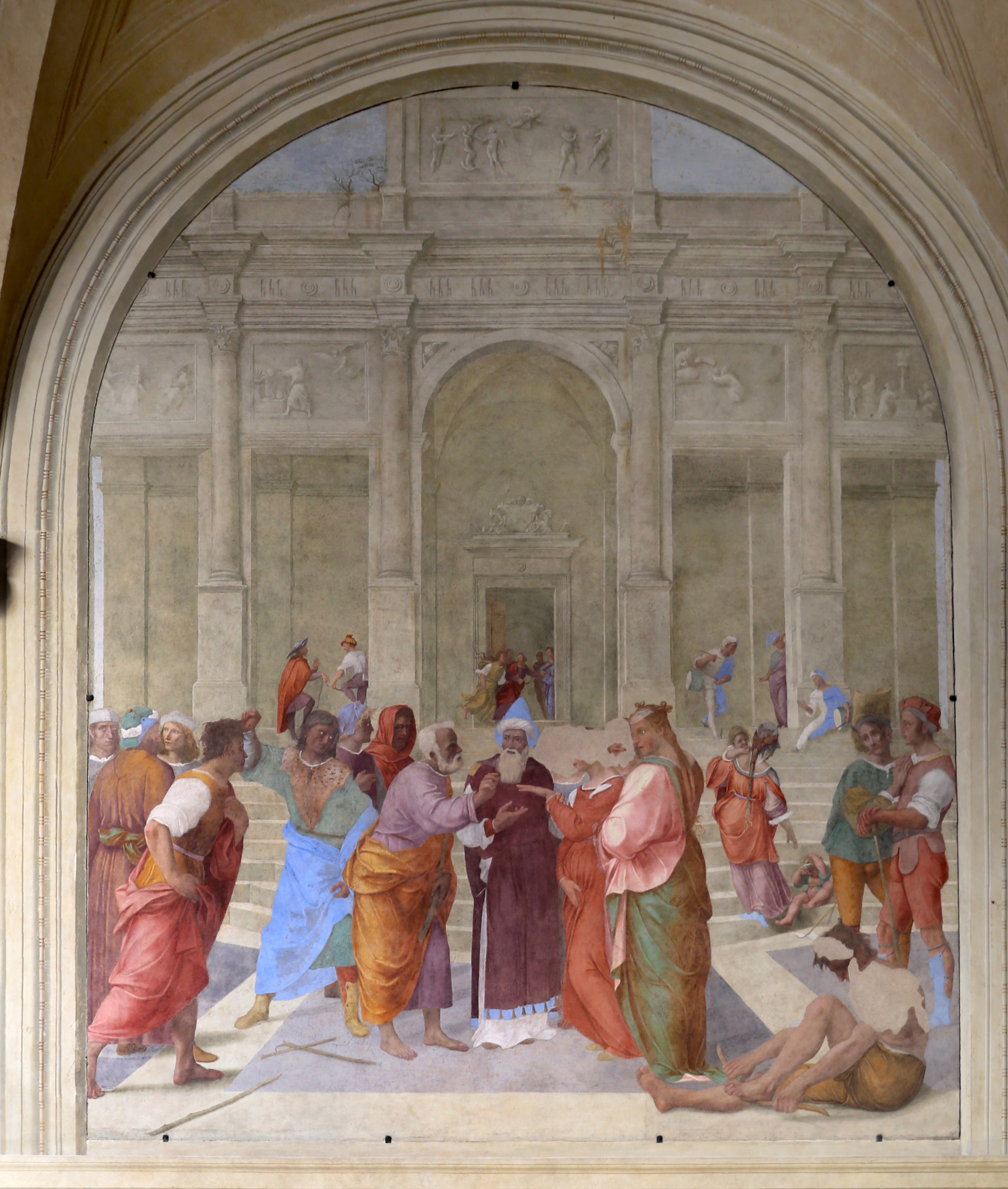
Franciabigio, Marriage of the Virgin, 1513

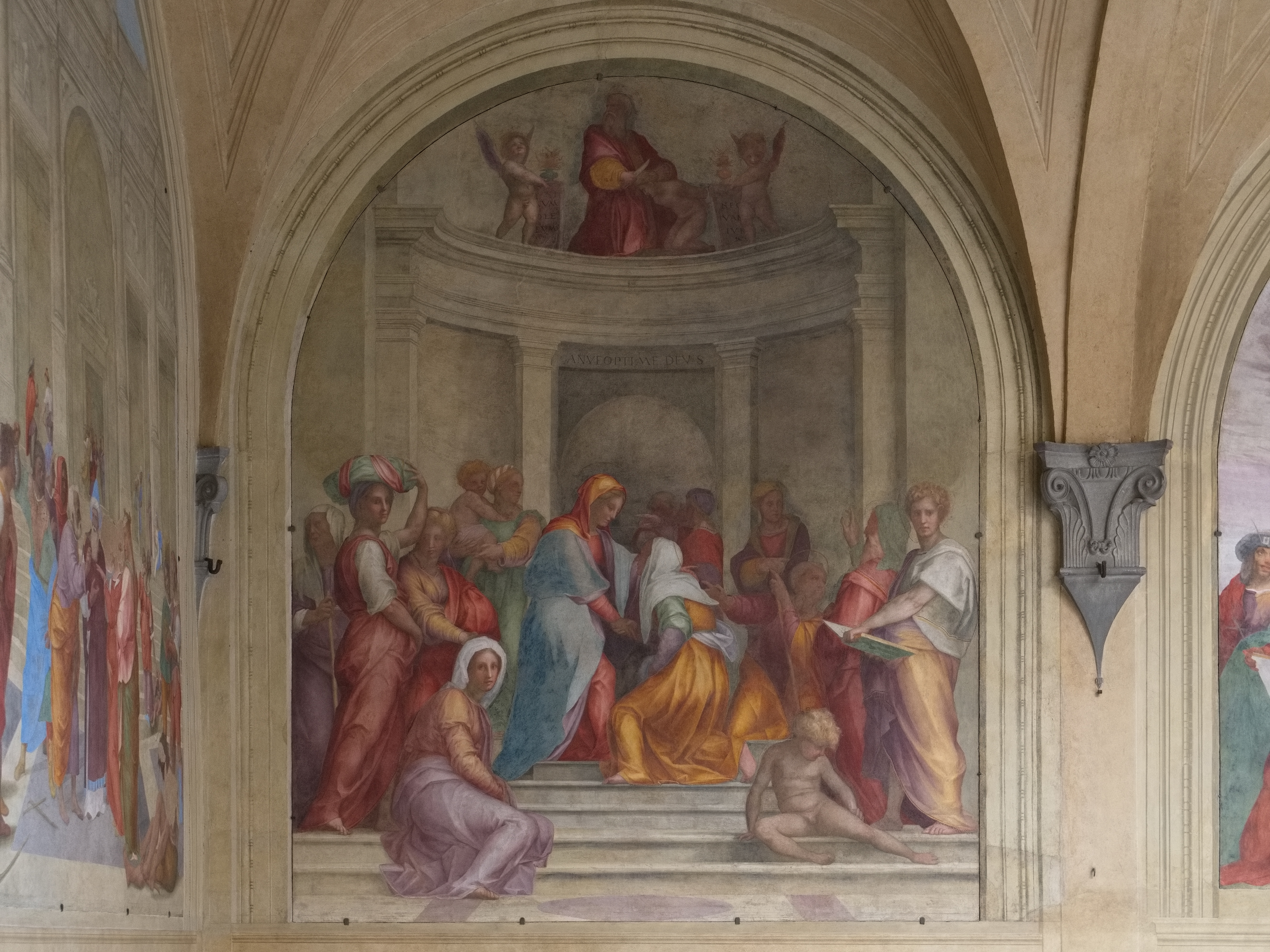
Pontormo, Visitation, 1516

Site	Work	Date	Painter
1st right	Assumption	1513–1514	Rosso Fiorentino
2nd right	Visitation	1516	Pontormo
3rd right	Marriage of the Virgin	1513	Franciabigio
4th right	Birth of the Virgin	1513–1514	Andrea del Sarto
5th right	Voyage of the Magi	1511	Andrea del Sarto
1st–5th left	Life of S. Filippo Benizi	1509–1510	Andrea del Sarto
6th left	Life of S. Filippo Benizzi	1476	Cosimo Rosselli
Just left of entrance to church	Nativity	1460–1462	Alesso Baldovinetti

The large cloister, known as the Chiostro Grande or dei Morti, flanking the northwest of the church, contains the famous frescoed lunette depicting the Madonna del Sacco (1525) by del Sarto.

The Capella di San Luca, which opens off it, has belonged to the artists confraternity or the Accademia delle Arti del Disegno since 1565. Many artists are buried in its vault, including Benvenuto Cellini, Pontormo, Franciabigio, Giovanni Angelo Montorsoli and Lorenzo Bartolini. Inside is Pontormo's Holy Family (c. 1514) painted for church of St. Ruffillo and murals by Alessandro Allori: Trinity; Vasari: St. Luke paints Madonna; and Santi di Tito: Solomon directs the construction of the temple of Jerusalem. The ten large stucco figures were sculpted by Vincenzo Danti, Montorsoli and others.

Most part of the Cloister of SS. Annunziata is today the seat of Istituto Geografico Militare (IGM). In 2007, in the west part of the cloister occupied by the Istituto, the group found a monumental stair by Michelozzo, previously hidden, an Annunciation attributed to Paolo Uccello, and some 'Grottesche' frescoes by Morto da Feltre.

== See also ==
- Accademia delle Arti del Disegno
- Late medieval domes
