= Gregorio Pagani =

Italian painter

- Self-portrait, Uffizi, Florence
- Born: 14 July 1559; Florence, Grand Duchy of Tuscany
- Died: 3 December 1605 (aged 46); Florence, Grand Duchy of Tuscany
- Education: Maso da San Friano; Santi di Tito
- Known for: Painting
- Movement: Mannerism; Baroque
- Patrons: House of Medici

Gregorio Pagani (14 July 1559 – 3 December 1605) was an Italian painter of the late 16th century, mainly active in Florence.

== Biography ==
Gregorio Pagani was born in Florence on 14 July 1559. He was the son of the painter Francesco Pagani. Pagani trained in the studio of the Late Mannerist Maso da San Friano, but then studied with the Counter-Mannerist Santi di Tito. In Santi di Tito's studio he became friends with Ludovico Cigoli: the two artists, who desired to renew the art of painting, studied from nature and developed an interest in Venetian and Bolognese painting.

Pagani's earliest surviving works include the frescoes of the Confirmation of the Rule of St. Dominic (c. 1580; Florence, Santa Maria Novella, Chiostro Grande) and the Meeting between St. Dominic and St. Francis (Florence, Convento dei Cappuccini di Monturghi). In 1592 he painted the Virgin and Saints (Saint Petersburg, Hermitage Museum), a work that already reveals his interest in Correggio. In the same year he painted a Finding of the True Cross (untraced), a daring composition that is preserved in preparatory drawings. A number of works from the 1590s survive and show Pagani’s interest in Emilian art; the Crucifixion and Saints (1595; Florence, San Bartolomeo in Pozzo) and the Virgin and Child with St. Michael the Archangel and St. Benedict (1595; Florence, San Michele Arcangelo Le Ville).

At the turn of the century Pagani was increasingly associated with those Florentine artists who wished to develop a new narrative clarity and directness. Through his friendship with Bartolomeo Carducci he was influenced by Spanish art, as is evident in the Adoration of the Magi (1603; Santa Maria del Carmine, Florence). His last works are the Descent of the Holy Spirit (1603; Pistoia Cathedral) and Tobias Restoring the Sight of his Father (1604; Florence, Galleria Palatina). Pagani died in Florence on 3 December 1605, aged 46. He had a flourishing workshop, which attracted some of the leading painters of early 17-century Florence, including Cristofano Allori and Matteo Rosselli.

== Selected works ==
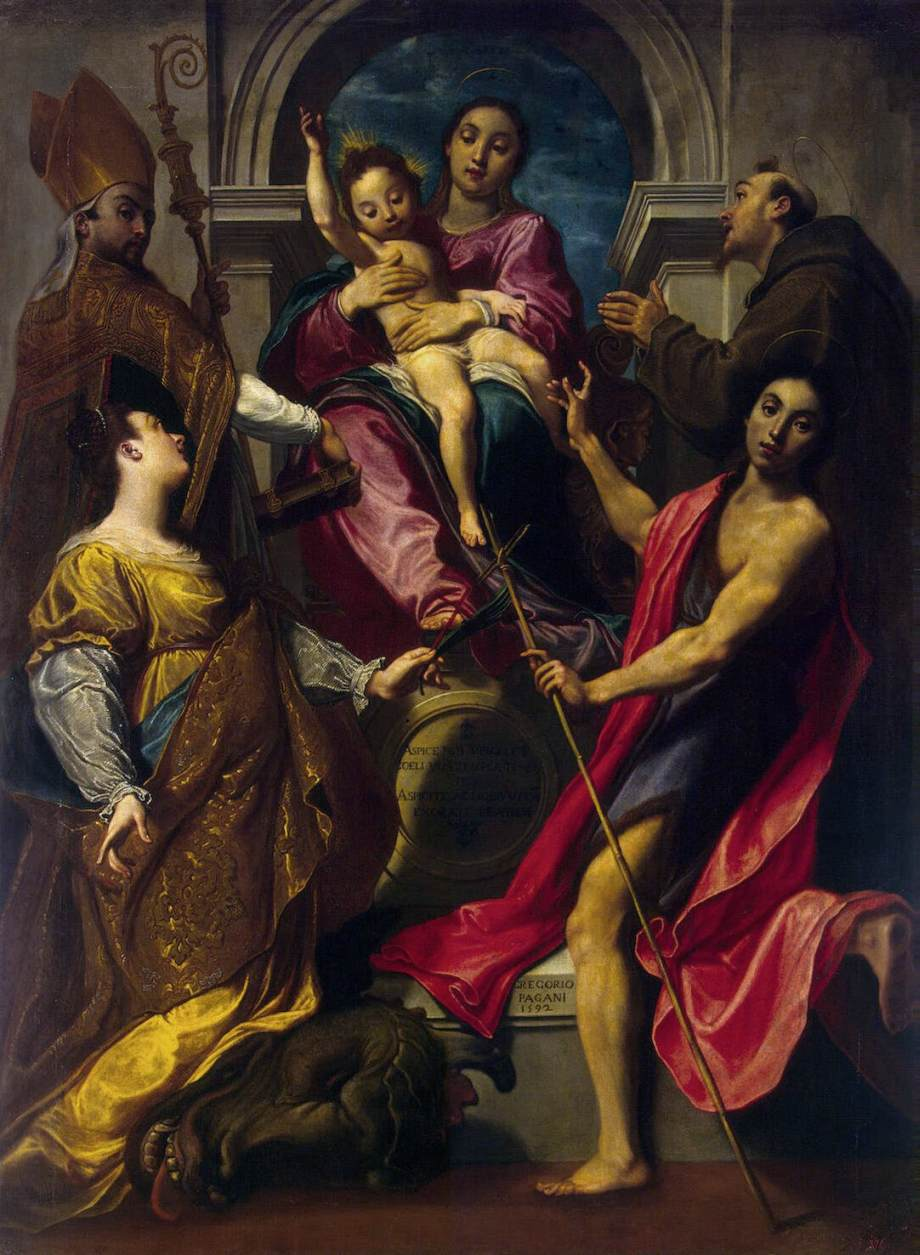
Virgin and Saints, Hermitage Museum, Saint Petersburg

- Confirmation of the Rule of St. Dominic, c. 1580, Florence, Santa Maria Novella, Chiostro Grande;
- Meeting between St. Dominic and St. Francis, Florence, Convento dei Cappuccini di Monturghi;
- Self-portrait, 1592, Uffizi, Florence;
- Virgin and Saints, 1592, Hermitage Museum, Saint Petersburg;
- Crucifixion and Saints, 1595, Florence, San Bartolomeo in Pozzo;
- Virgin and Child with St. Michael the Archangel and St. Benedict, 1595, Florence, San Michele Arcangelo Le Ville;
- Assumption of the Virgin, San Michele a Montevettolini, Monsummano Terme;
- Esther before Ahasuerus, c. 1600, Kunsthistorisches Museum, Vienna;
- Adoration of the Magi, 1603, Santa Maria del Carmine, Florence;
- Descent of the Holy Spirit, 1603, Pistoia Cathedral;
- Tobias Restoring the Sight of his Father, 1604, Florence, Galleria Palatina;
- Gregorio Pagani and Matteo Rosselli, The Wedding at Cana, 1605–08, San Francesco, Pistoia;
- Pyramus and Thisbe, Uffizi, Florence.
Esther before Ahasuerus, c. 1600, Kunsthistorisches Museum, Vienna

Gregorio Pagani and Matteo Rosselli, The Wedding at Cana, 1605–08, San Francesco, Pistoia

Madonna and Child with a martyr and Saint Nicholas, detail of Pagani's frescoes in the Tenuta Corfecciano-Urbana, Montespertoli

Pyramus and Thisbe, Uffizi, Florence

== Biblioraphy ==
- Baldinucci, Filippo (1846). Ferdinando Ranalli (ed.). Notizie de' Professori del Disegno (in Italian). Vol. III. Florence: V. Batelli. pp. 34–55, 240.
- Farquhar, Maria (1855). Ralph Nicholson Wornum (ed.). Biographical catalogue of the principal Italian painters. London: Woodfall & Kinder, Angel Court, Skinner Street. p. 116.
- Mario Bucci; Anna Forlani; Luciano Berti, eds. (1959). Mostra del Cigoli e del suo ambiente (in Italian). Exh. cat. San Miniato: Cassa di risparmio di San Miniato. pp. 208–11.
- Thiem, Christel (1970). Gregorio Pagani: ein Wegbereiter der Florentiner Barockmalerei (in German). Stuttgart: Galerie Valentien.
- Paolucci, Antonio (1979). "Affreschi di Gregorio Pagani". Paragone (in Italian). 30 (353): 90–93.
