= Francesco Bracciolini =

Italian poet (1566–1645)

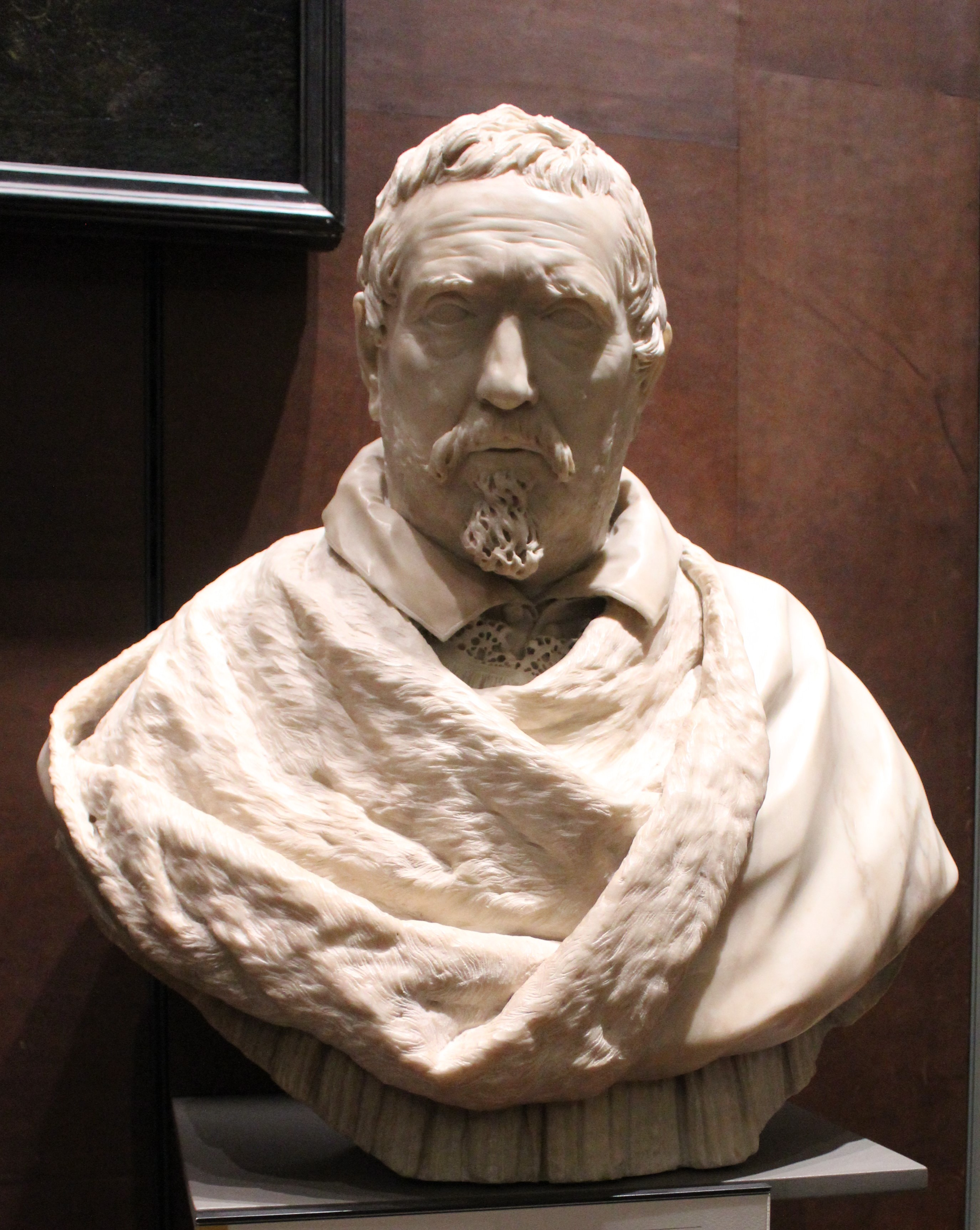
- Bust of Bracciolini by Giuliano Finelli, 1630-31, Victoria and Albert Museum, London
- Born: 26 November 1566; Pistoia, Grand Duchy of Tuscany
- Died: 31 August 1645 (aged 78); Pistoia, Grand Duchy of Tuscany
- Resting place: San Francesco, Pistoia
- Education: University of Bologna
- Occupations: Poet; Intellectual
- Parent(s): Giuliano Bracciolini and Marietta Bracciolini (née Cellesi)
- Writing career
- Language: Italian
- Genre: Epic poetry
- Notable work: Lo Scherno degli Dei (1618)
- Literary movement: Late Renaissance; Baroque

Francesco Bracciolini (Italian: [franˈtʃesko brattʃoˈliːni]; 26 November 1566 – 31 August 1645) was an Italian Late Renaissance poet.

== Biography ==
Bracciolini was born of a noble family in Pistoia in 1566. On his removing to Florence he was admitted into the Accademia Fiorentina, and devoted himself to literature. At Rome he entered the service of Cardinal Maffeo Barberini. He followed Barberini to Paris, where published in 1605 the first cantos of his Croce Racquistata (The Recaptured Cross), an epic poem completed in 1611 and inspired by Torquato Tasso's Jerusalem Delivered. After the death of Clement VIII he returned to his own country; and when his patron Barberini was elected pope, under the name of Urban VIII, Bracciolini repaired to Rome and was made secretary to the pope's brother, Cardinal Antonio Marcello Barberini.

Bracciolini had also the honor conferred on him of taking a surname from the arms of the Barberini family, which were bees; whence he was afterwards known by the name of Bracciolini dell'Api. During Urban's pontificate the poet lived at Rome in considerable reputation, though at the same time he was censored for his sordid avarice.

On the death of the pope Bracciolini returned to Pistoia, where he died in 1645. There is scarcely any species of poetry, epic, dramatic, pastoral, lyric or burlesque, which Bracciolini did not attempt; but he is principally noted for his mock-heroic poem Lo Scherno degli Dei (The Derision of the Gods) published in 1618, similar but confessedly inferior to the contemporary work of Alessandro Tassoni, La secchia rapita.

Of his serious heroic poems the most celebrated is La Croce Racquistata. This poem in thirty-five books on the subject of the recovery of the True Cross was intended to continue the tradition of the Orlando Furioso and the Jerusalem Delivered, and while those poems celebrated the House of Este in Ferrara, Bracciolini's verses glorified and provided an ancient imperial genealogy for the Medici Grand Dukes of Late Renaissance Tuscany.

La Croce Racquistata is regarded as one of the best of the epic poems written in Italy after Ariosto's and Tasso's masterworks. First published in Paris in 1605, it was reprinted several times and exerted a strong influence on the works of many subsequent poets (Girolamo Graziani perhaps most prominent among them). It is held in high esteem by Italian literary critics. The episode of Alceste and Elisa is particularly praised.

Another epic by Bracciolini, La Bulgheria Convertita, celebrated the conversinon of the Bulgars. Bracciolini left also a series of unpublished letters on poetic theory that have been collected in a modern edition by Guido Baldassarri.

== Works ==
- Bracciolini, Francesco (1611). Croce racquistata. Venezia: appresso Bernardo Giunti, Gio. Battista Ciotti, & compagni.
- Bracciolini, Francesco (1613) [1612]. L'Evandro, Tragedia (2 ed.). Firenze: appresso Giandonato, e Bernardino Giunti, e compagni.
- Bracciolini, Francesco (1613). L'Harpalice, tragedia. Firenze: Appresso Giandonato e Bernardino Giunti e compagni.
- Bracciolini, Francesco (1618). Dello scherno degli Dei. Firenze: appresso Paolo Guerigli.
- Bracciolini, Francesco (1628). L'elettione di Urbano Papa VIII. Roma: s.n.t.
- Bracciolini, Francesco (1630). La Roccella espugnata. Roma: Giacomo Mascardi.
- Bracciolini, Francesco (1637). La Bulgheria convertita. Roma: Giacomo Mascardi.

== English translations ==
- The Tragedie of Alceste and Eliza, As it is found in Italian, in La Croce racquistata. Collected, and translated into English, in the same verse, and number, By Fr. Br. Gent. At the request of the right vertuous Lady, the Lady Anne Wingfield, Wife unto that noble Knight, Sir Anthony Wingfield Baronet his Majesties High Shiriffe for the County of Suffolke. London: Printed by Th. Harper for Iohn Waterson and are to be sold at his shop in Pauls Churchyard at the signe of the Crown. 1638.

== Bibliography ==
- This article incorporates text from a publication now in the public domain: Chisholm, Hugh, ed. (1911). "Bracciolini, Francesco". Encyclopædia Britannica. Vol. 4 (11th ed.). Cambridge University Press. p. 358.
- Barbi, Michele (1897). Notizia della vita e delle opere di Francesco Bracciolini. Florence: Sansoni.
- Giachino, Luisella (2003). "Dalla storia al mito. «La Roccella espugnata» di Francesco Bracciolini". Studi secenteschi. XLIV: 167–195.
- Quint, David (2004). "Francesco Bracciolini as a Reader of Ariosto and Tasso in La Croce racquistata". L'Arme e gli amori: Ariosto, Tasso and Guarini in Late Renaissance Florence. Florence: Leo S. Olschki. pp. 59–77.
- Baldassarri, Guido (2005). "Sulla «Croce racquistata»". In Marco Faini; Tiziana Mattioli (eds.). Dopo Tasso. Percorsi del poema eroico. Roma-Padova: Antenore. pp. 63–94. ISBN 978-88-8455-597-7.
- Grootveld, Emma (2017). "Celebrare Luigi XIII dopo Tasso: «La Roccella Espugnata» di Francesco Bracciolini". In Tancredi Artico; Enrico Zucchi (eds.). La fortuna del Tasso eroico tra Sei e Settecento. Modelli interpretativi e pratiche di riscrittura. Alessandria: Edizioni dell'Orso. pp. 123–137. ISBN 978-88-6274-790-5.
- Carminati, Clizia (2018). "Poesia e corte barberiniana: sulla Bulgheria convertita di Francesco Bracciolini". Filologia e Critica. 2 (2): 202–225. doi:10.1400/280520.
- Zucchi, Enrico (2019). "La discrezione di Ulisse e la gelosia delle amazzoni: classicismo e modernità nella Pentesilea di Francesco Bracciolini". Rivista di letteratura italiana. XXXVII (1): 67–79. doi:10.19272/201902201005.
- Contini, Federico (2019). "Un caso seicentesco di parodia militante: Lo Scherno degli dèi di Francesco Bracciolini". Studi italiani. 62 (2): 77–89. doi:10.1400/274103.
- Artico, Tancredi (2019). "Dalla parte di Tasso. Bracciolini nel cimento dell'epica". Studi Tassiani. LVII: 203–219.
- Federico Contini; Andrea Lazzarini, eds. (2020). Francesco Bracciolini. Gli 'ozi' e la corte. Pisa: Pisa University Press. ISBN 978-8833393001.
- Contini, Federico (2021). "Il diritto angusto calle dell'epica post-tassiana: norme, modelli e soluzioni narrative nella Croce racquistata di Francesco Bracciolini". Esperienze Letterarie. XLVI (2): 73–86. doi:10.19272/202107902006.
