= Counter-Maniera =

16th-century Italian artistic trend

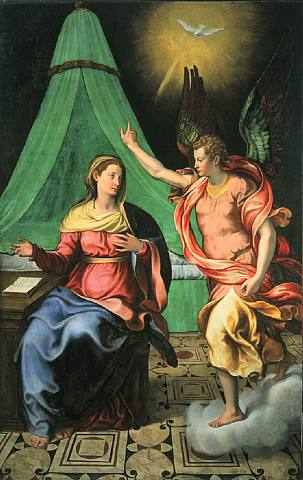
Girolamo Siciolante da Sermoneta, Annunciation

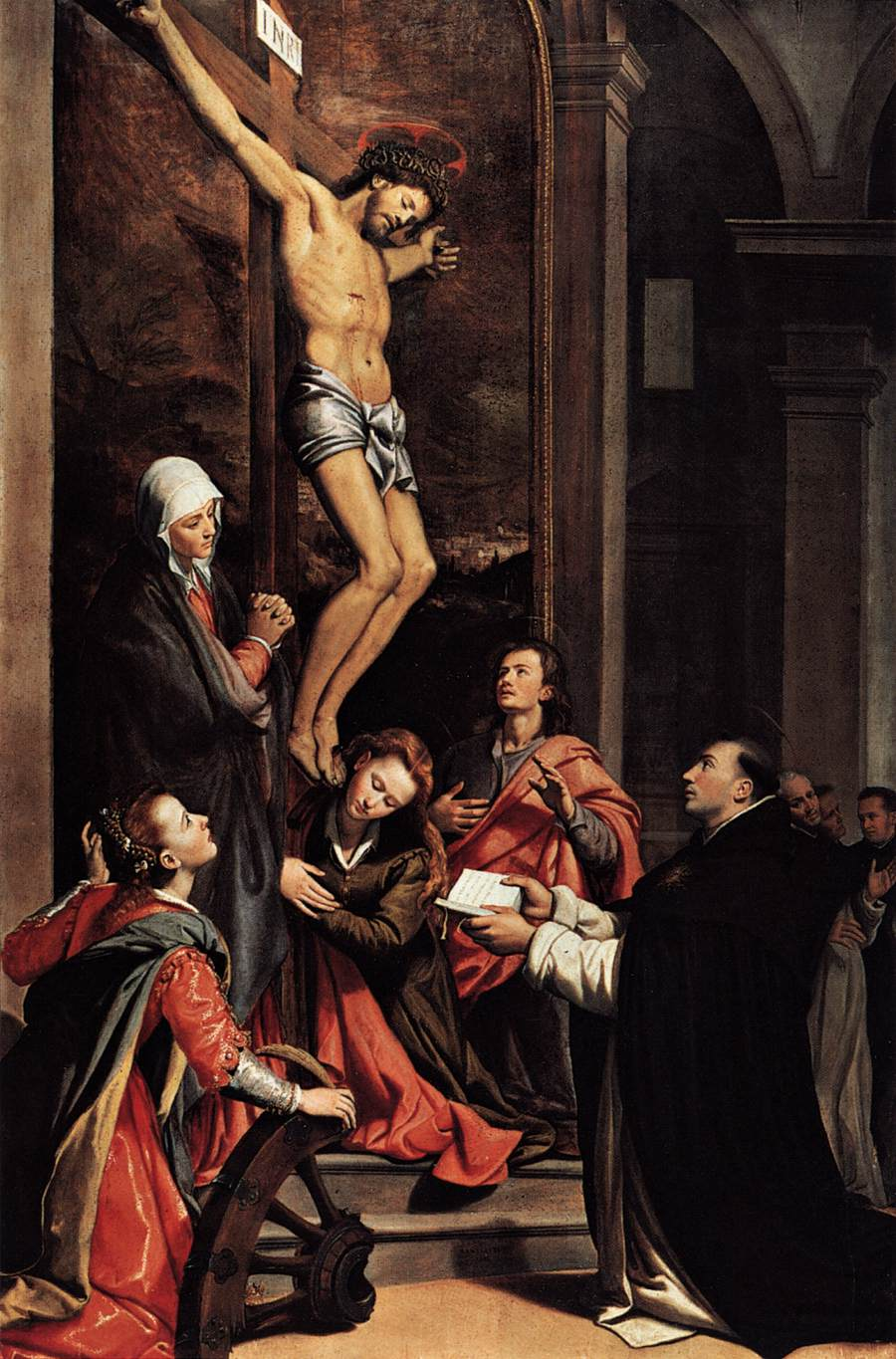
Santi di Tito, Vision of St Thomas Aquinas (1593)

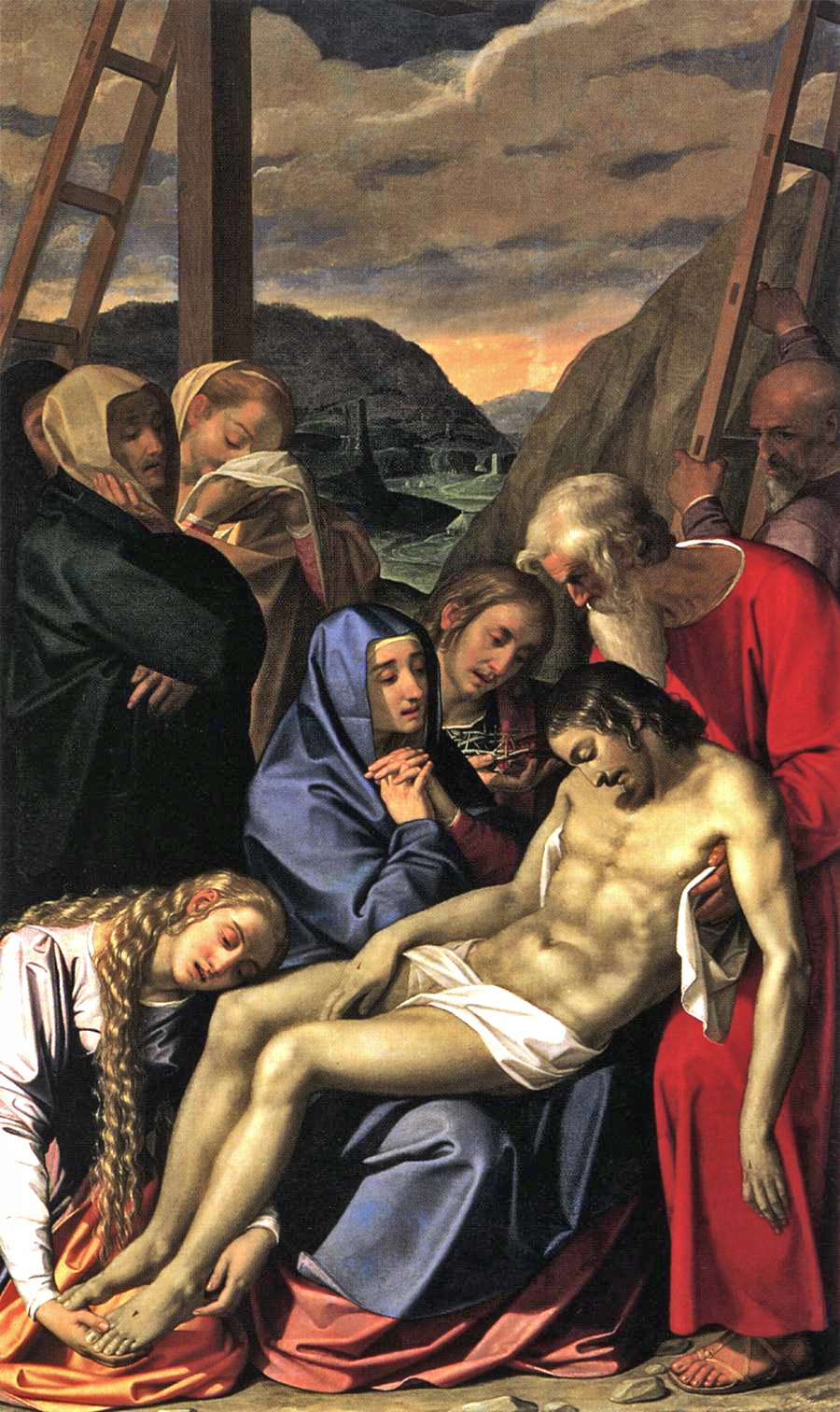
Lamentation, Scipione Pulzone, 1593

Counter-Maniera or Counter-Mannerism (variously capitalized and part-italicized) is a term in art history for a trend identified by some art historians in 16th-century Italian painting that forms a sub-category or phase of Mannerism, the dominant movement in Italian art between about 1530 and 1590. Counter-Maniera or Counter-Mannerism reacted against the artificiality of the second generation of Mannerist painters in the second half of the 16th century. It was in part due to artists wishing to follow the vague prescriptions for clarity and simplicity in art issued by the Council of Trent in its final session in 1563, and represented a rejection of the distortions and artificiality of high Mannerist style, and a partial return to the classicism and balance of High Renaissance art, with "clarity in formal order and legibility in content".

The term was devised by the art historian Sydney Joseph Freedberg (1914–1997), and has gained a good degree of acceptance, although it is by no means universally adopted by other art historians. Counter-Maniera was one of the four phases of 16th-century Italian painting defined by Freedberg in his Painting in Italy, 1500–1600, first published in 1971 and long the standard textbook on the period, as: "First Maniera, High Maniera, Counter-Maniera and Late Maniera". The styles did not neatly succeed each other but existed side by side for much of the time, with High Maniera remaining the dominant style during the main period of Counter-Maniera in the third quarter of the 16th century. In many cases Counter-Mannerism was a development of an artist's style in mid or late career, or a style used for some works, especially religious commissions, while other works by the same artist continued to use a high maniera style.

Freedberg's contemporary Federico Zeri had in 1957 introduced or revived his own term arte sacra ("sacred art") for pre-Baroque Counter-Reformation style in Roman painting, overlapping to a large degree with Freedberg's Counter-Maniera, though rather wider in both the dates and styles included. The use of the term Counter-Maniera may be in decline, as impatience with such "style labels" grows among art historians. In 2000 Marcia B. Hall, a leading art historian of the period and mentee of Freedberg, was criticised by a reviewer of her After Raphael: Painting in Central Italy in the Sixteenth Century for her "fundamental flaw" in continuing to use this and other terms, despite an apologetic "Note on style labels" at the beginning of the book and a promise to keep their use to a minimum.

== Scope and characteristics ==
The definition of Mannerism itself is notoriously complex, and that of Counter-Mannerism, which to a considerable extent is defined negatively or reductively against it, is no less so. Many parts of Italy, led by Venice and other northern centres, were on the periphery of both the High Renaissance and the Mannerist reaction, and reached what might be called a Counter-Mannerist style merely by continuing to develop regional Renaissance styles, and accepting moderate doses of maniera influence. The term is most often applied to painters in Florence and Rome who reacted against the prevailing style in these centres of full-blooded maniera, without a fundamental rejection of its underlying principles. In proposing the term Freedberg compares it with terms such as "counterpart" and "counterpoint", explaining that he intends "implying parallelism and relation between two terms at the same time as their opposition".

Characteristics of the maniera often retained in counter-maniera works, though in moderation, are an idealized and abstracted treatment of the content, absence of naturalism, an avoidance of the expression of emotion, and many of the formal characteristics noted by Friedländer, such as the arrangement of figures on the same plane at the front of the picture space, which they nearly fill. Elements of the maniera that are removed include the impulse to push to the extreme, the willingness to sacrifice everything for a graceful effect, playfulness and wit, and the readiness to let the details and ambience of a painting crowd out or submerge the supposed main figures, that must be hunted out by the learned viewer. The style restores a decorum suitable for religious works, and removes distractions from the central religious figures. In its latest phase, from about 1585, the need for popular appeal appears to have been recognized by artists and commissioners in the church, leading to some relaxation of the austerity of earlier periods, and sometimes to sentimentality.

The term counter-maniera is not usually applied to the more radical Bolognese reaction of the Carraccis from the 1580s, although this represented a more effective rejection of Mannerist artificiality. For Freedberg this was "a new and un-Maniera attitude to art"; elsewhere he cautions against confusing Counter-Maniera with "anti-Maniera", apparently reflecting "Anti-Mannerism", the term used by Walter Friedländer for the "palpable break in the stylistic development of Italian painting" that occurred "sometime around 1590". The use of the term has not been extended to Northern Mannerism.

Deciding what characterizes a work in Counter-Mannerist style may not be straightforward; in the single brief passage mentioning the term in John Shearman's Mannerism (1967), he picks the altarpiece of Vision of St Thomas Aquinas (1593, illustrated here, as in both books) by Santi di Tito as an example of it, but Freedberg excludes Santo's classicising naturalism from the style, though noting his similarities to it. Shearman's other main example of Counter-Mannerism is Federigo Barocci, who Freedberg also excludes from his definition.

== Influences ==
Many painters looked to revive the styles of Raphael, Andrea del Sarto and other High Renaissance masters, or drew inspiration from the Venetian masters of the High Renaissance. The example of Michelangelo's late work was important for many artists. The Florentine biographer and critic Raffaello Borghini, author of Il Riposo della Pitura e della Scultura published in 1584, has been proposed as a theorist, rather late into the course of the trend, but his work is little known. The artists of Counter-Mannerism remain relatively unknown, and often hard to see outside Italy, as much of their work was religious and remains in the churches for which it was commissioned, or Italian museums. It was mostly ignored in the hunt by picture dealers in the 18th and 19th centuries. Freedberg says frankly: "Boredom is a requisite of the Roman Counter-Maniera style, invading even the art of the few painters whose inspiration may be too considerable and too authentic to be sealed off wholly".

Freedberg cautions against treating the style as simply a reflection of the decrees of Trent, which were a last minute and little-discussed addition, based on a French draft, to the final session in 1563, well after the style had begun to show itself. He describes the decrees as "a codifying and official sanction of a temper that had come to be conspicuous in Roman culture".

Freedberg, like the majority of art historians dealing with the period—even today—tended to view mid-to-late sixteenth-century and early seventeenth-century Italian art history through the singular pro-Roman Bolognese lens of Gian Pietro Bellori's Lives of the Modern Painters, Sculptors and Architects - meaning Freedberg may have had little time for any alternative historical narrative that did not support a "pro-Bolognese" artistic account of Counter-Maniera reform.

== Painters in styles described as Counter-Maniera or Counter-Mannerist ==
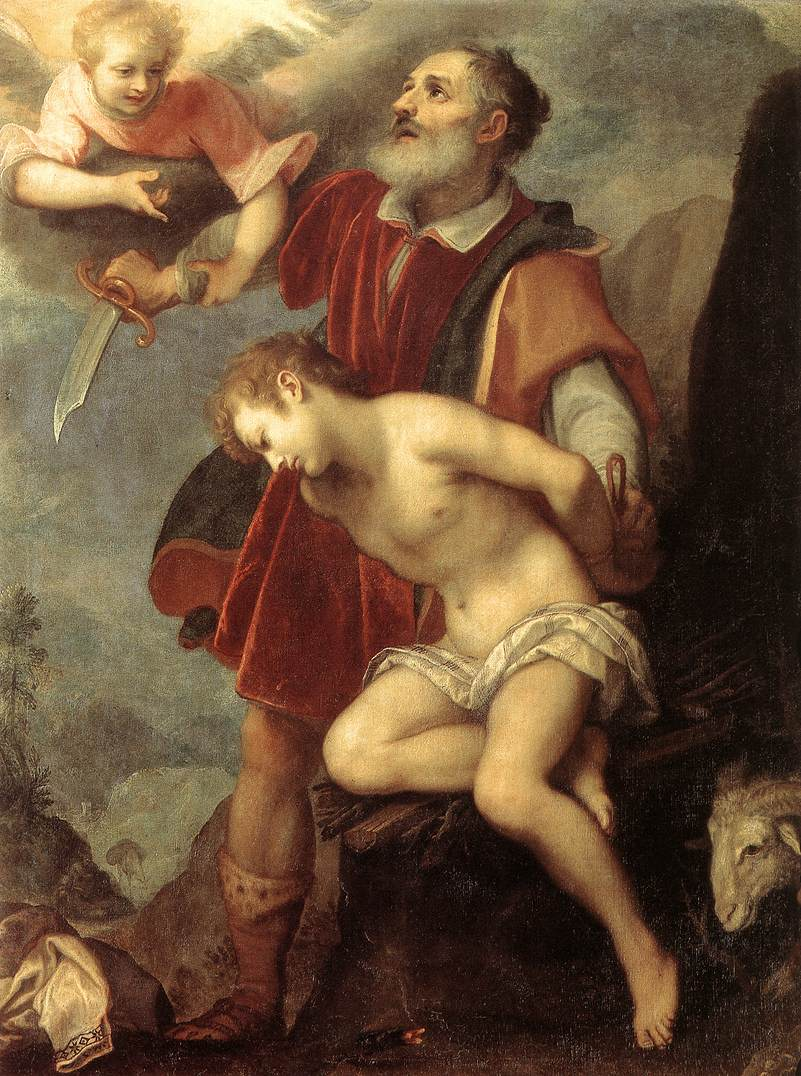
The Sacrifice of Isaac, by Ludovico Cigoli

=== In Rome ===
- Daniele da Volterra
- Marcello Venusti
- Jacopino del Conte
- Girolamo Siciolante da Sermoneta
- Scipione Pulzone
- Girolamo Muziano
- Federico Zuccari
- Cristoforo Roncalli
- Giuseppe Cesari
- Cigoli (Lodovico Cardi, a Florentine)

=== Florentines ===
- Domenico Cresti (Il Passignano)
- Lodovico Cigoli
- Jacopo Chimenti da Empoli
- Andrea Boscoli
- Gregorio Pagani
- Santi di Tito
- Bernardino Poccetti
- Francesco Curradi
- Antonio Tempesta
- Maso da San Friano
