= Scipione Pulzone =

Italian painter

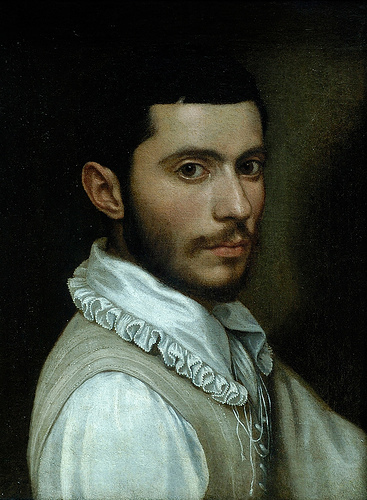
- Self portrait
- Born: 1544; Gaeta, Kingdom of Naples
- Died: February 1, 1598 (aged 53–54); Rome
- Known for: painting

Scipione Pulzone (1544 – February 1, 1598), also known as Il Gaetano, was a Neapolitan painter of the late Italian Renaissance. His work differs in several respects from the Mannerist style predominant at the time. He was active mainly in Rome, but also worked in Naples and Florence. It is thought that he studied under Jacopino del Conte in Rome.

Best known for his portraits, Pulzone painted Pope Gregory XIII, Cardinal de' Medici and Francesco I de' Medici, Grand Duke of Tuscany, Eleanor de' Medici, and Marie de' Medici. He also painted an Assumption with the Apostles for San Silvestro al Quirinale; a Pietà for the Gesù; and a Crucifixion for Santa Maria in Vallicella.

Pulzone's Mater Divinae Providentiae, painted around 1580, inspired the Roman Catholic cult of devotion to Our Lady of Providence.

== Biography ==
Born in Gaeta around 1550 and initially trained in the workshop of Jacopino del Conte, Pulzone was one of the most original pictorial interpreters of the age of the Counter-Reformation and one of the most esteemed artists active in Rome in the second half of the 16th century. Many of his works, and especially the religious paintings, betray the marked influence of Girolamo Siciolante da Sermoneta. He excelled above all in portraiture, displaying particularly high artistic quality in the rendering of details. He worked at the Neapolitan and Florentine courts as well as in Rome, where he also painted the portraits of the popes of his day, namely Pius V and Gregory XIII. His major religious works included the Our Lady of the Assumption in the church of San Silvestro al Quirinale and the Christ on the Cross with Saints in Santa Maria in Vallicella in Rome.

Pulzone died in Rome in 1598.
