= Santi di Tito =

Italian painter (1536–1603)

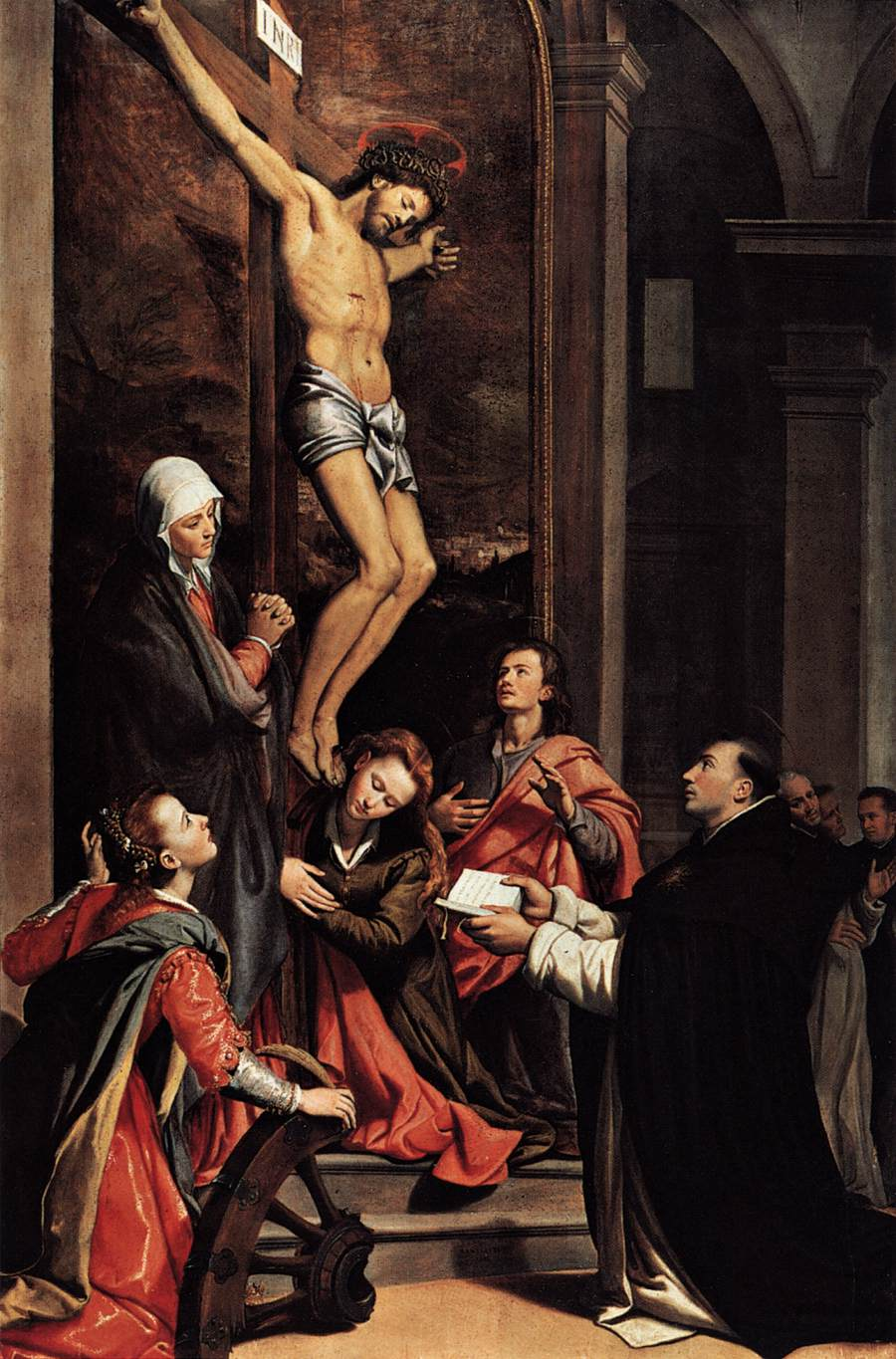
Vision of St Thomas Aquinas (1593)

Santi di Tito (5 December 1536 – 25 July 1603) was one of the most influential and leading Italian painters of the proto-Baroque style – what is sometimes referred to as "Counter-Maniera" or Counter-Mannerism.

== Biography ==
He was born in Sansepolcro. There is little documentation to support the alleged training under Bronzino or Baccio Bandinelli. From 1558 to 1564, he worked in Rome on frescoes in Palazzo Salviati and the Sala Grande of the Belvedere (Homage of the People) alongside Giovanni de' Vecchi and Niccolò Circignani. He acquired a classical trait, described as Raphaelesque by S. J. Freedberg. This style contrasted with the reigning ornate Roman painterliness of Federico and Taddeo Zuccari or their Florentine equivalents: Vasari, Alessandro Allori, and Bronzino.

After returning to Florence in 1564, he joined the Accademia del Disegno. He contributed two conventionally Mannerist paintings for the Duke's study and laboratory, the Studiolo of Francesco I in the Palazzo Vecchio. This artistic project was partly overseen by Giorgio Vasari. These paintings – the Sisters of Fetonte (Phaeton) and Hercules and Iole – like many of those in the studiolo, are stylized and overcrowded.

Baldinucci recounts that Santi completely rejected the maniera of Bronzino, and embraced a classical Reformist and naturalistic style. Santi went on to contribute a Sacra Conversazione for the Ognissanti and painted two altarpieces for Santa Croce in Florence: a crowded but monumental Resurrection (1570–74), and a creatively inspired and decorous Supper at Emmaus (1574).

Santi also painted a Resurrection of Lazarus for Volterra Cathedral; a Madonna for San Salvatore al Vescovo; a Burial of Christ for S. Giuseppe; a Baptism of Christ by St John for the Corsini palace, Florence. Santi died in Florence on 25 July 1603.

Santi's mature style and likely his masterpiece is found in his masterpiece of the Vision of Saint Thomas Aquinas, also known as Saint Thomas dedicating his works to Christ located in the church of San Marco in Florence. It expresses a simple, pious gesture that appeared to have been lost from the courtly sensibility of Italian painting since the days of Raphael, while maintaining the brittle, demarcated colour that is classic of Tuscan works. The work has an earnest fervour lacking in his earlier mannerist works, which sometimes appear like a collection of posed statues over-painted with skin hues. This new contra-maniera style finds some echoes in the rising Bolognese Baroque style of the Carracci.

Among his pupils were Ludovico Cigoli, the leading painter of art Reform in late sixteenth and early seventeenth century Florence. Another pupil named Francesco Mochi became a prominent sculptor in the Baroque style and created, among other pieces, the colossal Saint Veronica, in the crossing of St. Peter's Basilica in Rome."

== Works ==
Paintings

- Resurrection of Lazarus (1576) - Santa Maria Novella, Florence
- Sacred Conversation
- Annunciation (1576) - Santa Maria Novella, Florence
- Building of the Temple of Solomon (1570-71) - Chapel of St Luke, Annunziata
- Sisters of Phaeton (1572) - Studiolo of Francesco I, Palazzo Vecchio, Florence
- Hercules and Iole (1572) - Studiolo of Francesco I, Palazzo Vecchio, Florence
- Pietà with Saints and Military Officer - Galleria degli Uffizi, Florence
- Holy Family with St. Elizabeth and John the Baptist
- Tobie and the Angel (circa 1575) - Saint-Eustache, Paris
- Doubting Thomas (1583) - Duomo, Borgo San Sepolcro
- Crucifixion (1588) - Santa Croce, Florence
- Marriage at Cana (1593) - Villa I Collazzi, near Scandicci
- Supper at Emmaus (1588) - Sant Croce
- Annunciation (1602) - Santa Maria Novella
- Four ages of Woman and the Written Law - Musee Fesch, Ajaccio
- Christ - Mykolas Zilinskas Art Museum, Kaunas, Lithuania
- Rebecca and Eliezer at the Well - Blanton Art Museum, Austin, Texas

Architecture

- San Tommaso d'Aquino oratory, in Florence
- Saint Micheal Rotunda, in Petrognano
- Palazzo Nonfinito staircase, in Florence
- Palazzo Dardinelli-Fenzi, in Florence
- Palazzo Zanchini-Corbinelli, in Florence
- Palazzo di Santi di Tito (own house), in Florence
- San Michele Convent (Villa di Doccia), near Fiesole
- Villa di Motrone, in Peretola (Florence)
- Villa dei Collazzi, in Giogoli (Scandicci)
- Villa Le Corti, in San Casciano

== Gallery ==
Portraits

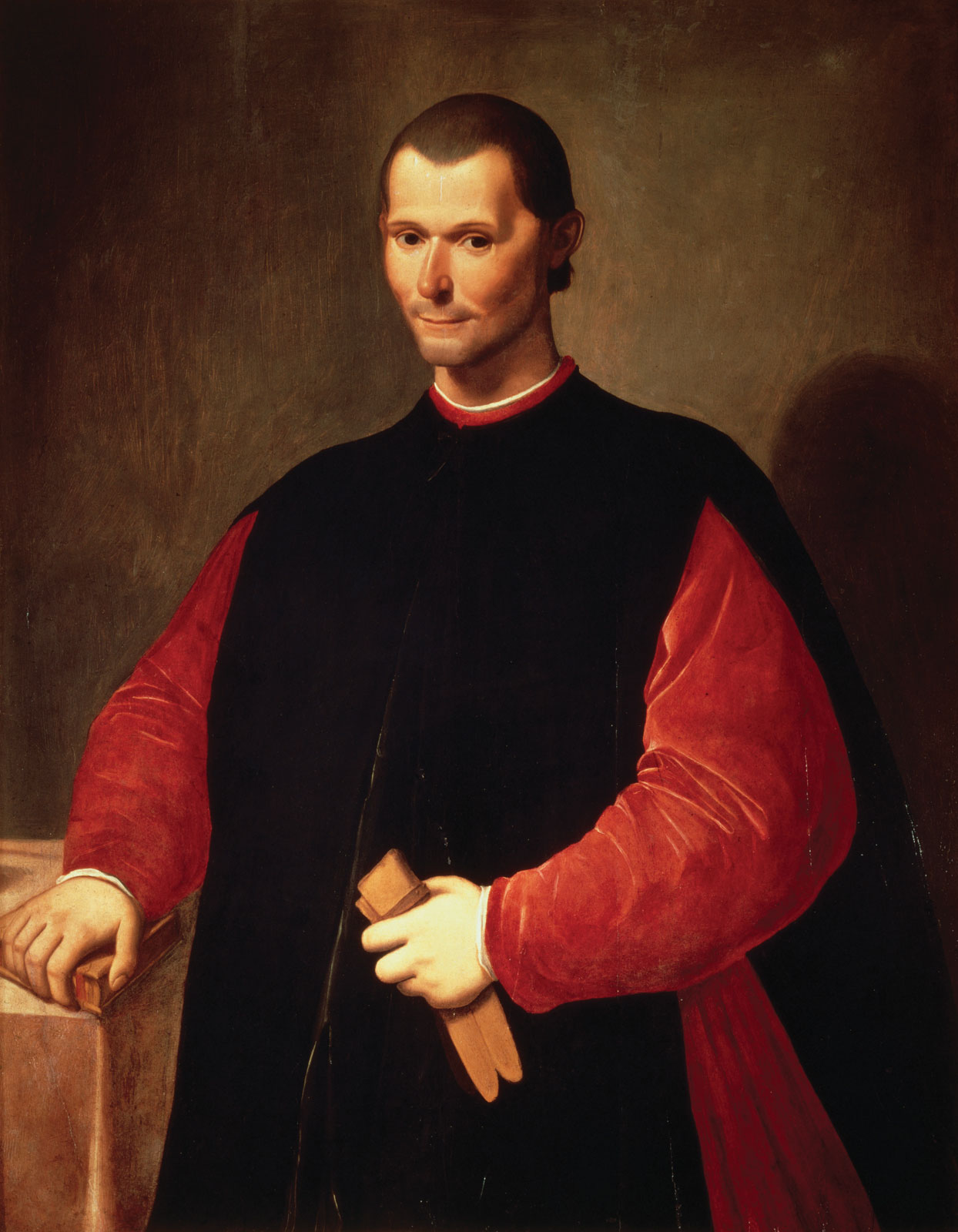
Niccolò Machiavelli

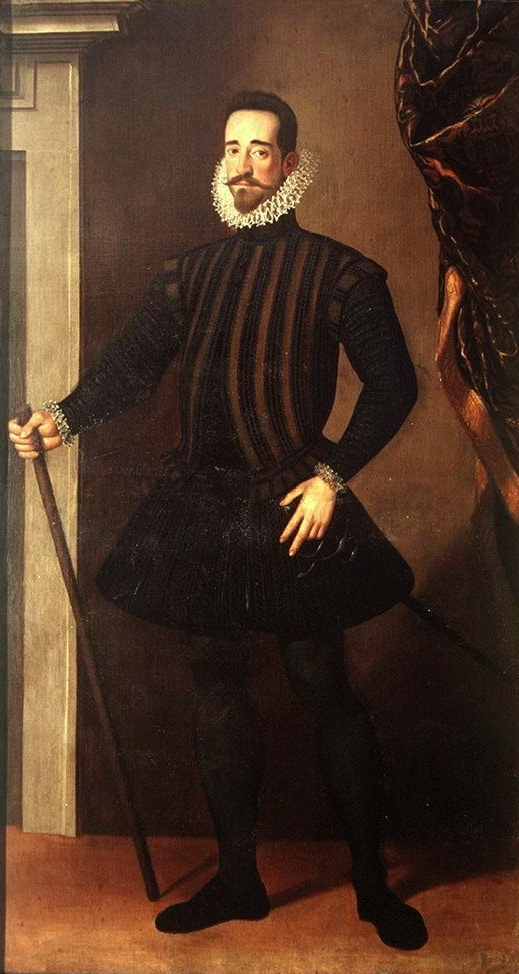
Pietro de' Medici

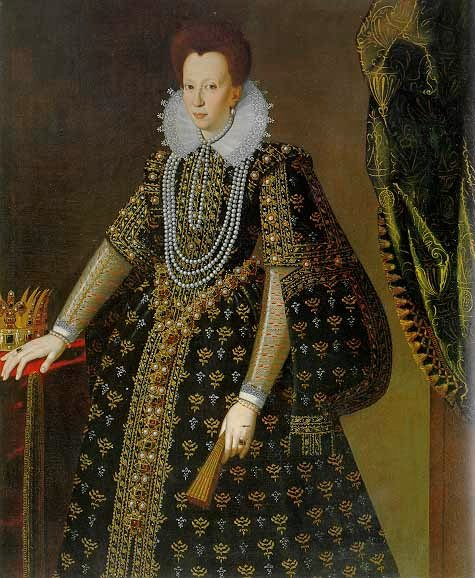
Cristina di Lorena

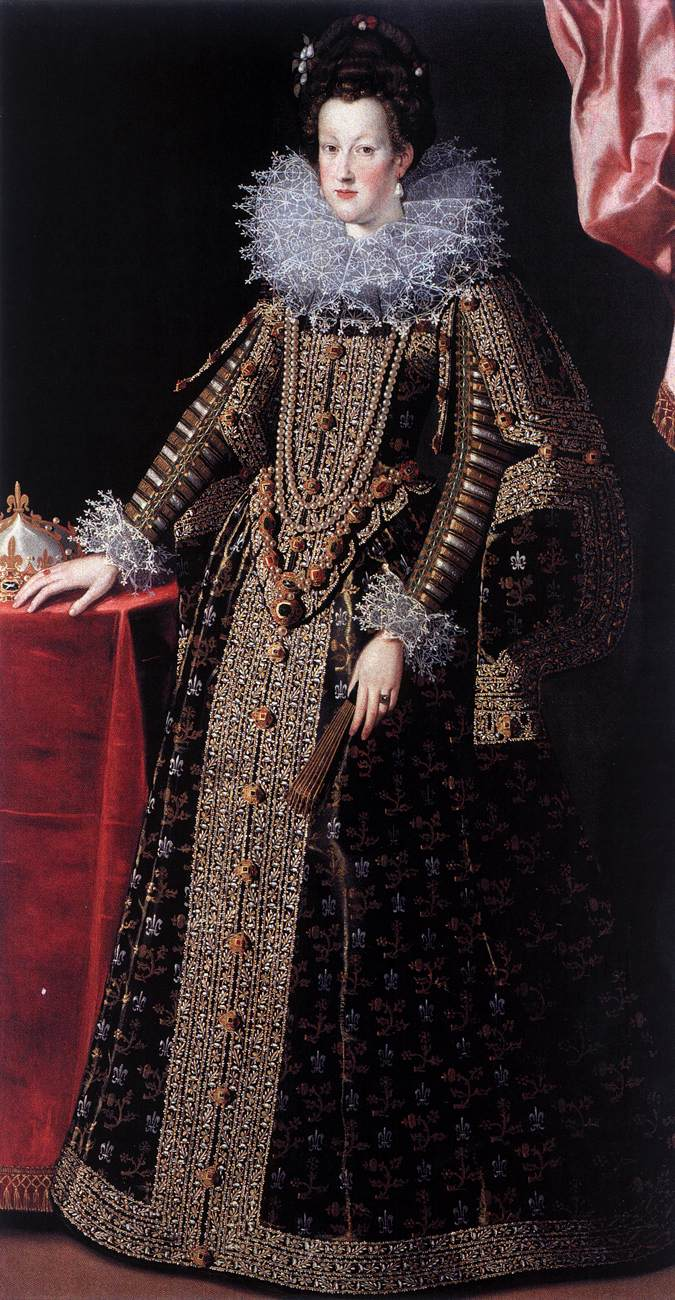
Maria de' Medici

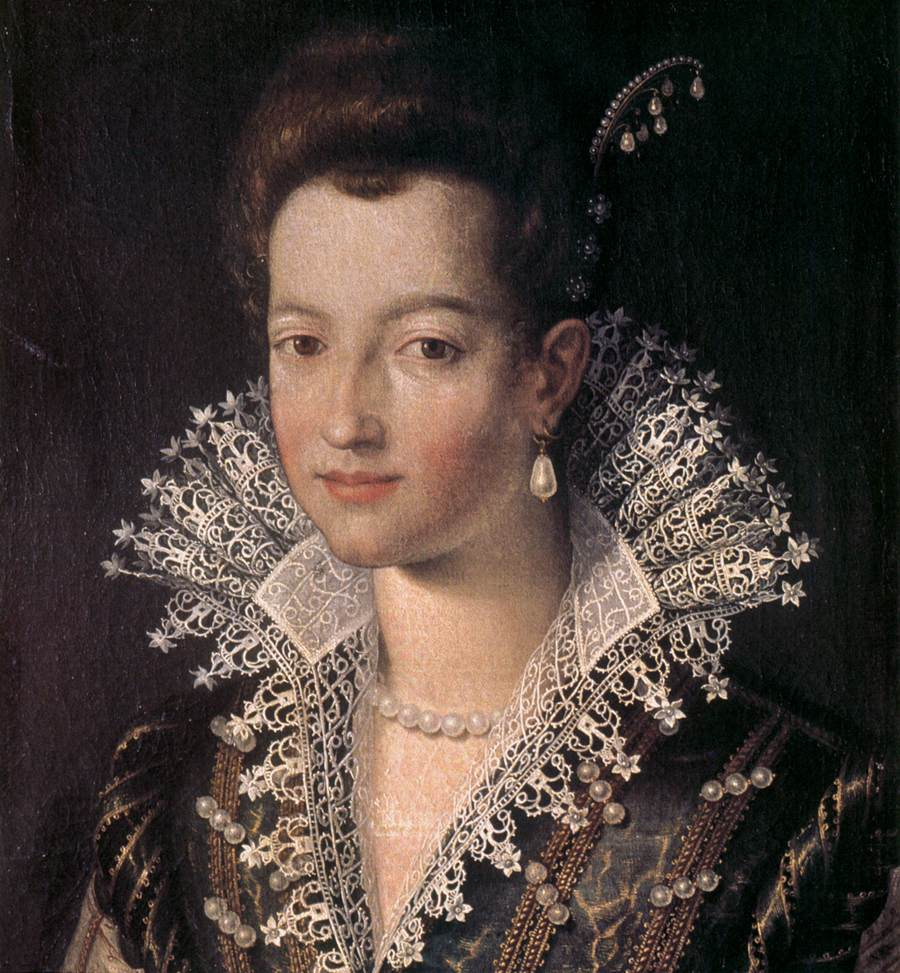
Maria de' Medici

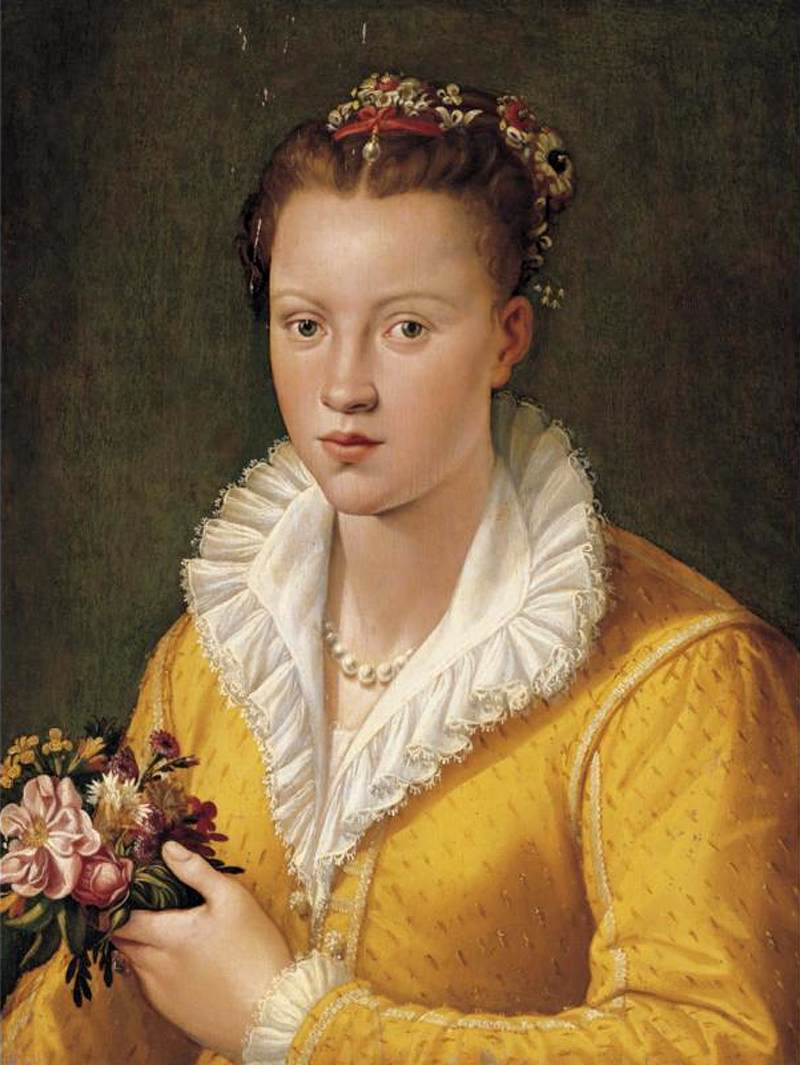
Portrait of a Girl

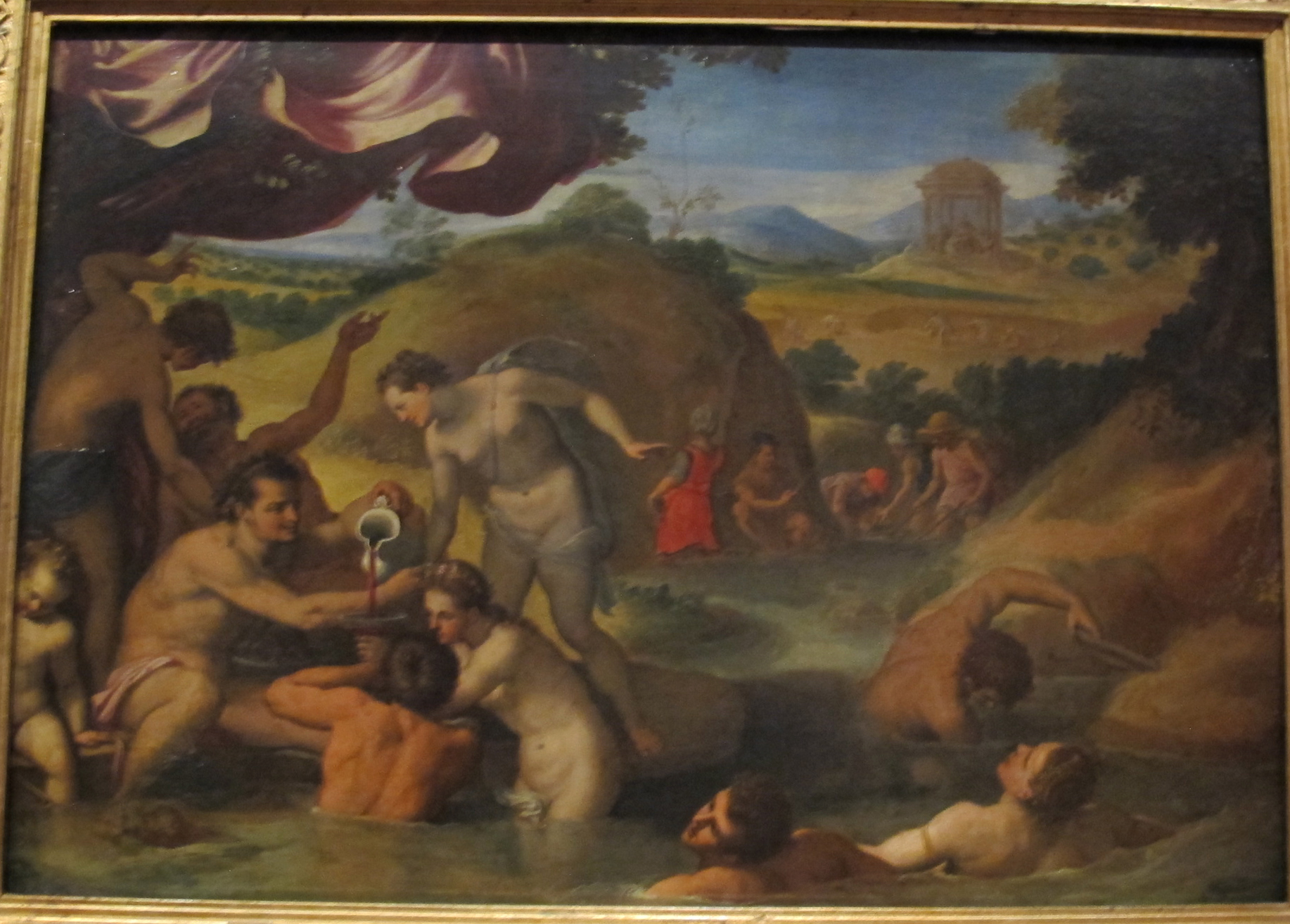
Allegory of the State (Pushkin Museum)

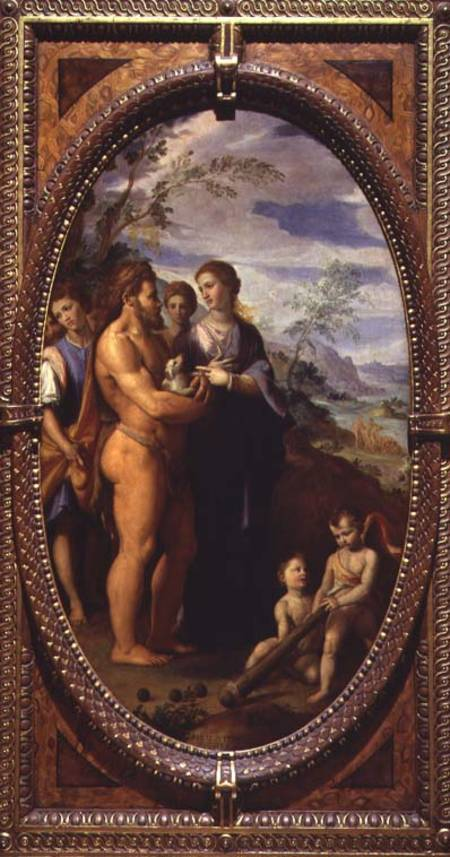
Hercules and Omphalus, Studiolo of Francesco I

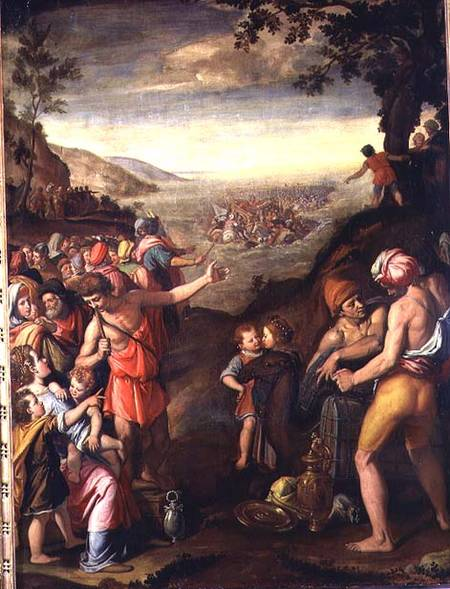
Crossing Red Sea, Studiolo of Francesco I

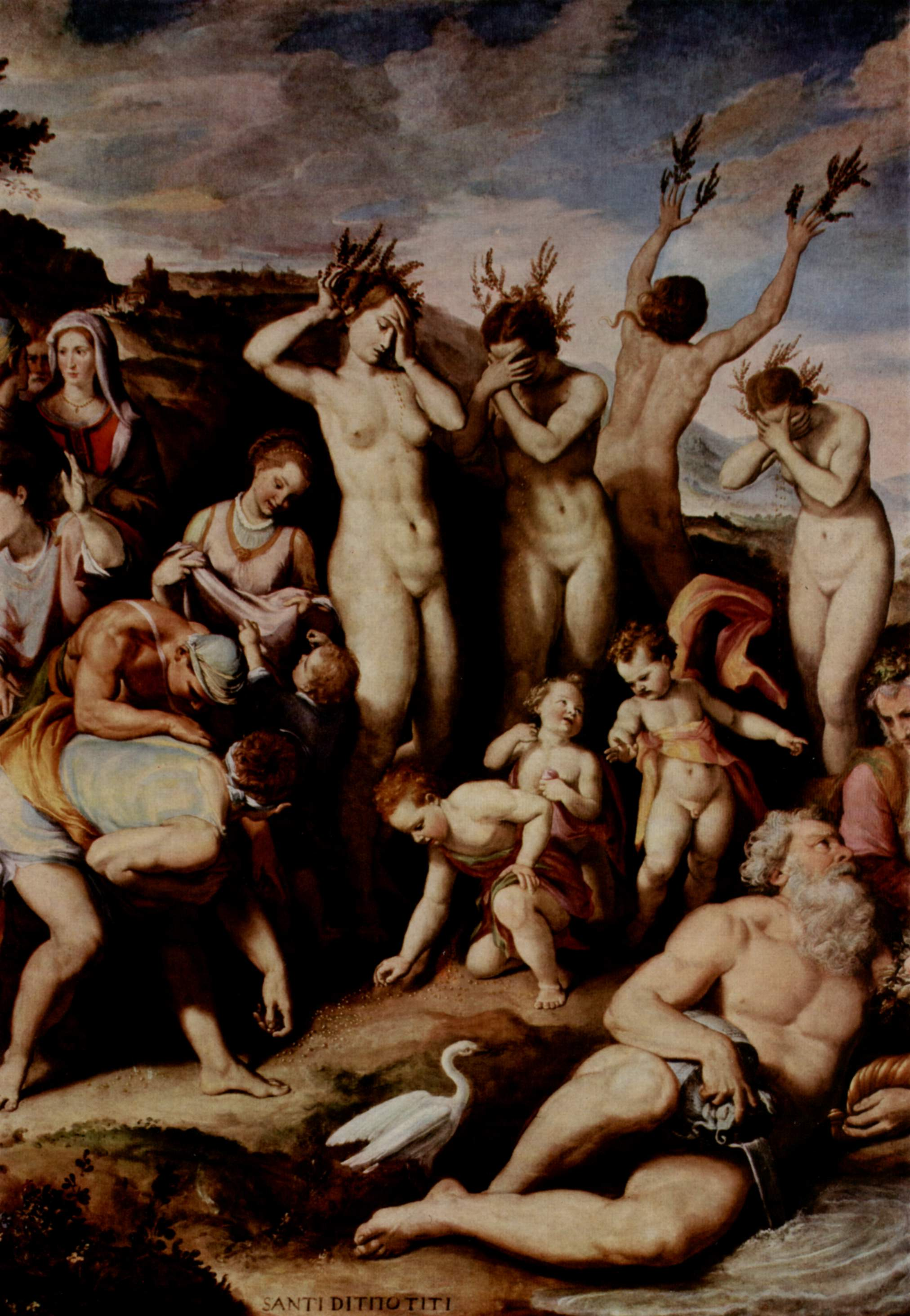
Sisters of Phaeton, Studiolo of Francesco I

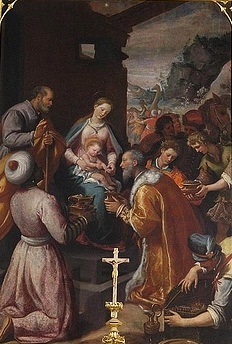
Adoration of Magi, Church of St. Martin in Krzeszowice

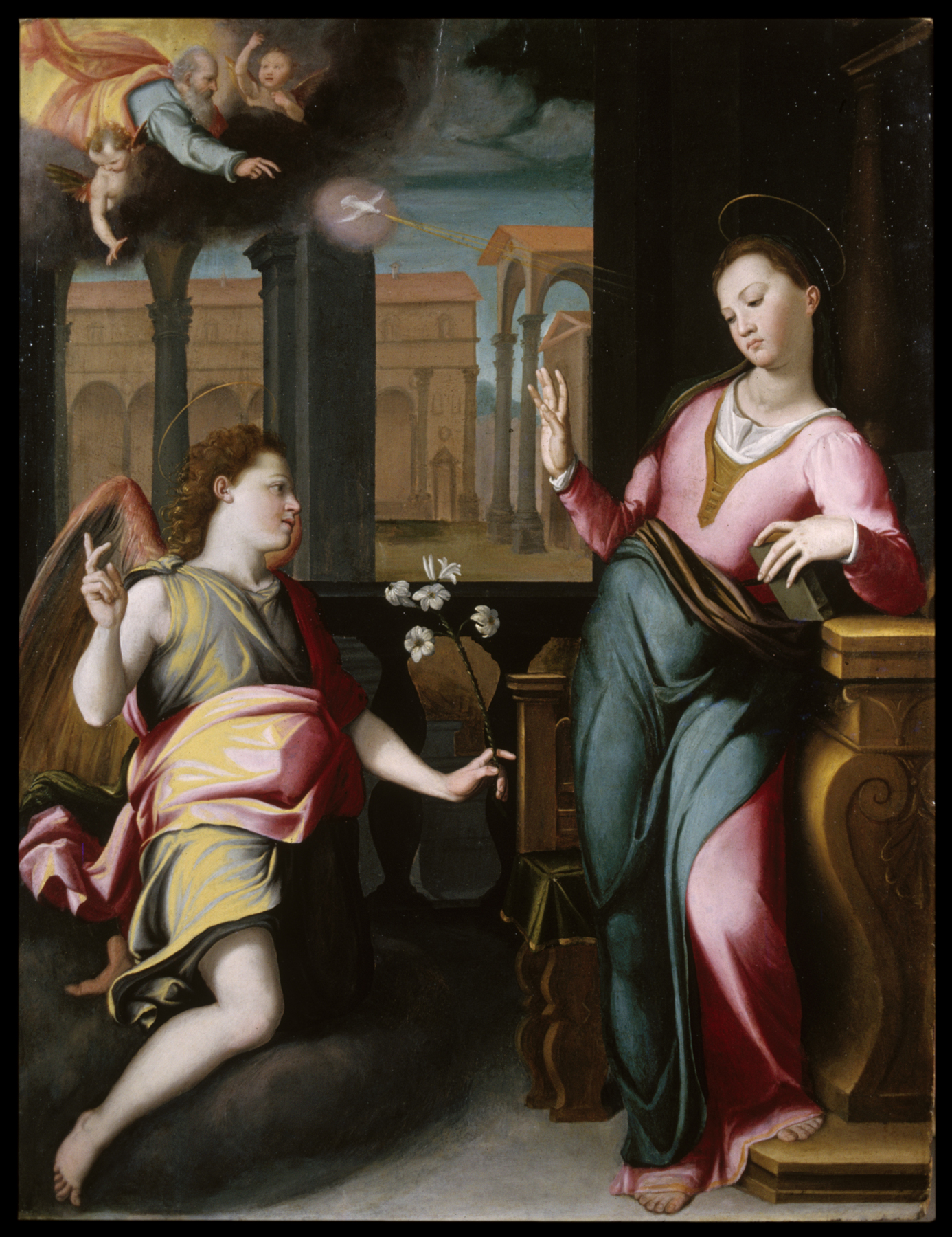
Annunciation

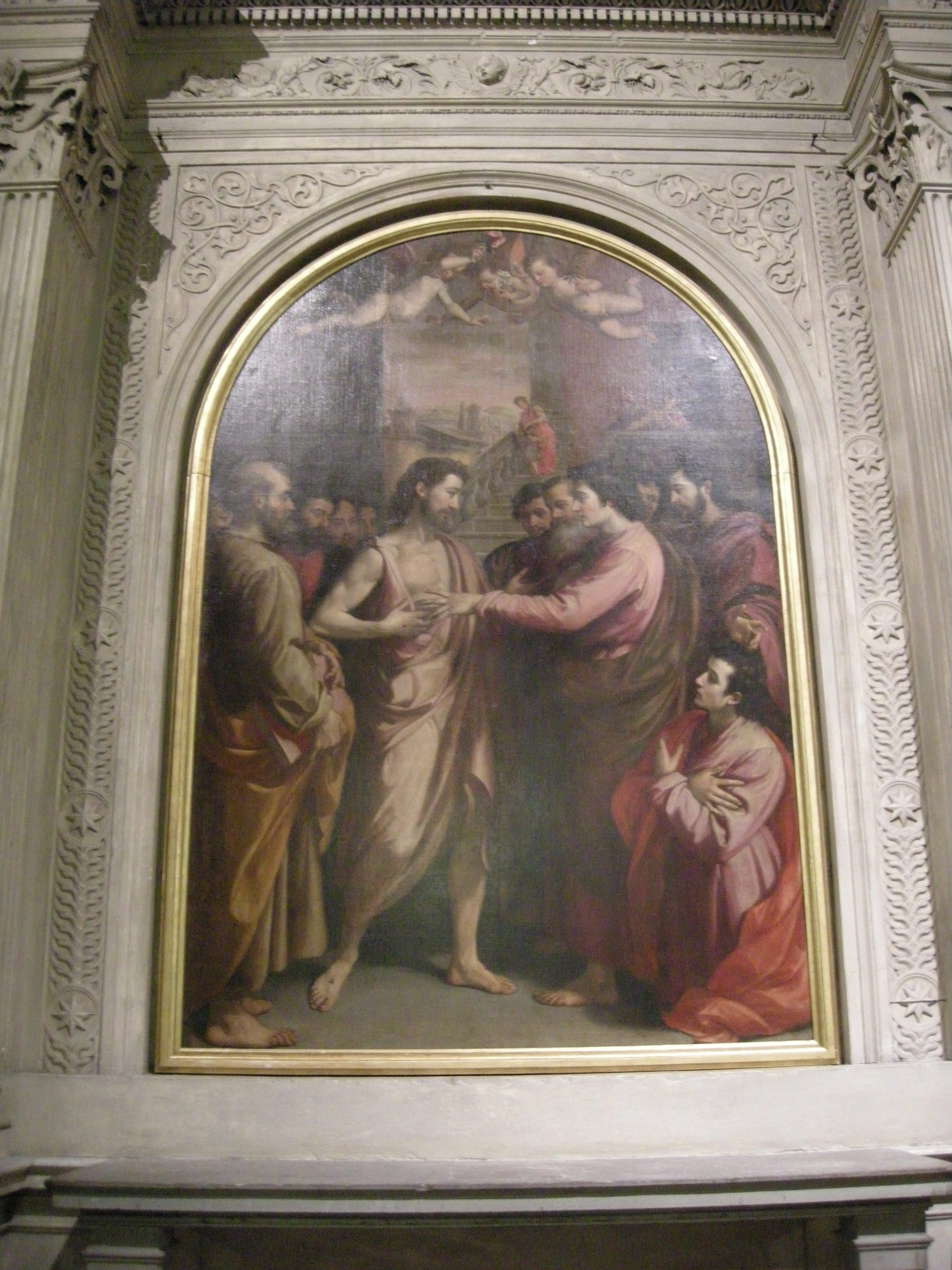
Incredulity of Thomas

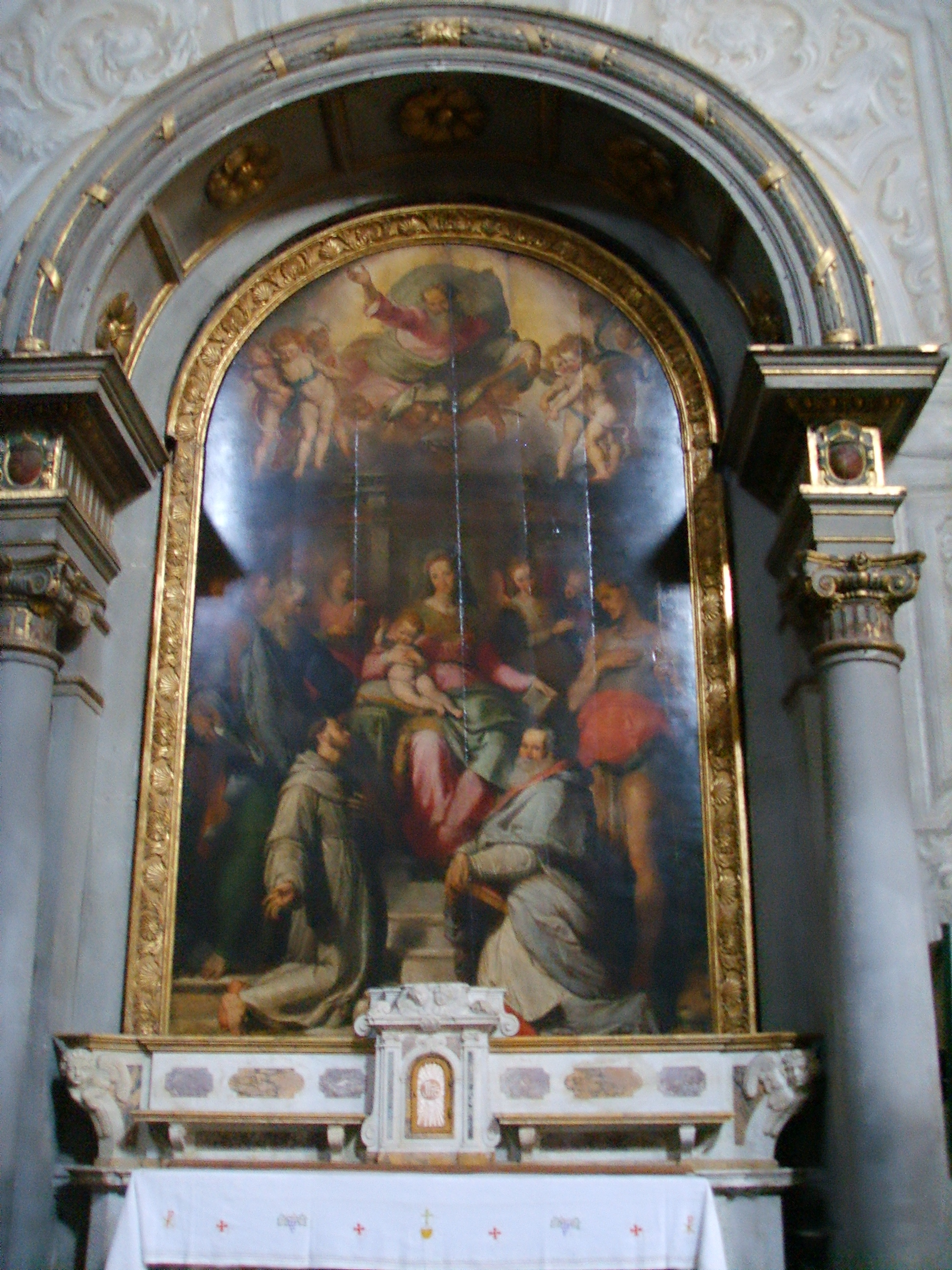
Sacred Conversation (Ognissanti, Florence)

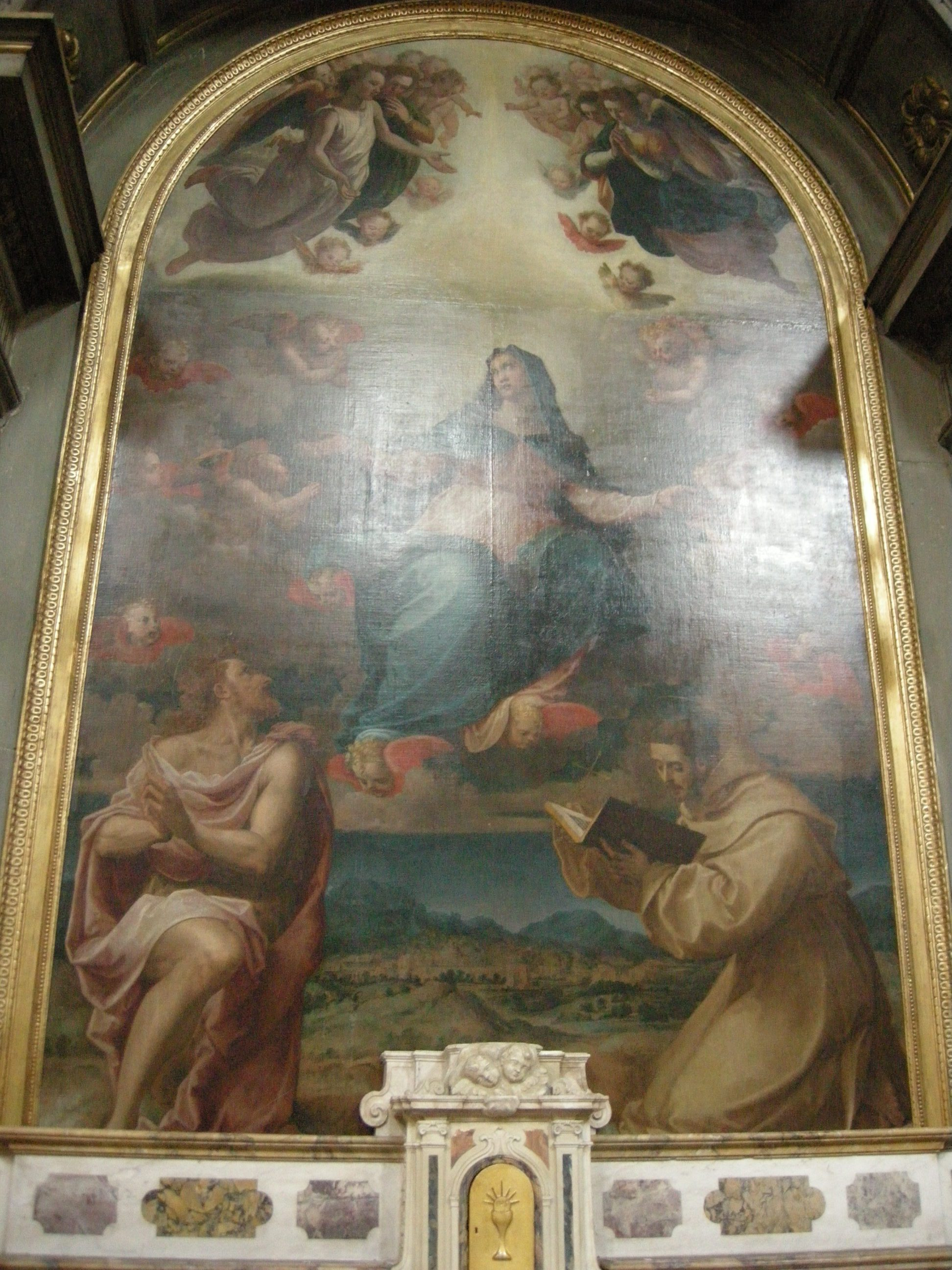
Assumption of Virgin (with Maso da San Friano, in Ognissanti)

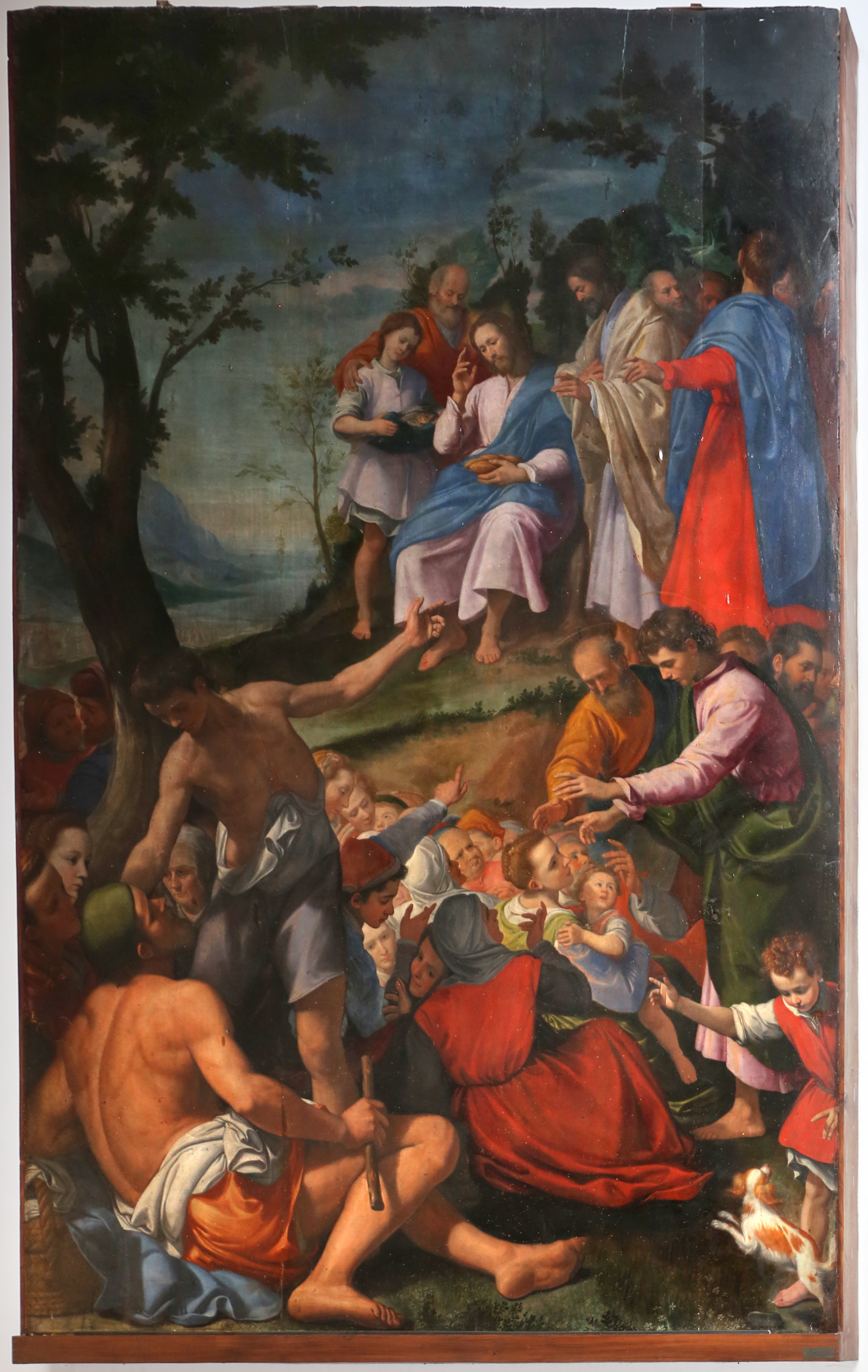
Multiplication of the Loaves and Fishes

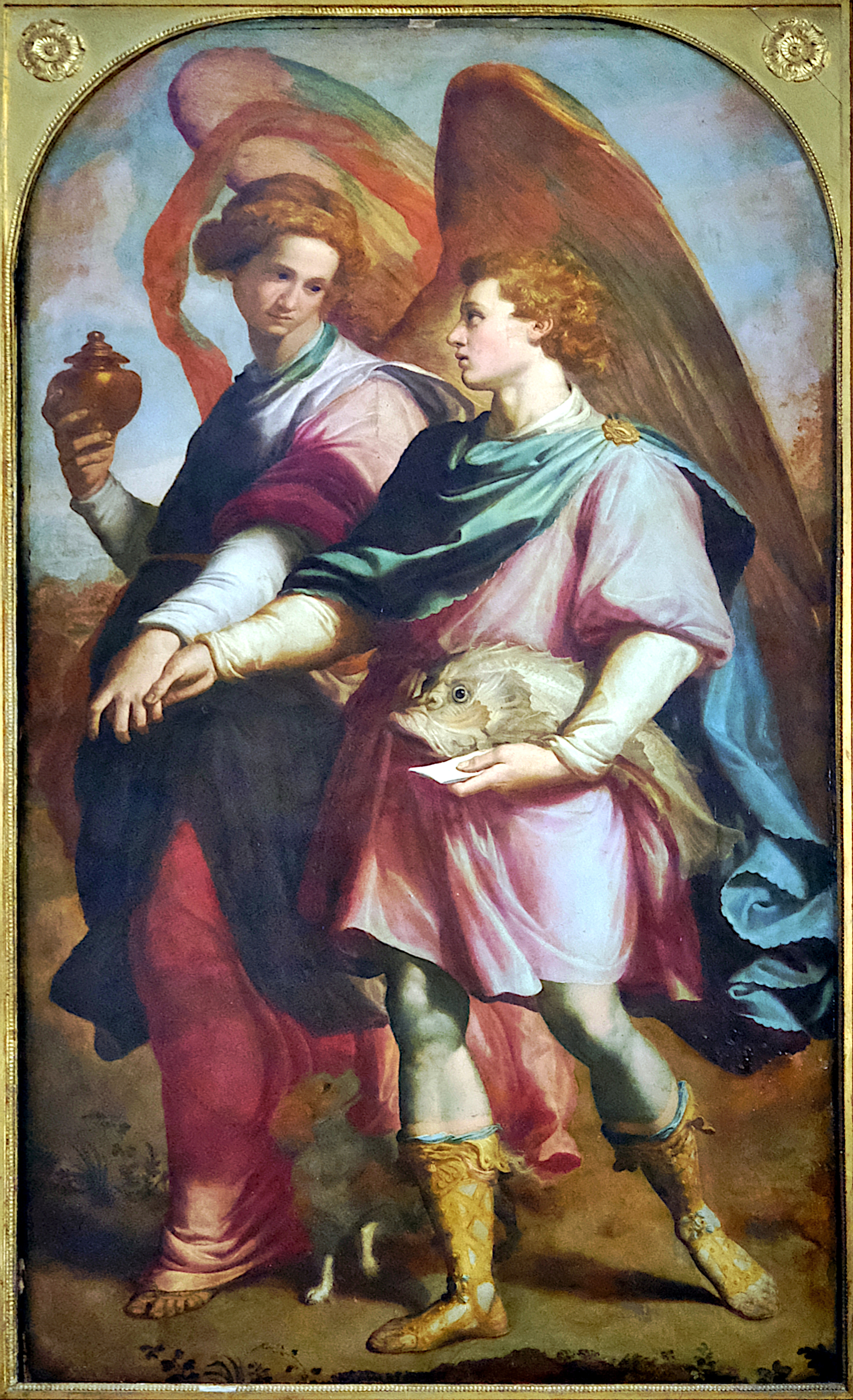
Tobias and the Angel, (Eglise Saint-Eustache, Paris)

Frescoes for Cloister of Santa Maria Novella and Villa il Riposo

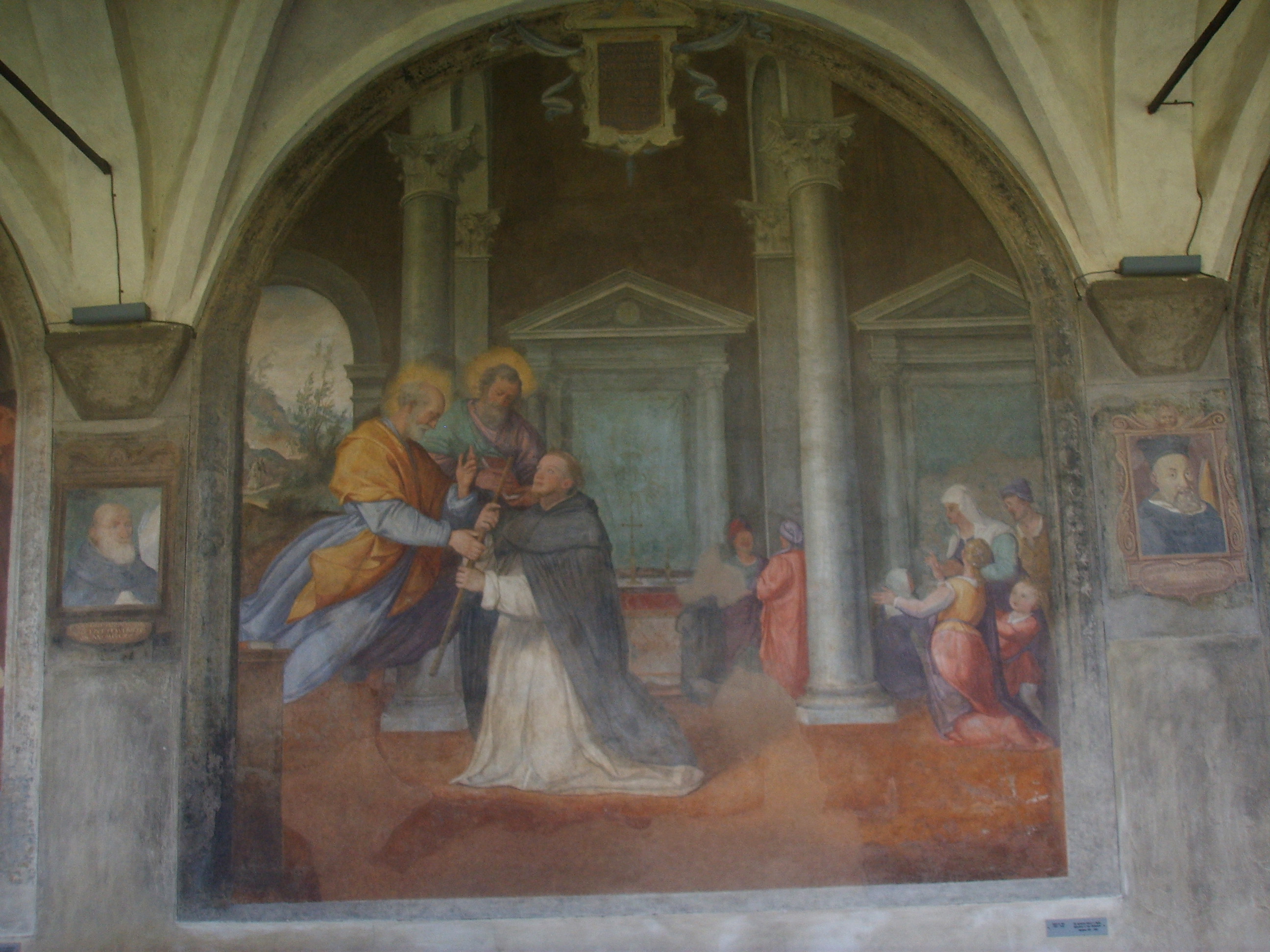
St Dominic's vision of Sts Peter & Paul

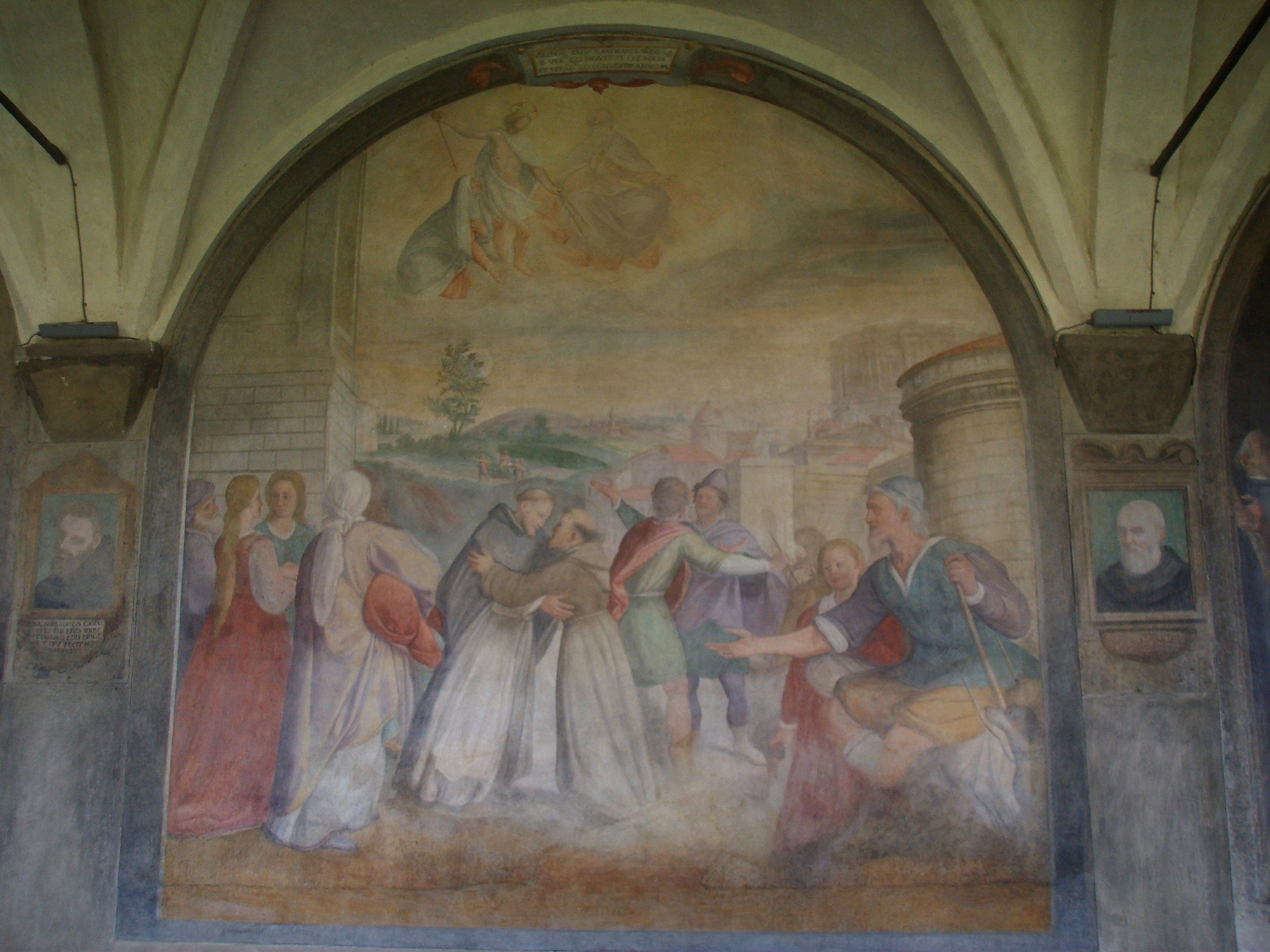
St Dominic and St Francis

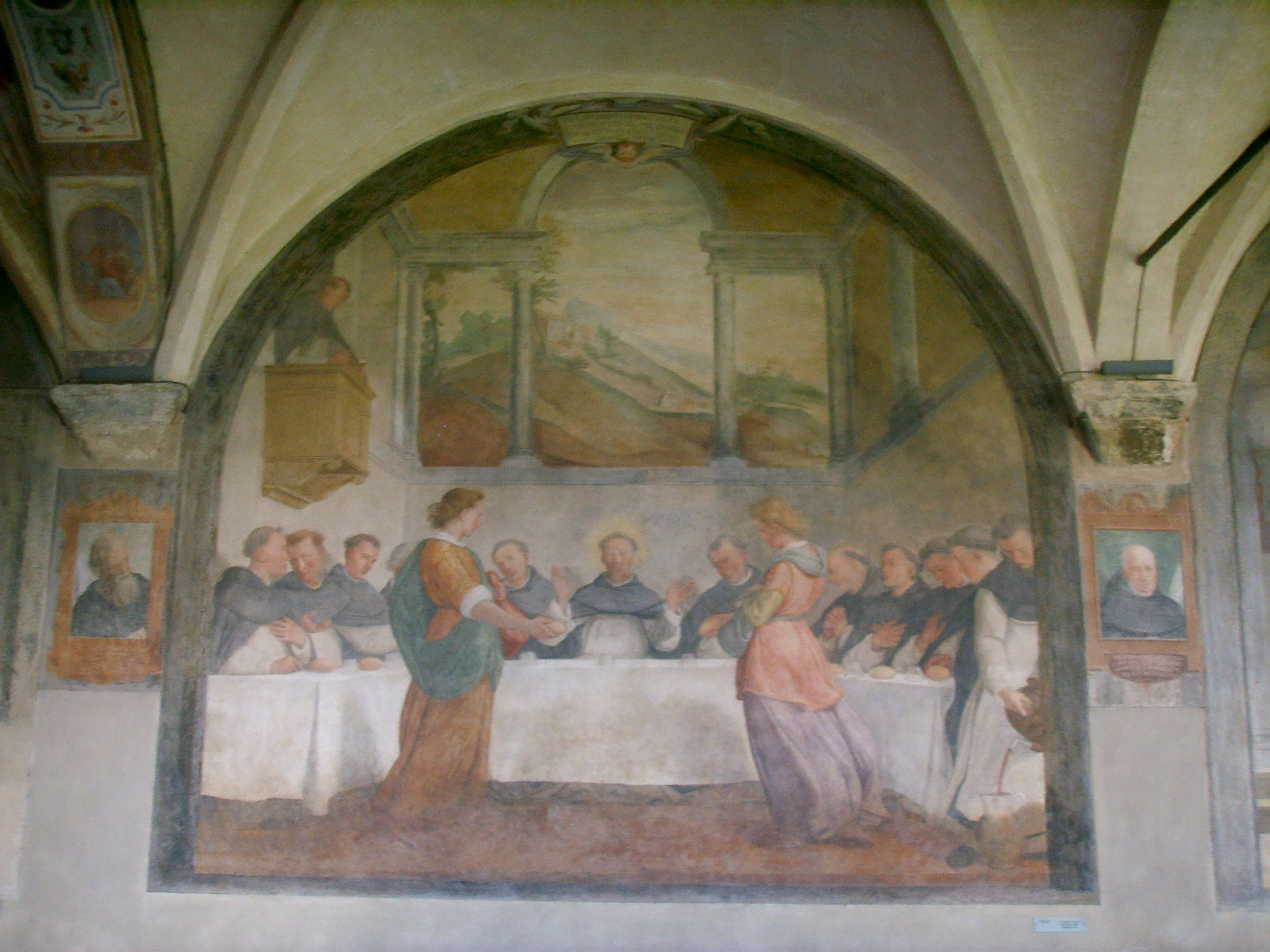
St Dominic dines with Angels

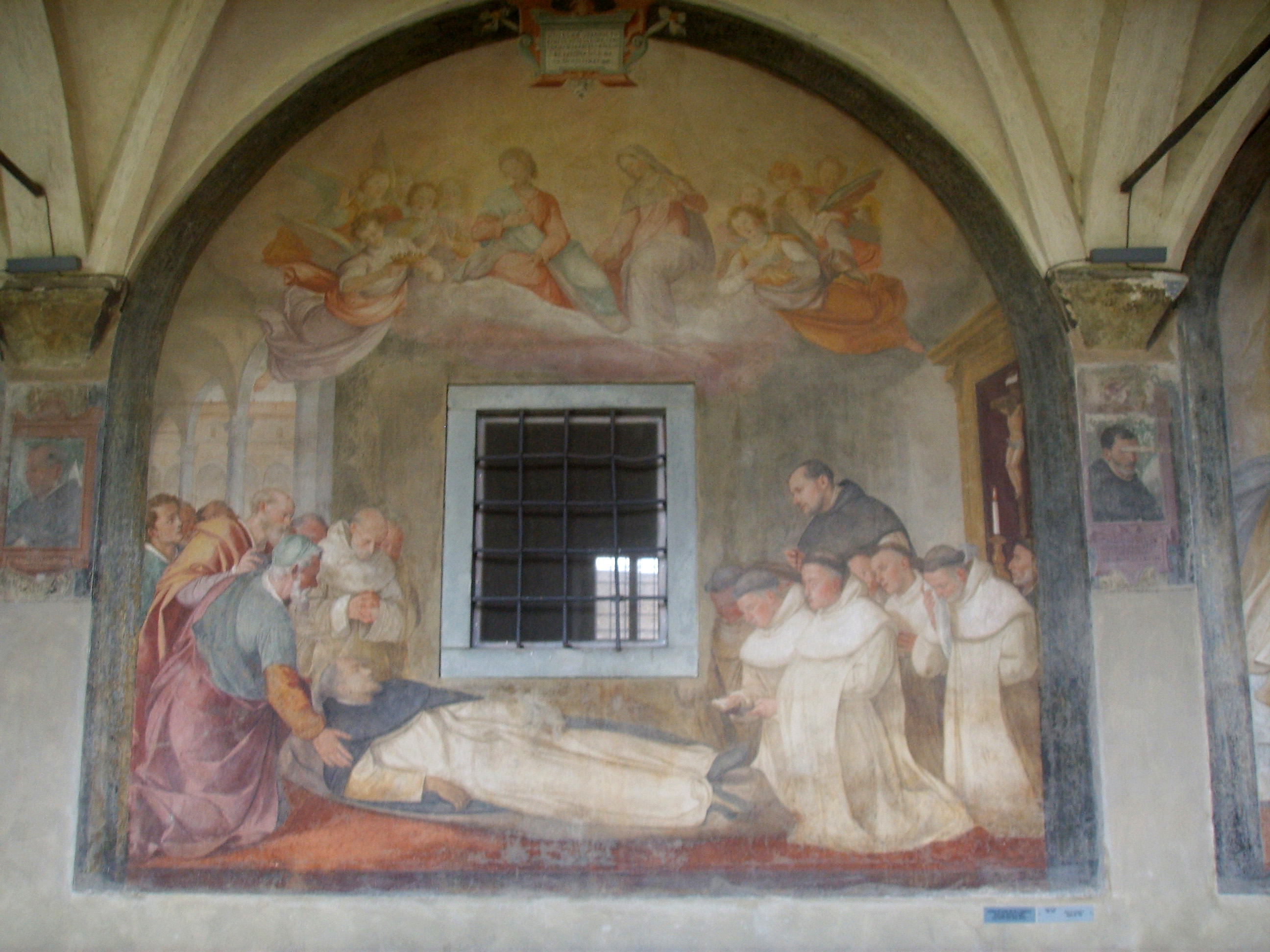
St Dominic's Death

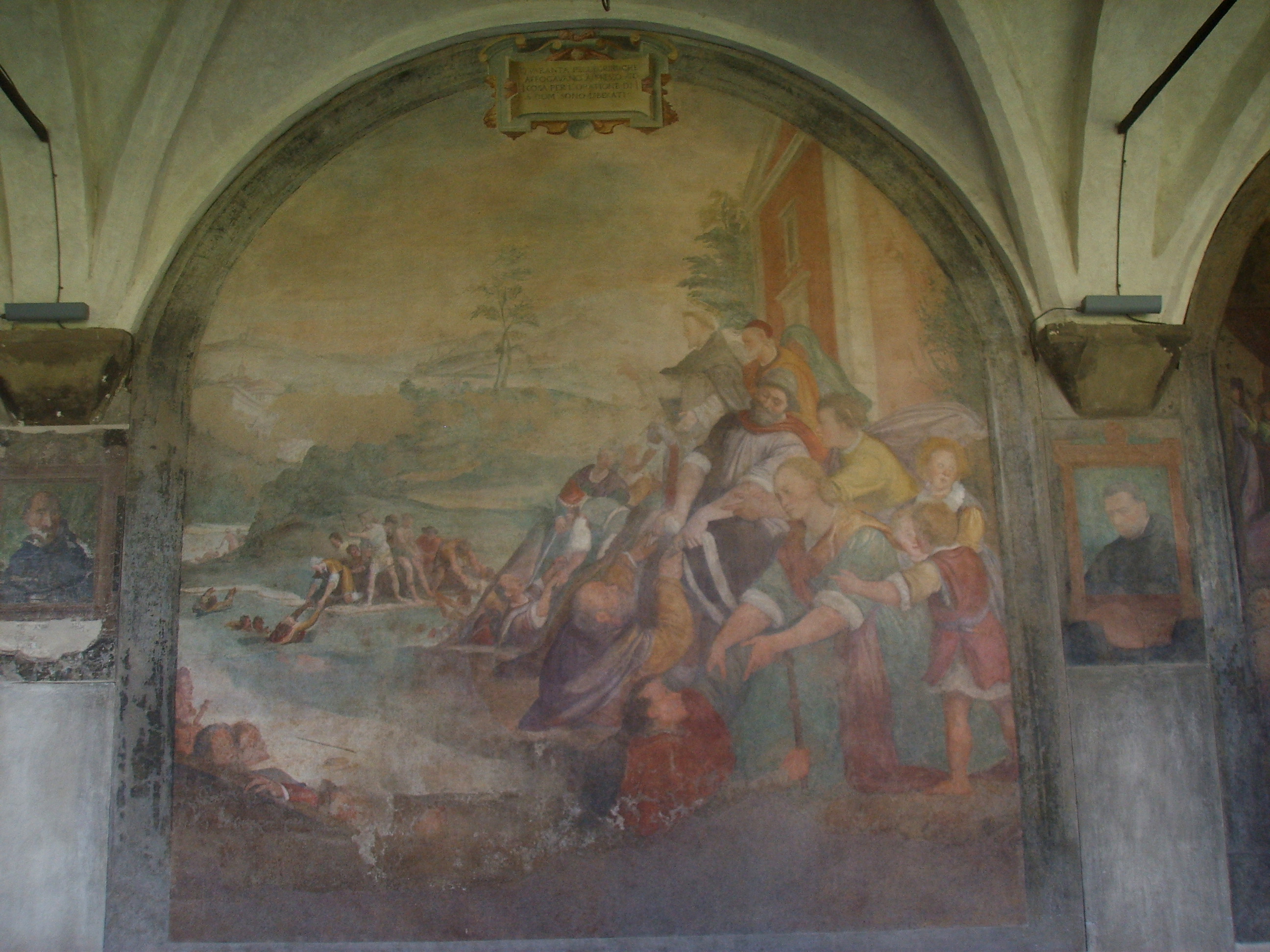
St Dominic Saves Shipwrecked

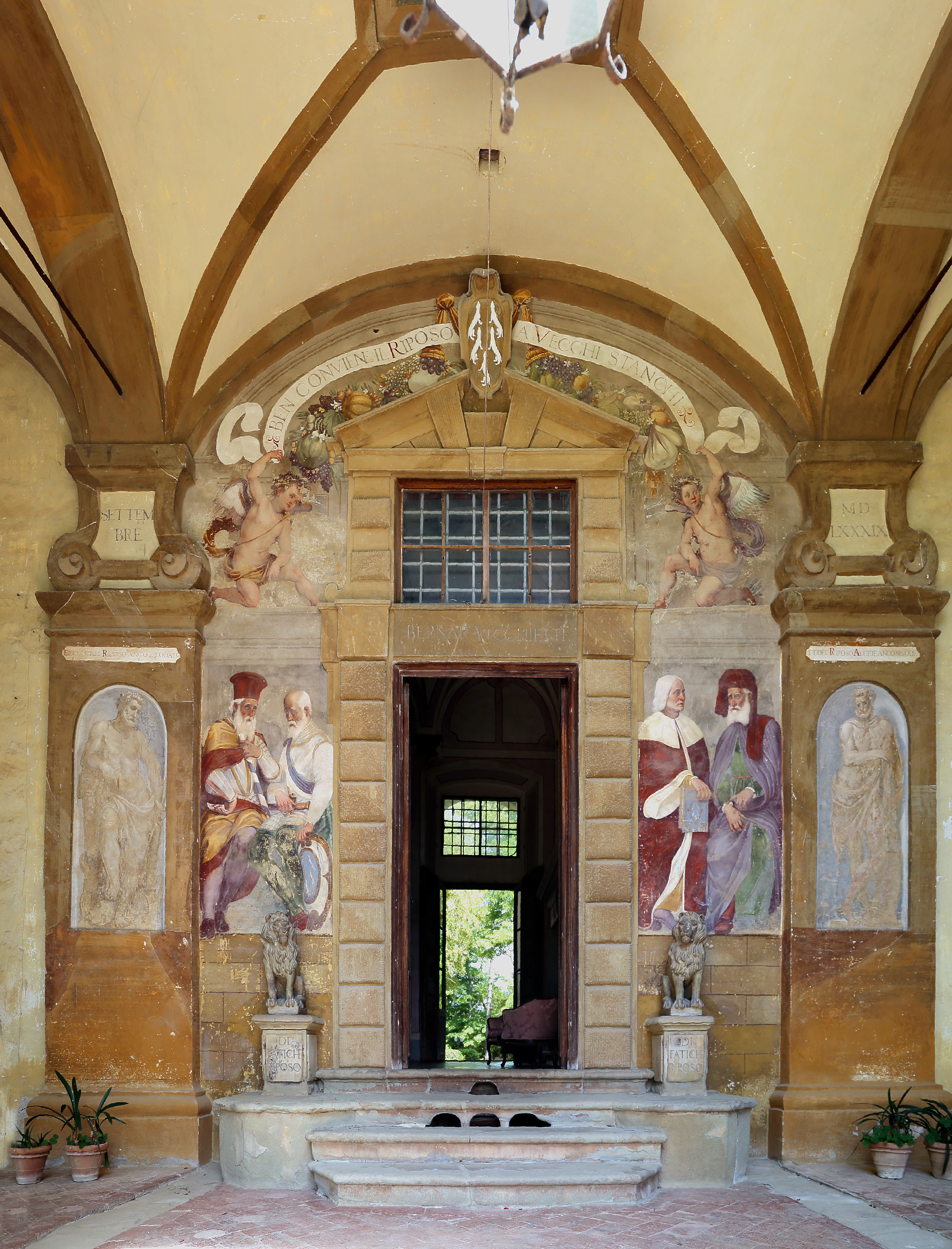
Villa il Riposo
