= San Francesco, Pistoia =

Roman Catholic church in Tuscany, Italy

Coordinates: 43.935244°N 10.912192°E

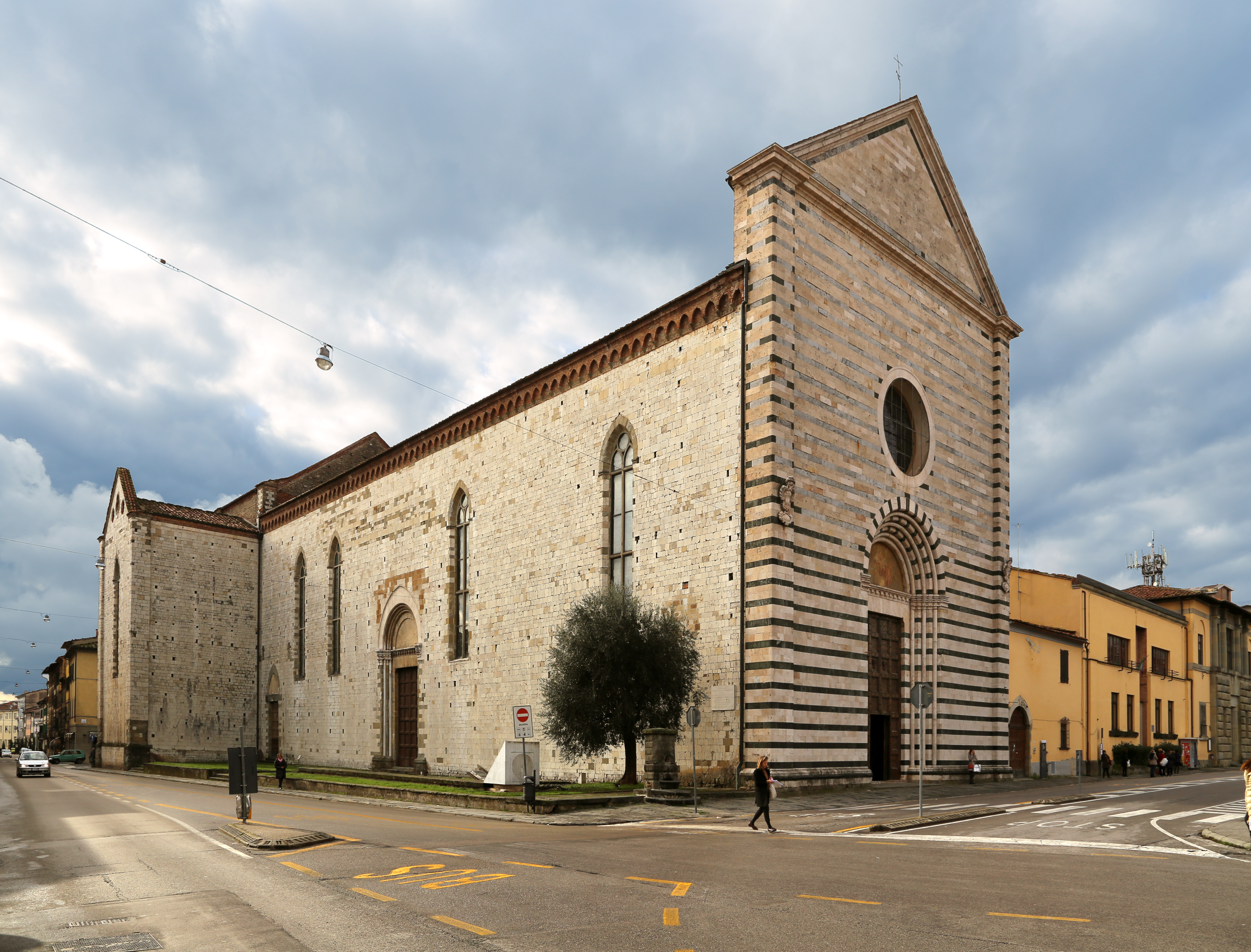
Exterior of church with facade

San Francesco is a Gothic-style, Roman Catholic church located on the piazza of the same name in Pistoia, region of Tuscany, Italy.

== History ==
According to tradition, St Francis had visited Pistoia in 1220. Soon after, a few adherents of St Francis had grouped themselves in a small monastery attached to a small church called Santa Maria del Prato or Santa Maria Maddalena, located at about the location of the present church. The property appears to have been granted to them by the canons of the cathedral. As the monastery grew, a new church, representing the present structure, was begun by 1294, dedicated to the Holy Cross, and manned by the Order of Friars Minor Conventual. While the single nave structure with a number of lateral altars was completed by 1340, modifications and refurbishment proceeded for centuries. The lateral windows are thin and tall. The facade was only added in 1707.

The convent was suppressed in 1808 by the Napoleonic government, but the friars were allowed to return in 1819. In 1866, the monastery was again suppressed, this time by the Italian State and its buildings passed into property to the Commune. In 1926 the convent was again returned to a community of conventual friars. In 2016, the Franciscans ceded the property and church to the Congregation of the Sacred Heart of Jesus of Betharram.

== Description ==
The description of the interiors in 1853 by Tigri, recalls the following interior decoration: To the right of altar from entrance

- 1st altar (Lafri family) had an altarpiece with an Adoration of the Magi by Gismondino Lafri or his son Jacopo.
- 2nd altar (Sozzifanti dal Duomo family) had an altarpiece with an Annuciation by Lazzaro Baldi
- 3rd altar (Carafantoni family) has an altarpiece with a Nativity (1609) by Giuseppe di Silvestro Schiettini
- 4th altar (Sanmarini family) had an altarpiece with an Immaculate Conception attributed to followers of il Poppi
- 5th altar (Arrighi family) had an altarpiece with a Mary at the Temple attributed to il Poppi
- 6th altar (Bracciolini family) had an altarpiece with a Virgin and Saints attributed to school of Andrea del Sarto.

In the presbytery

- 7th altar (Gatteschi family) has an altarpiece with a St Jacob by Pietro Marchesini
- 8th altar (Pazzaglia family) had an altarpiece with a St Anthony of Padua by Francesco Leoncini
- 9th altar (Baron Bracciolìni and main chapel) had frescoes depicting Life of St Francis attributed to Lippo Memmi or Margaritone

On the left of the altar

- 10th altar (Fioravanti family) had an altarpiece with a San Giuseppe da Covertino by Francesco Artizzoni
- 11th altar (Visconti family) had an altarpiece with a St Roch and other Saints (1638) by Giacinto Gimignano
- 13th altar (dedicated to Prior Sozzifanti) has an altarpiece with a Resurrection of Lazarus by Bronzino
- 14th altar (Franchini family) had an altarpiece with a Wedding at Canna by Gregorio Pagani and completed by Matteo Rosselli
- 15th altar (Desideri family) had an altarpiece with a St Francis receives stigmata by Giovannone Zeti
- 16th altar (Gallo family) has an altarpiece with a copy of a Virgin by Reni by Elisabetta Sirani
- 17th altar (Bracciolini dalle Api family) has an altarpiece with a Refuge in Egypt by Aurelio Lomi

Other chapels had frescoes by Nanni di Jacopo and Bartolomeo di Giovanni Cristiani, Bonaccorso di Cino and the master of the Bracciolini Chapel. In the chapter hall are 13th-century frescoes attributed to Antonio Vite. A polyptych at this church by Lippo Memmi depicting Virgin between St. Paul, St. John the Baptist, St. James, St. Francis, St. Louis, St. Mary Magdalen, and Santa Chiara was described by Vasari, but is no longer present.

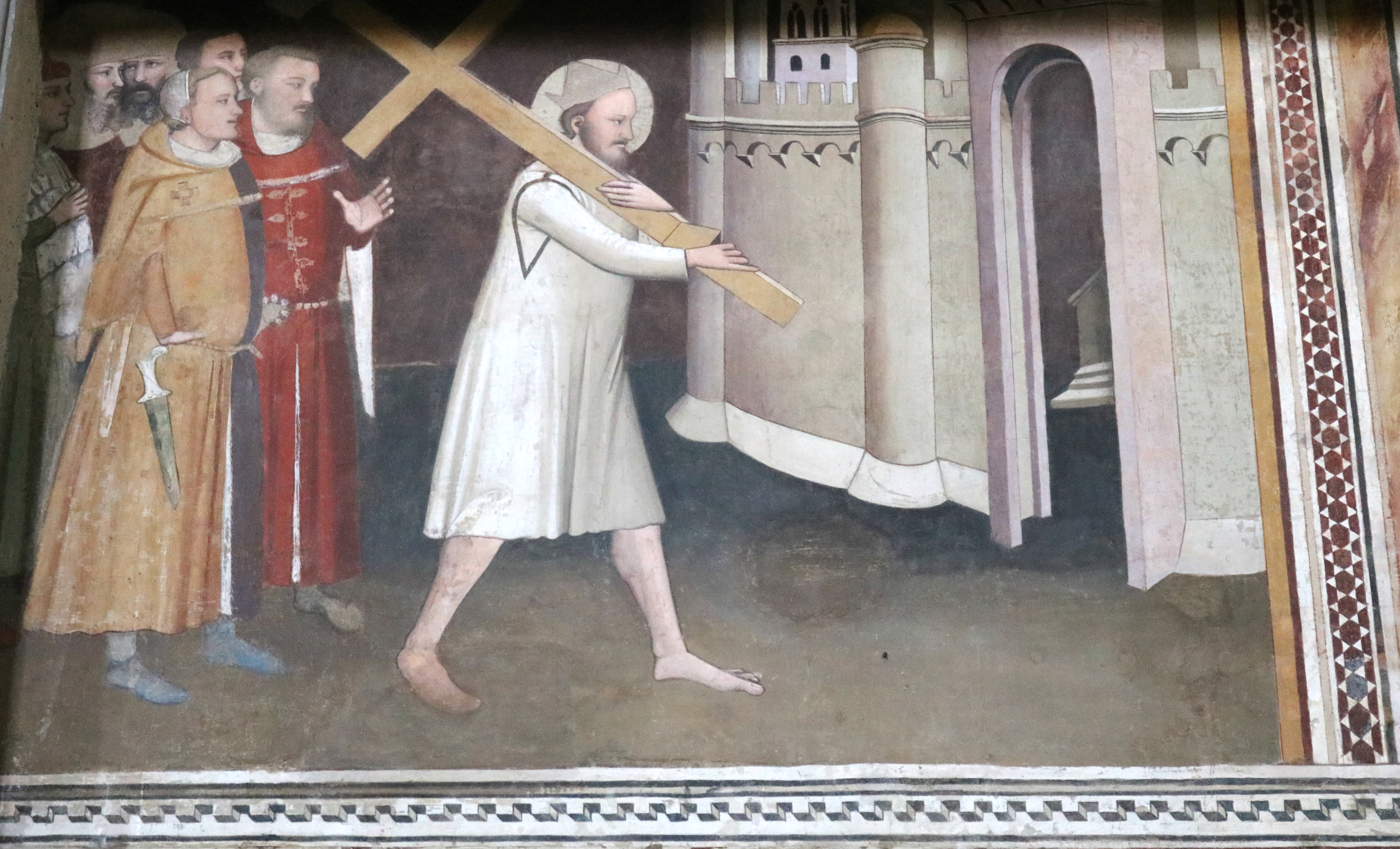
History of the Cross by Bonnaccorso di Cino

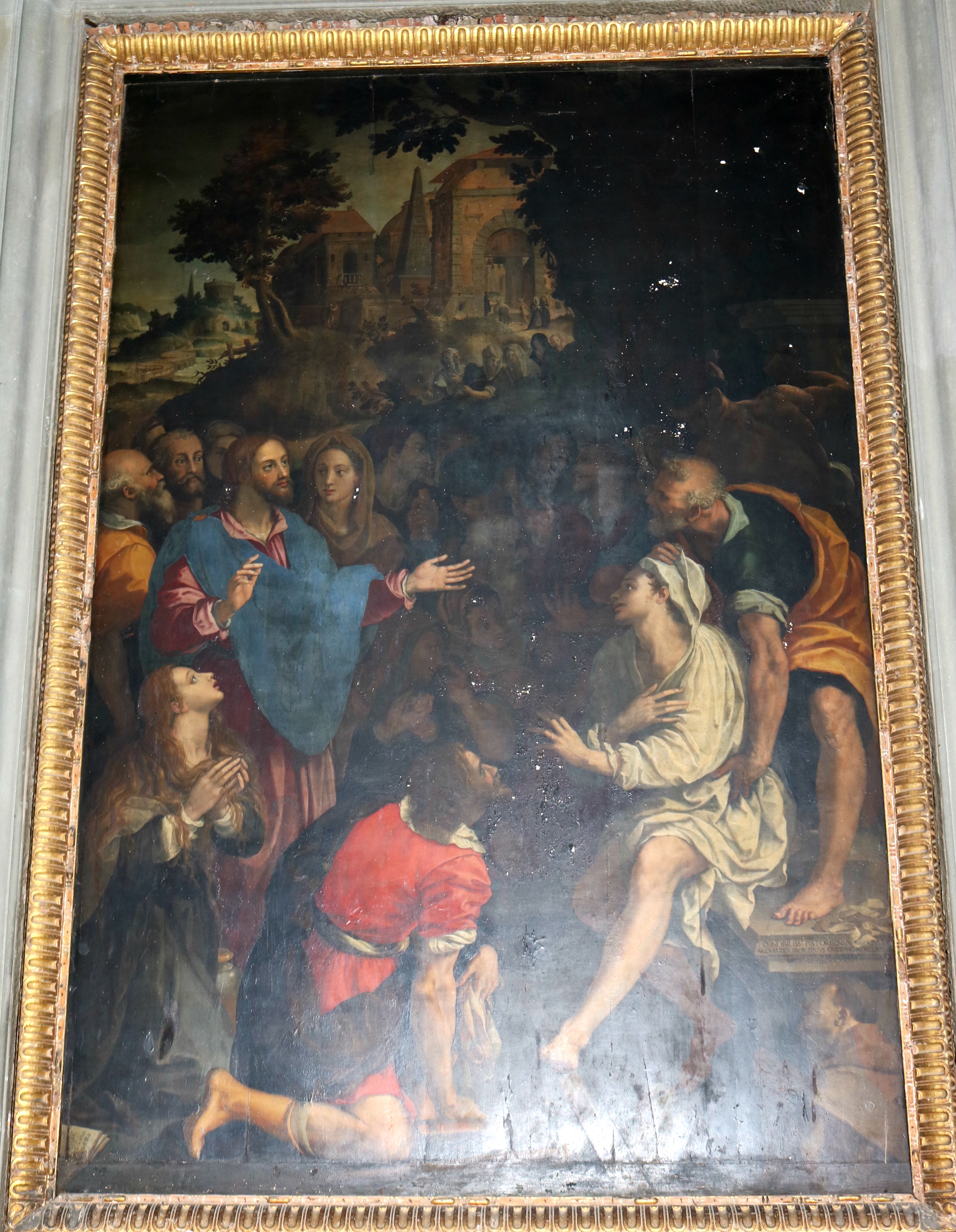
Resurrection of Lazarus by Bronzino

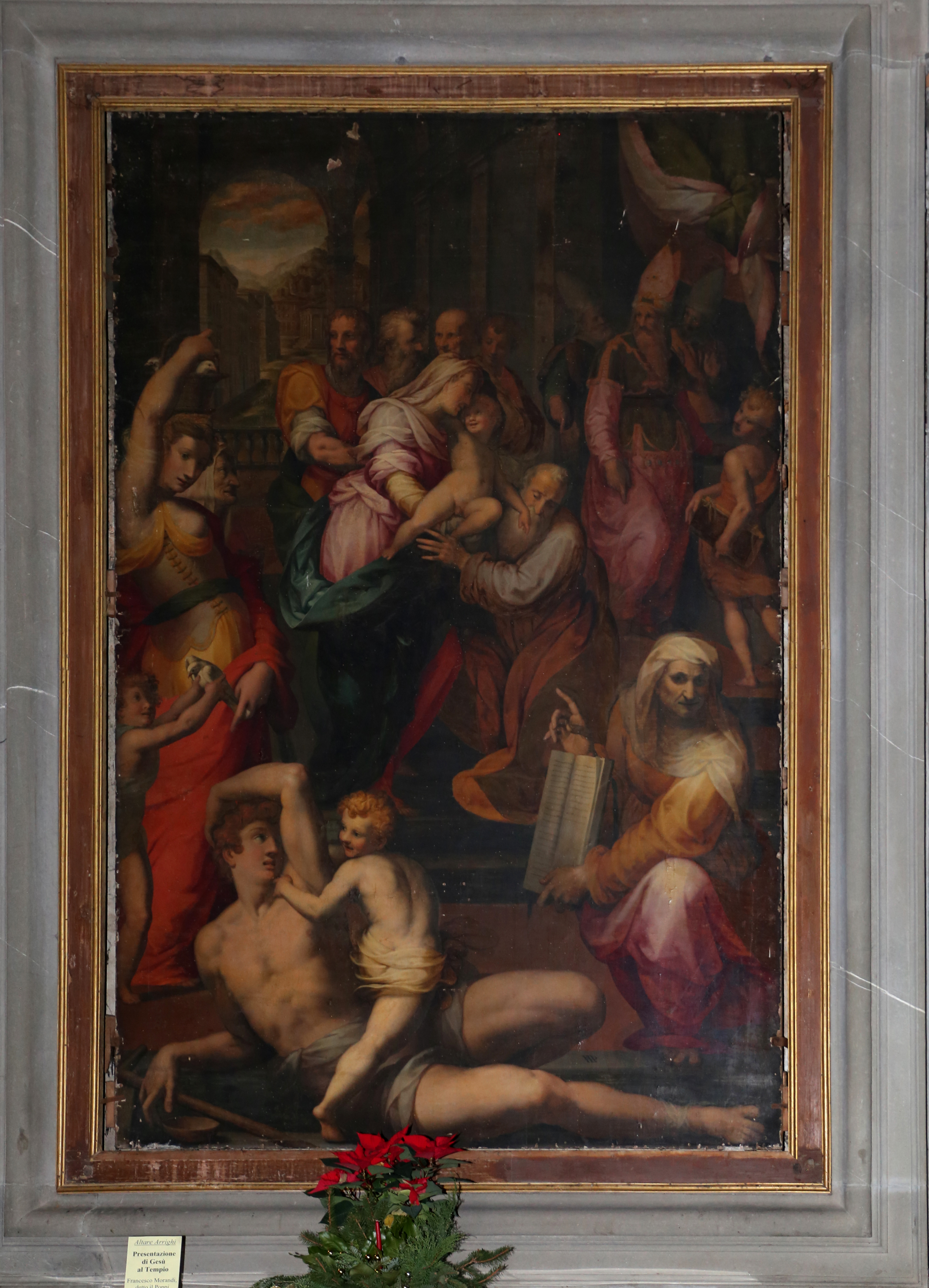
Presentation at Temple by Il Poppi

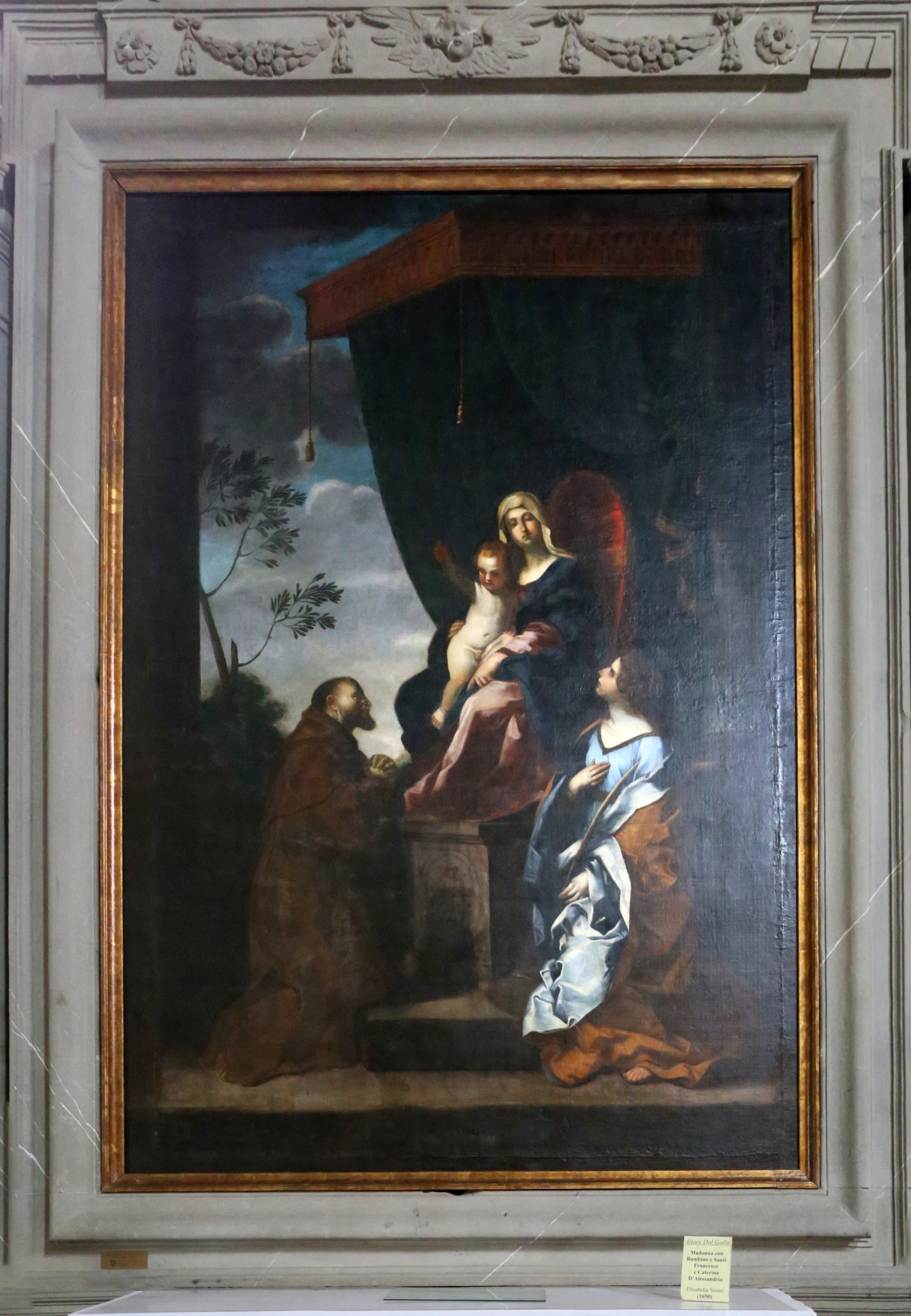
Madonna and child and Saints by Elisabetta Sirani

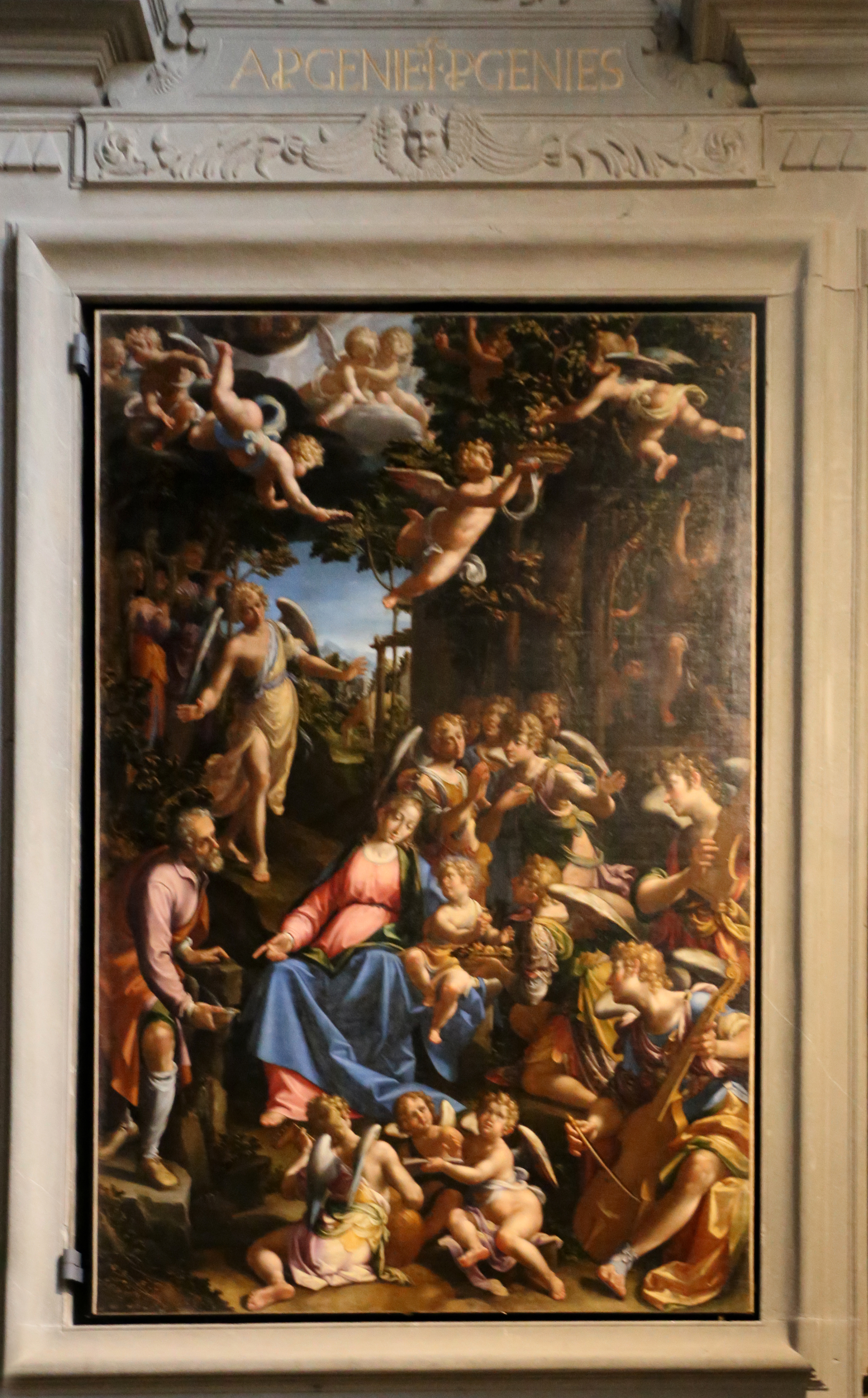
Flight to Egypt by Aurelio Lomi
