= List of Mannerist painters =

This is a list of Mannerist painters.

== A ==
- Hans von Aachen
- Alfonso Aldiverti
- Matteo Perez d'Aleccio
- Alessandro Allori
- Cristofano Allori
- Giovanni Anastasi
- Ippolito Andreasi
- Sofonisba Anguissola
- Vincenzio Ansaloni
- Michelangelo Anselmi
- Cesare Arbasia
- Livio Agresti

== B ==
- Antonio Badile
- Giovanni Balducci
- Camillo Ballini
- Federico Barocci
- Domenico di Pace Beccafumi
- Giovanni Biliverti
- Giovanni Bizzelli
- Ippolito Borghese
- Hieronymus Bosch
- Giovanni Battista Brazzè
- Francesco Brenti
- Hendrick van den Broeck
- Bronzino
- Giulio Bruni
- Giuliano Bugiardini
- Ludovico Buti
- Giovanni Maria Butteri

== C ==
- Denis Calvaert
- Antoine Caron
- Bernardo Castello
- Mirabello Cavalori
- Francesco Cavazzone
- Benvenuto Cellini
- Bernardino Cesari
- Giuseppe Cesari
- Jacopo da Empoli
- Cigoli
- Hendrik de Clerck
- Grazio Cossali
- Baldassare Croce
- Francesco Curradi

== D ==
- Felice Damiani
- Daniele da Volterra
- Niccolò dell'Abbate
- Giovanni Durante

== E ==
- El Greco

== F ==
- Giovanni Antonio Fasolo
- Odoardo Fialetti
- Sebastiano Filippi
- Marcello Fogolino
- Pier Francesco Foschi

== G ==
- Lattanzio Gambara
- Benvenuto Tisi
- Cristofano Gherardi
- Giambologna
- Girolamo da Carpi
- Hendrik Goltzius
- Fermo Guisoni

== I ==
- Girolamo Imparato
- Bernardino India

== K ==
- Julije Klović

== L ==
- Giovanni Antonio Lappoli
- Tommaso Laureti
- Andrea Lilio
- Luca Longhi
- Aurelio Luini

== M ==
- Girolamo Macchietti
- Alessandro Maganza
- Lattanzio Mainardi
- Rutilio di Lorenzo Manetti
- Marco Marchetti
- Pietro Marescalchi
- Donato Mascagni
- Lucio Massari
- Giuseppe Mazzuoli (c. 1536–1589)
- Francesco Menzocchi
- Andrea di Mariotto del Minga
- Francesco Morandini
- Giovanni Battista Moroni
- Raffaellino da Reggio

== N ==
- Giovanni Battista Naldini
- Cesare Nebbia
- Nosadella
- Carlo Francesco Nuvolone
- Panfilo Nuvolone

== O ==
- Lelio Orsi

== P ==
- Benedetto Pagni
- Parmigianino
- Bartolomeo Passarotti
- Domenico Passignano
- Simone Peterzano
- Bernardino Poccetti
- Jacopo Pontormo
- Giuseppe Porta
- Camillo Procaccini
- Carlo Antonio Procaccini

== R ==
- Giacomo Rocca
- Giulio Romano
- Cristoforo Roncalli
- Matteo Rosselli
- Francesco de' Rossi (Il Salviati)
- Rosso Fiorentino

== S ==
- Maso da San Friano
- Scarsellino
- Sebastiano del Piombo
- Il Sodoma
- Jan Soens
- Giacomo Stella
- Stradanus
- Francesco Stringa
- Studiolo of Francois I

== T ==
- Lazzaro Tavarone
- Tintoretto
- Santi di Tito
- Michele Tosini

== V ==
- Francesco Vanni
- Tanzio da Varallo
- Giorgio Vasari
- Otto van Veen
- Marcello Venusti
- Paolo Veronese

== W ==
- Joachim Wtewael

== Z ==
- Giacomo Zanguidi
- Filippo Zaniberti
- Federico Zuccari
- Taddeo Zuccari
- Jacopo Zucchi

== See also ==
- Mannerist artists
- Mannerist paintings
- Mannerism artists and their masterpieces (written in Japanese)
