= Studiolo of Francesco I =

Room in the Palazzo Vecchio, Florence

Coordinates: 43°46′8.86″N 11°15′23.59″E

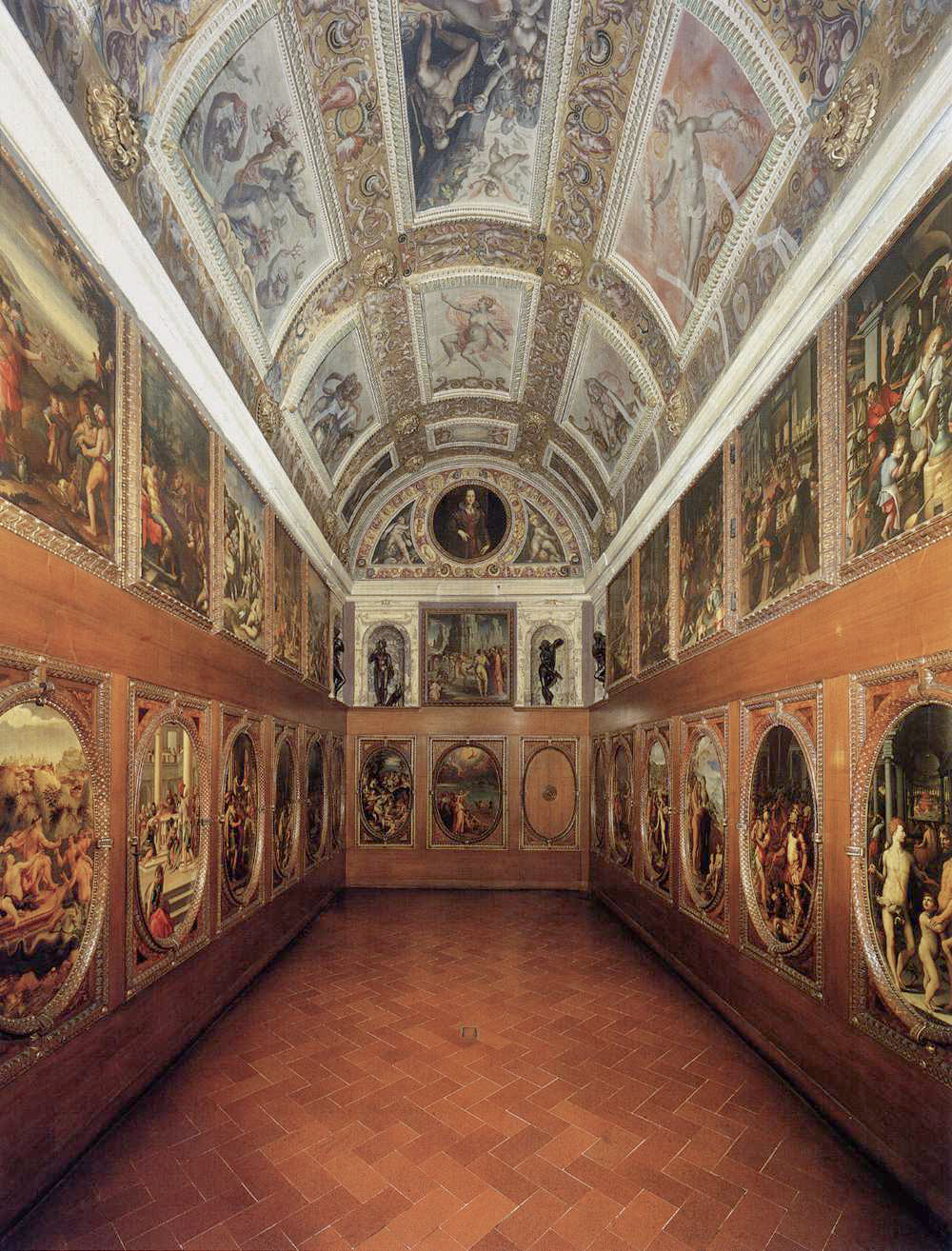
Studiolo of Francesco I

The Studiolo is a small painting-encrusted barrel-vaulted room in the Palazzo Vecchio, Florence, Italy. It was commissioned by Francesco I de' Medici, Grand Duke of Tuscany. It was completed for the duke from 1570 to 1572, by teams of artists under the supervision of Giorgio Vasari and the scholars Giovanni Batista Adriani and Vincenzo Borghini.

This small room was part-office, part-laboratory, part-hiding place, and part-cabinet of curiosities. Here the prince tinkered with alchemy and kept his collection of small, precious, unusual or rare objects. The walls and ceiling were decorated with paintings showing a similar variety of subjects, some showing exotic forms of industry and others mythology. The inset paintings are now all that remains in the room of the original contents. They are rather larger than what is normally meant by the term cabinet painting.

The late-Mannerist decorative program of paintings and sculpture was based on items encompassed by the collection. The object collection itself was stored in ~ 20 cabinets. In the center is a fresco of Prometheus receiving jewels from nature, commenting on the interplay of divine, nature, and humanity, that is the goal of both artistic and scientific interests.

== Paintings ==
The walls were also covered with 34 paintings representing mythologic or religious subjects, or representing trades. The arrangement was such that paintings were somehow related to their neighbors, and emblematic of the objects in the cabinets below. The arrangement we see today is somewhat speculative; and the relationships are not always clear. For example, Tommaso d'Antonio Manzuoli's Diamond Mines hangs above Maso de Sanfriano's Fall of Icarus. The painting by Giovanni Battista Naldini of the House of the Dreams emphasized the relationship with the adjacent bedroom of the Prince. In addition, originally a portrait of Francesco's mother, Eleonora of Toledo by Bronzino, kept vigil.

While the Studiolo employed many of the best of contemporary Florentine painters, their work in this room, for most, does not represent their best efforts. The room itself is now more interesting as an example of an introverted and eccentric monarch; from an artistic viewpoint, the style of these paintings is the high point of Florentine Mannerism, as reflected in the affected and contorted crowds in the canvases. The pseudo-allegiance to the sciences coupled with the sense that they illuminated the educated monarch, suggest a prescient hint of the encyclopedic philosophy of Enlightenment. However, Francesco ultimately was a poor representative of the inquisitive mind; at best this room served as a tinkerer's closet, a place for this personally awkward monarch to find seclusion from his wife, family, and court. Not long after the death of the Grand Duke, it was neglected and dismantled by 1590, only to be partially reconstructed in the twentieth century as a Renaissance oddity within the medieval palace. Lacking furniture or a closed door, this reconstruction fails to accurately recreate the claustrophobic feel of the original.

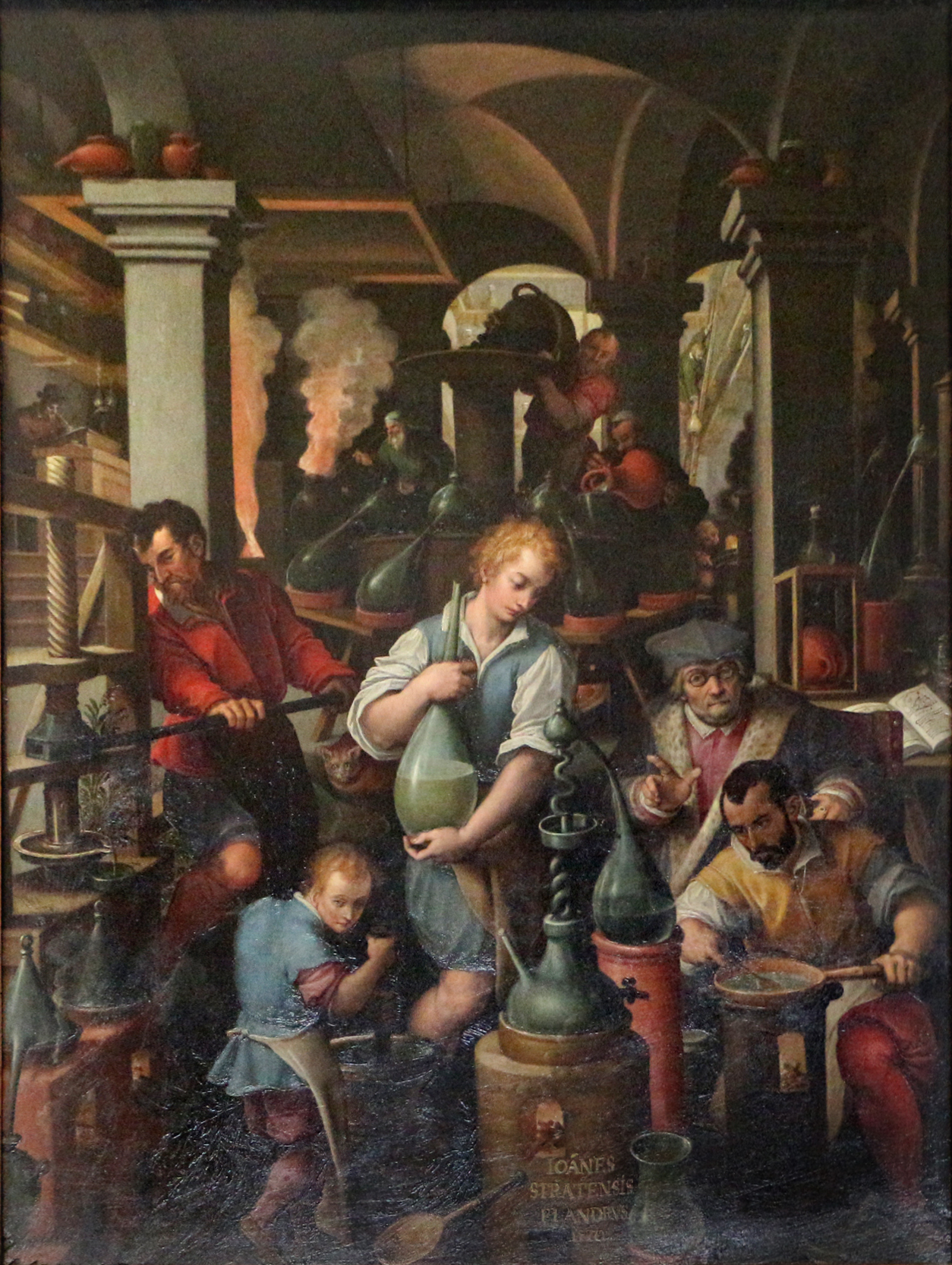
Johannes Stradanus, The Alchemists, c. 1570–73

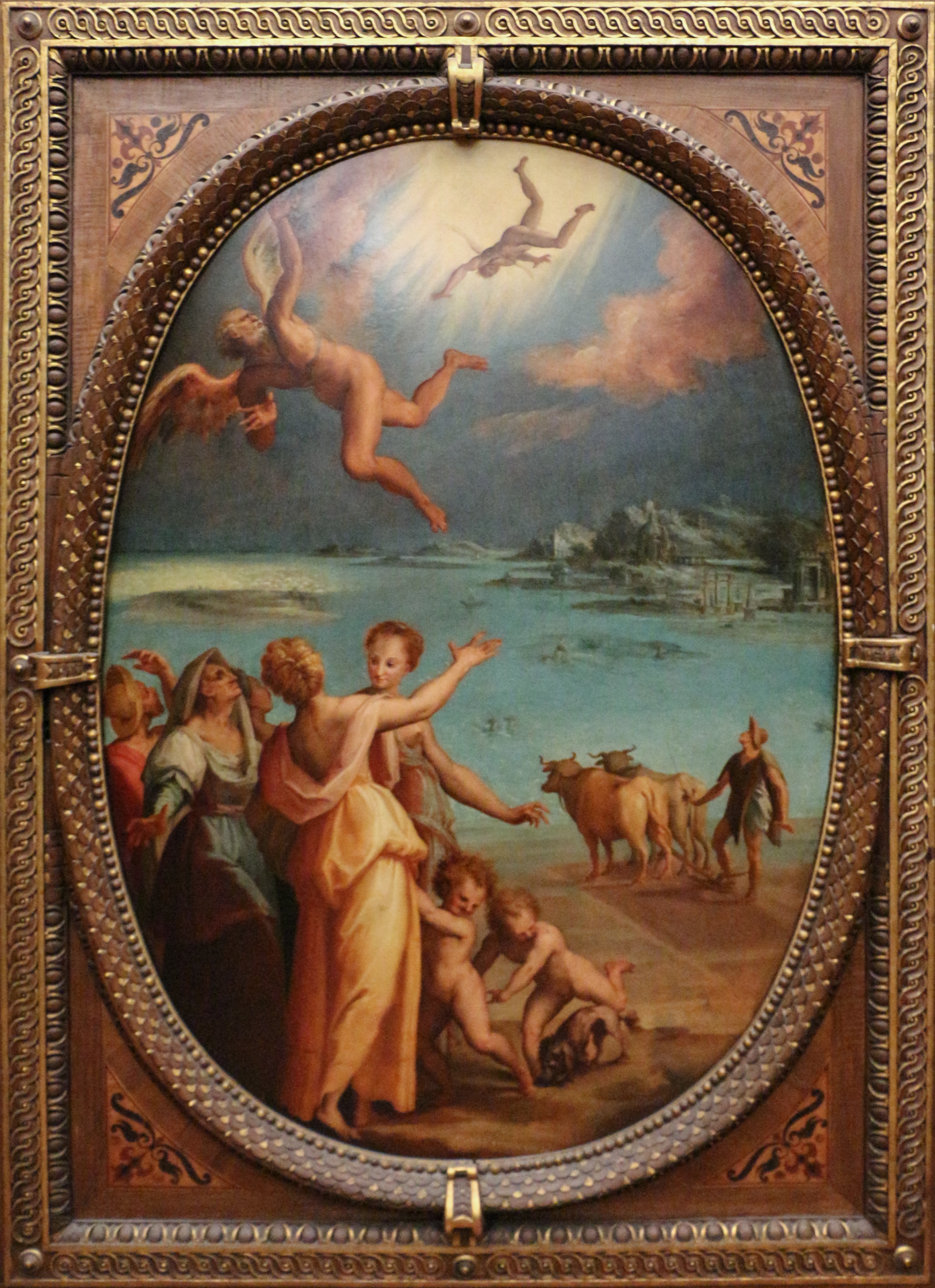
Maso de Sanfriano Fall of Icarus, 1550–73

== Contributing artists to the Studiolo ==
- Alessandro Allori (Pearl Fisherman)
- Bartolomeo Ammannati (Ops)
- Niccolò Betti
- Ludovico Buti (The Armory)
- Giovanni Maria Butteri (Francesco Visiting Glassworks)
- Elia Candido (Aeolus)
- Vittore Casini (The Forge of Vulcan)
- Mirabello Cavalori (Lavinia at the Altar)
- Jacopo Coppi, called "il Meglio" (The Invention of Gunpowder)
- Francesco del Coscia
- Giovanni Fedini
- Alessandro Fei, called "il Barbiere"
- Stoldo Lorenzi (Galatea)
- Sebastiano Marsili
- Girolamo Macchietti (Medea and Jason)
- Andrea del Minga
- Lorenzo dello Sciorino (Hercules and Ladon)
- Francesco Morandini, called "il Poppi", and Jacopo Zucchi (ceiling paintings)
- Giovanni Battista Naldini (Allegory of Dreams, Gathering of Ambergris)
- Carlo Portelli
- Maso da Sanfriano (Flight of Icarus).
- Stradanus (Francesco in his Laboratory)
- Santi di Tito (The Sisters of Phaethon, Hercules and Iole)
- Bartolomeo Traballesi (Danae)
- Lorenzo Vaiani, called "dello Sciorina"
- Giorgio Vasari
- Jacopo Zucchi

== Gallery ==
Statuary Niches and Portraits of Francesco's Parents

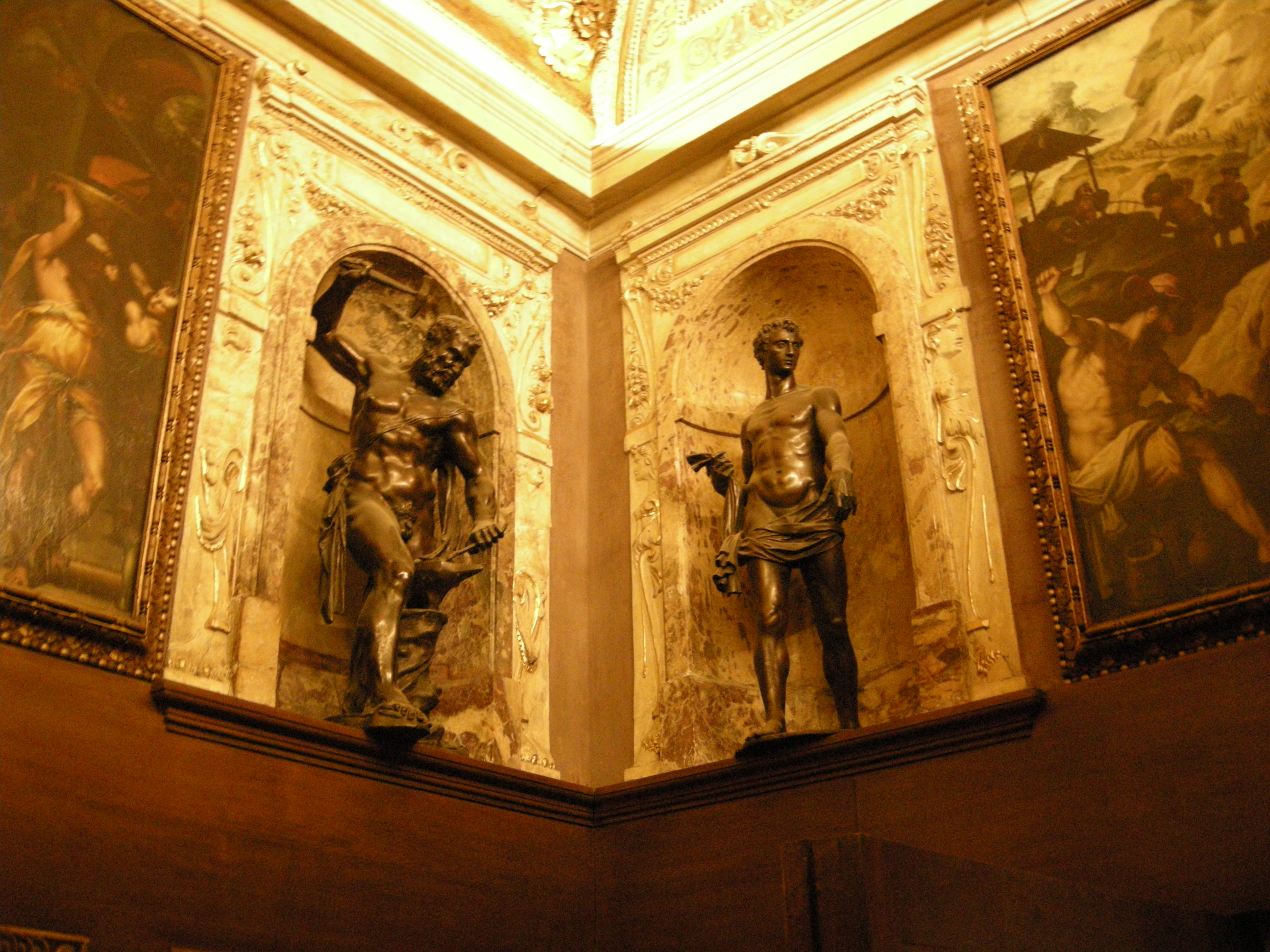

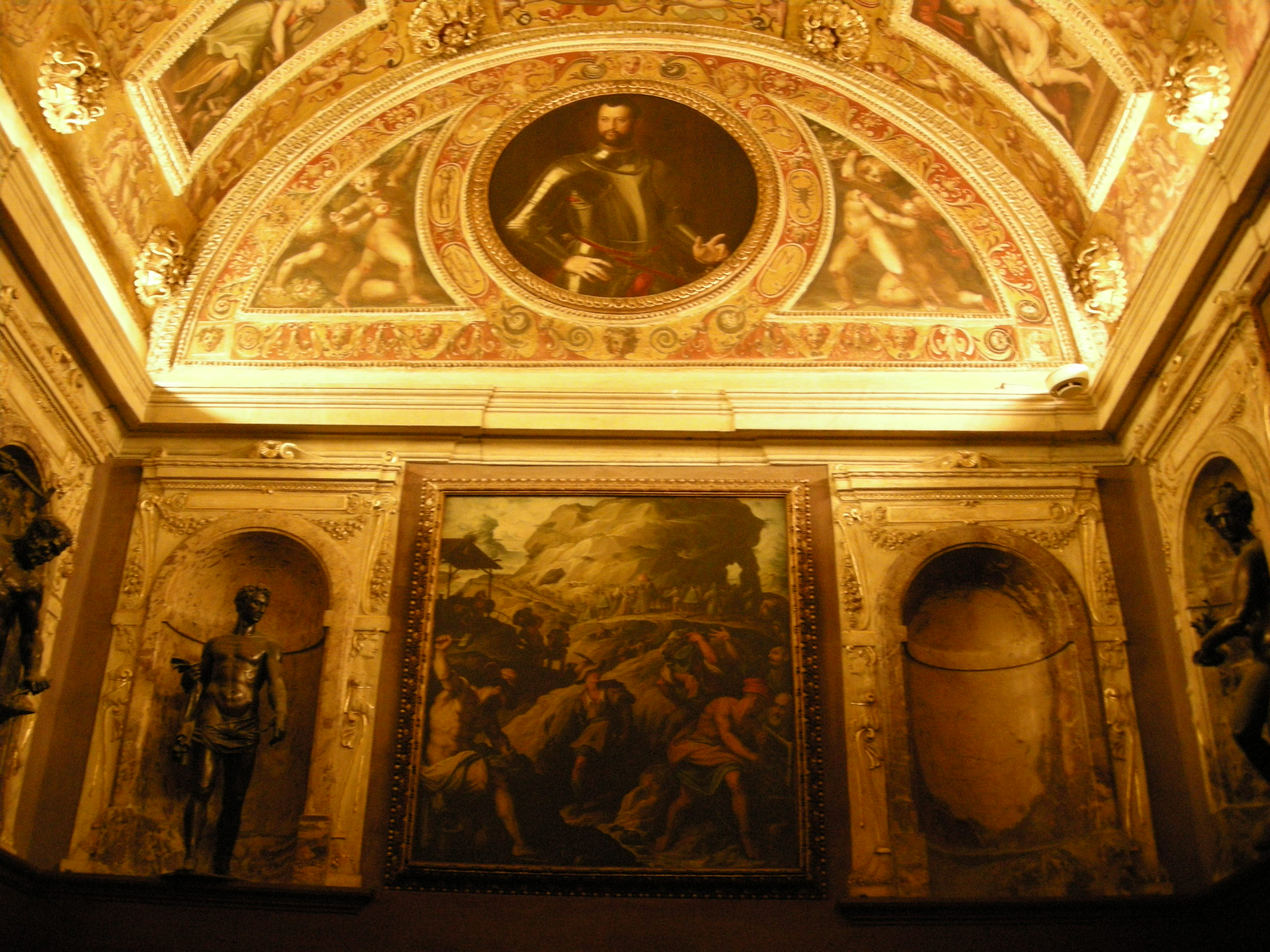
Portrait of Cosimo

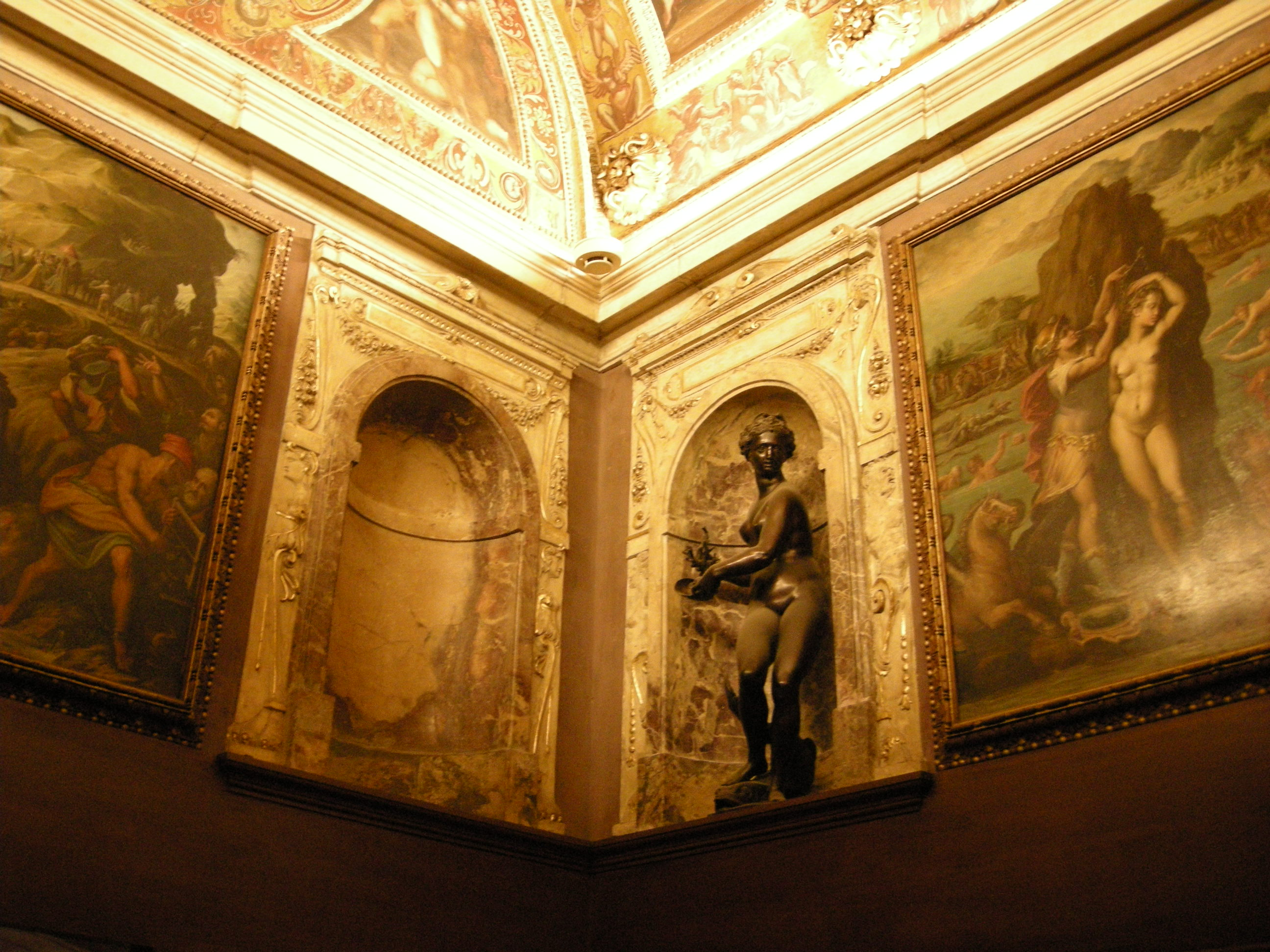
Bronze by Ammanati

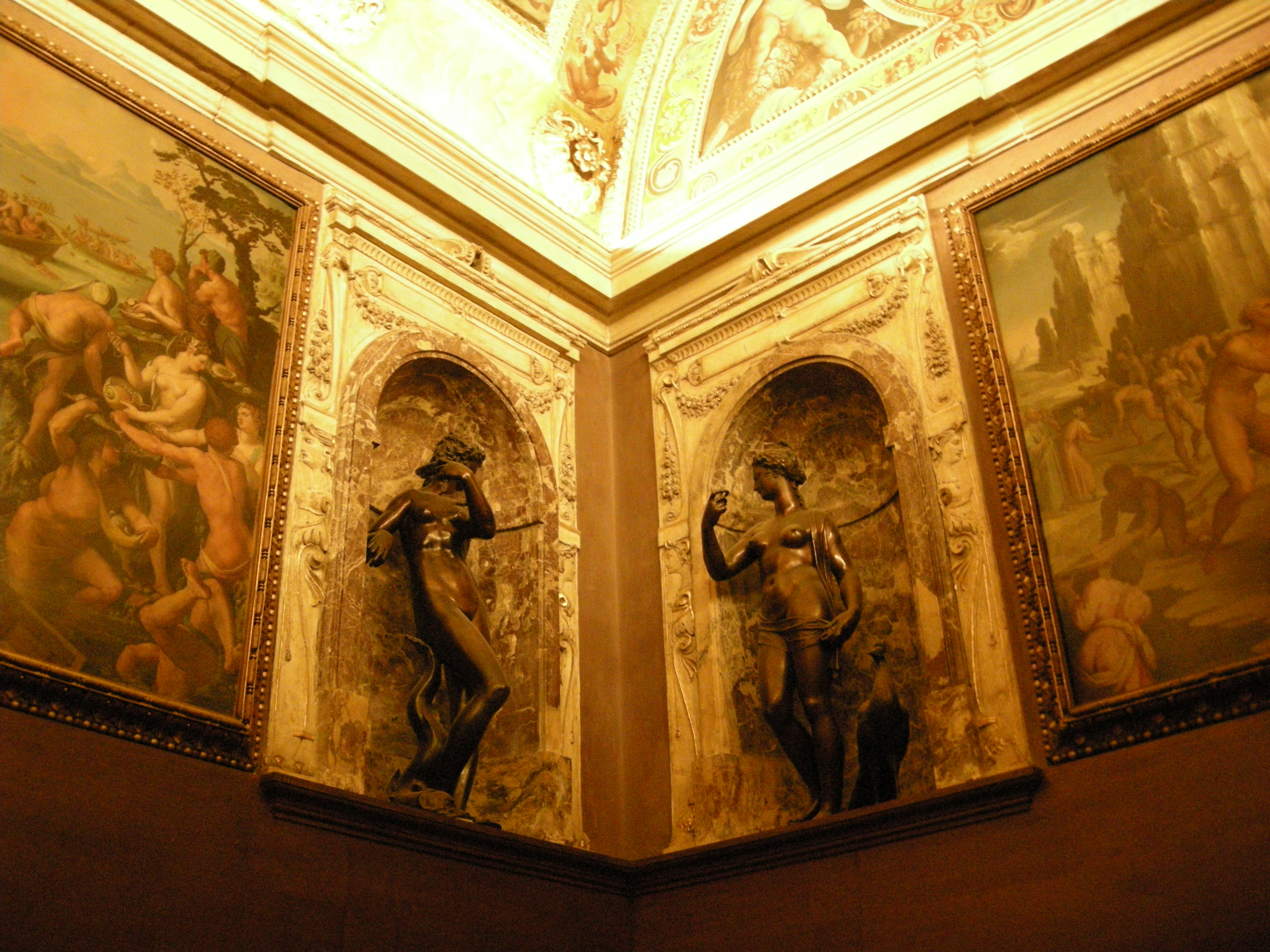

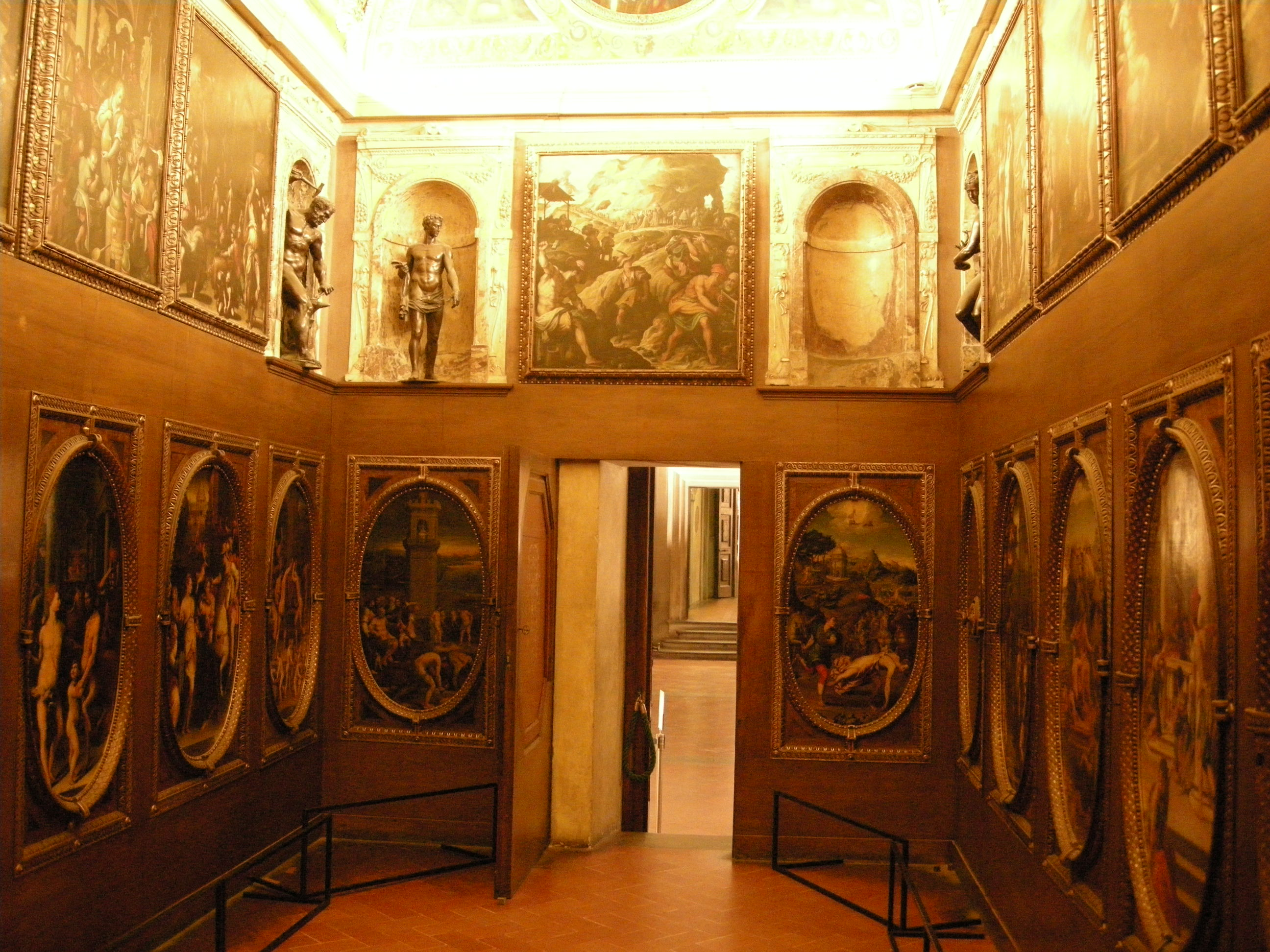
Portrait of Eleonora of Toledo

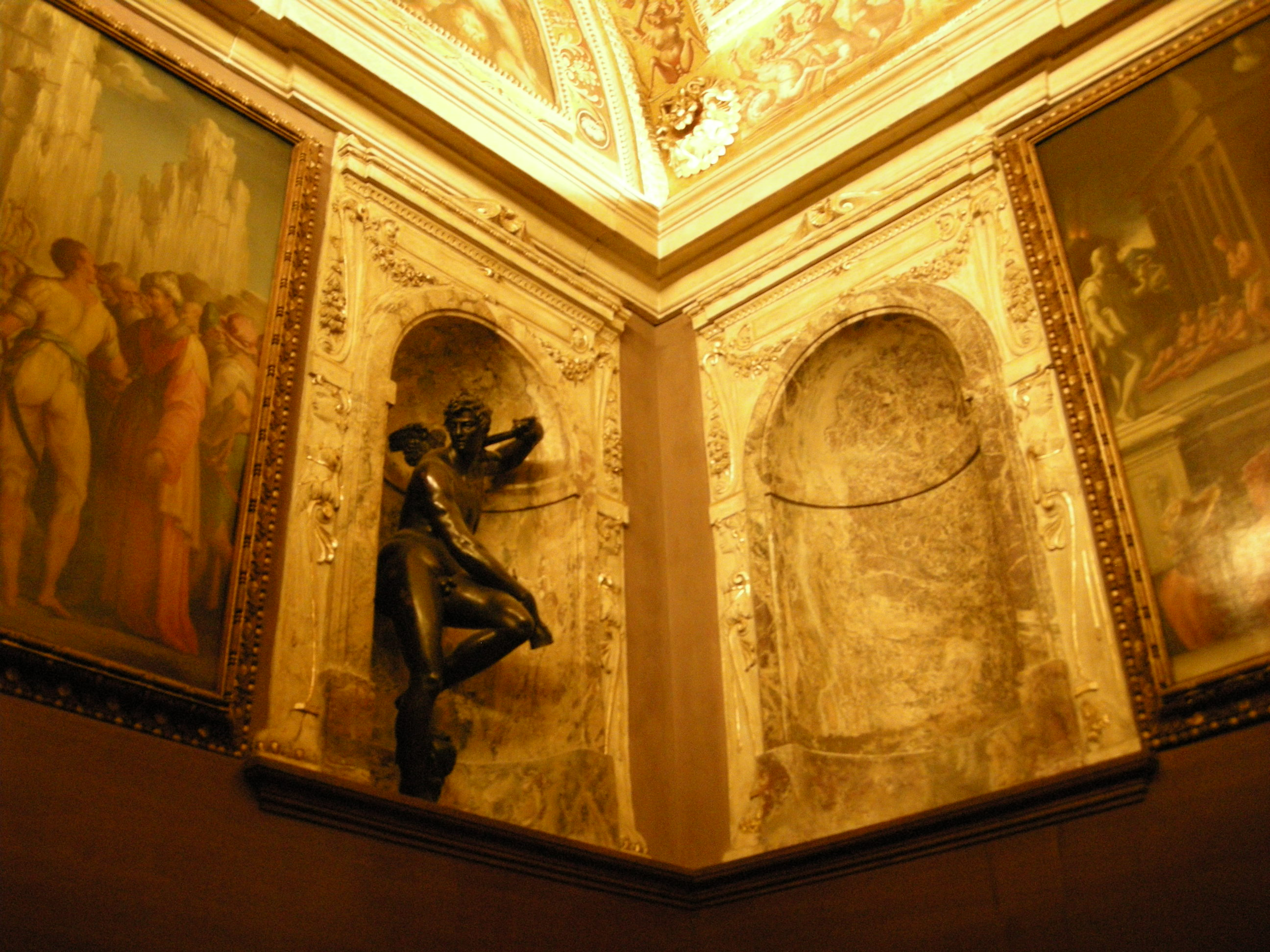
Bronze by Giambologna

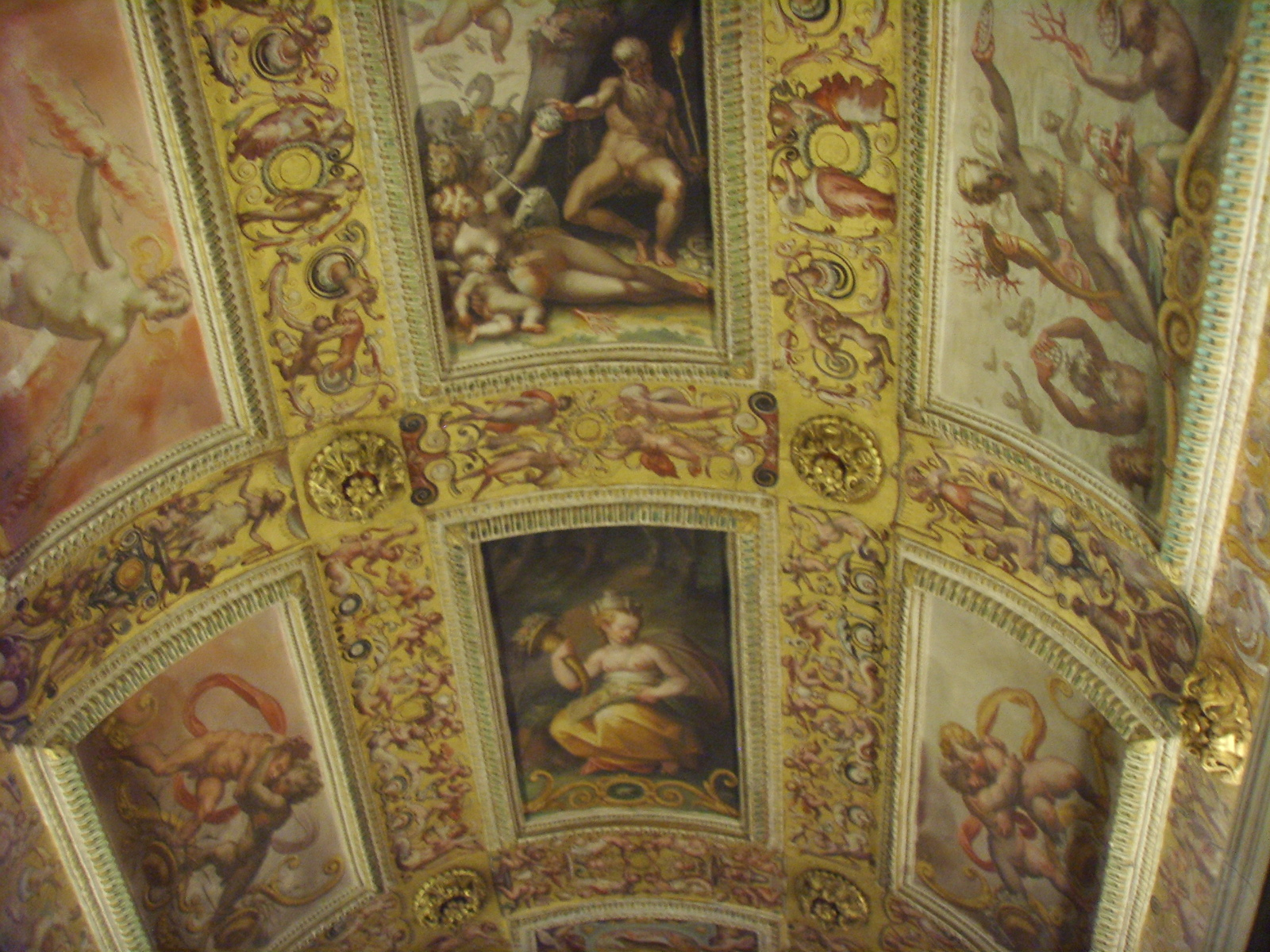
Vault fresco: Prometheus receives Precious Stone from Nature

Ovals of Studiolo

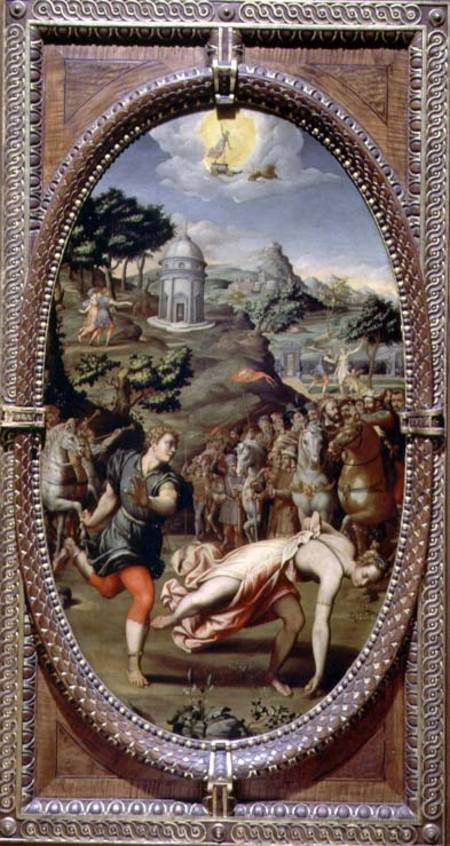
Atlanta and Hippomenes

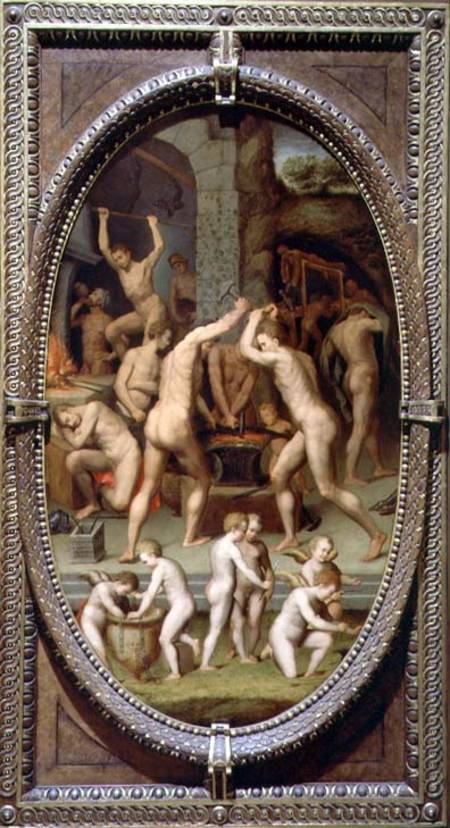
Forge of Vulcan

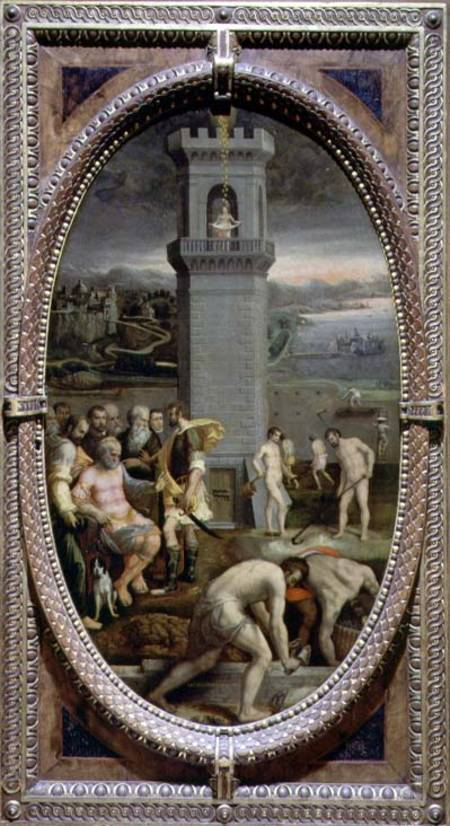
Danae

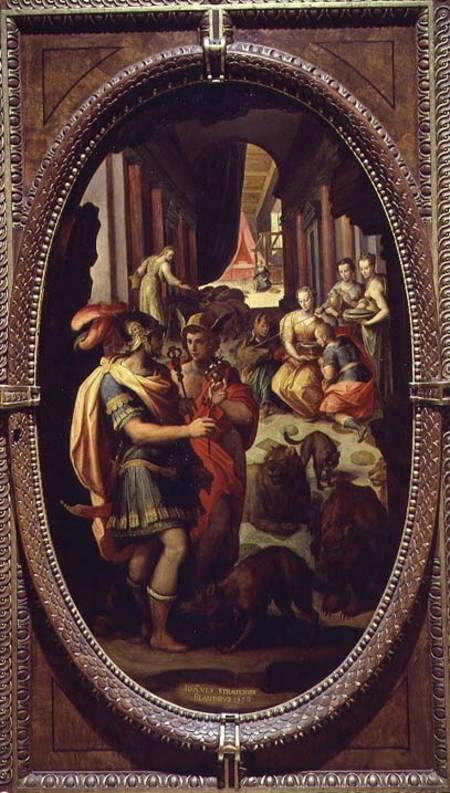
Ulysses, Mercury, Circe

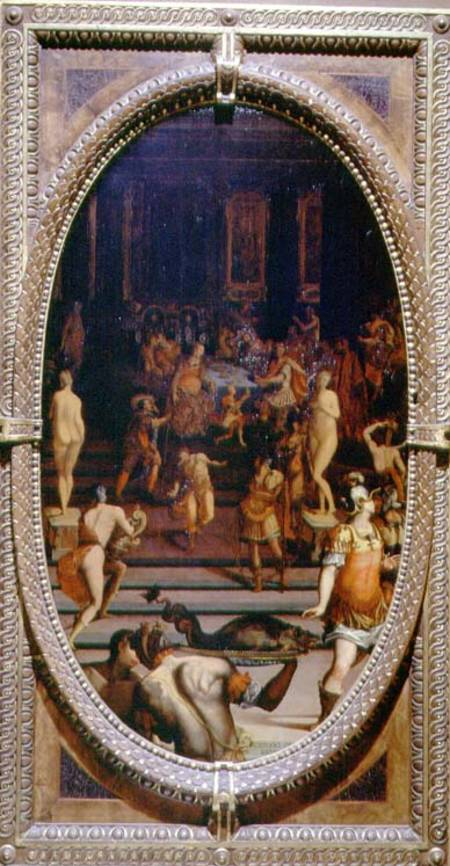
Ring of Polycrates

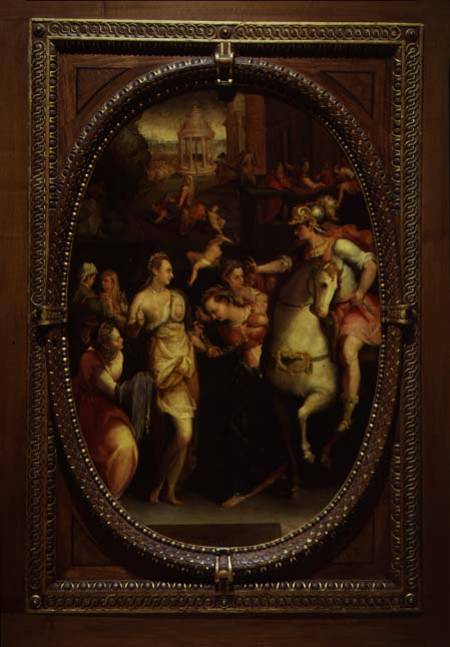
Darius’ Family before Alexander

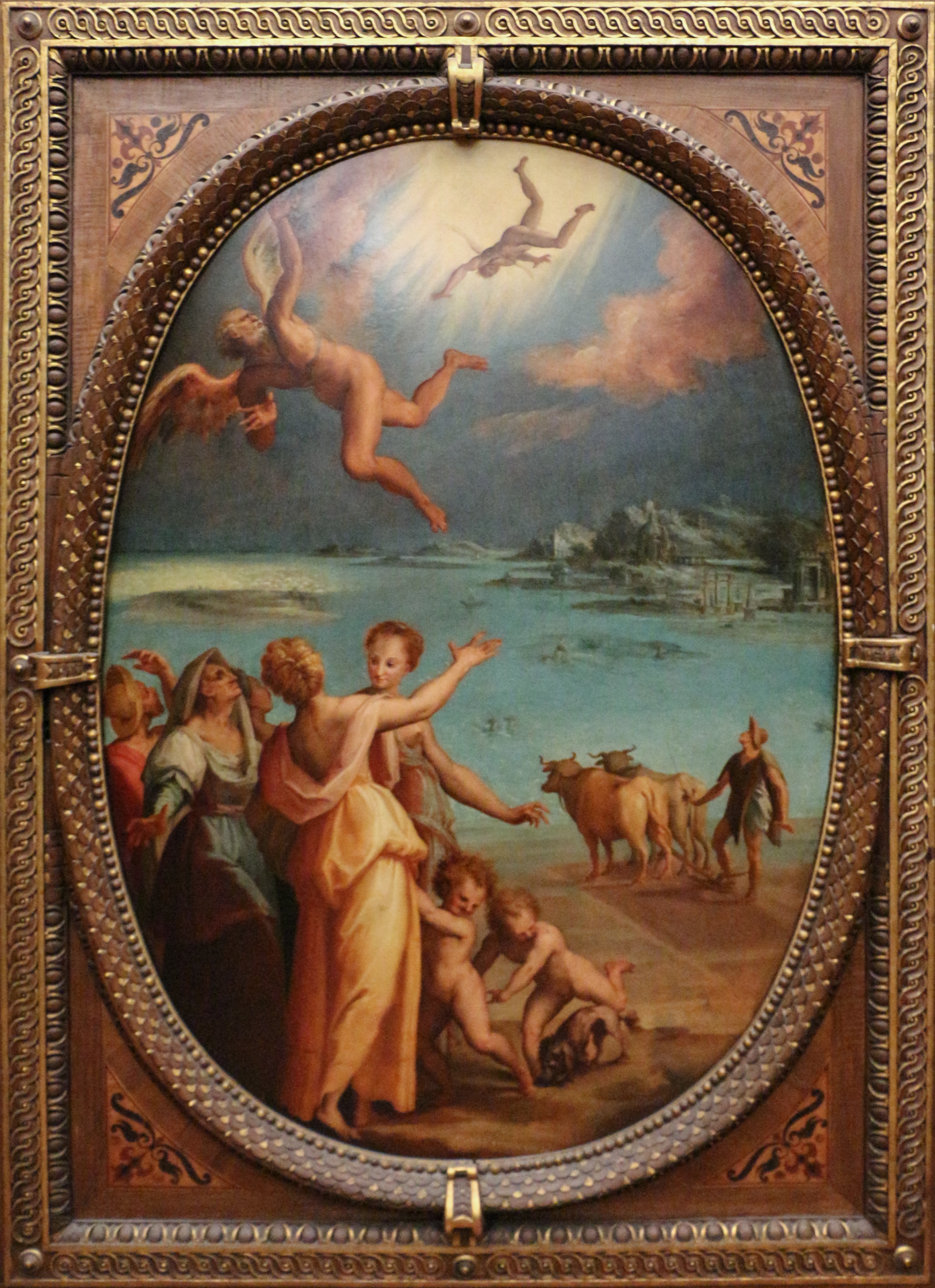
Fall of Icarus

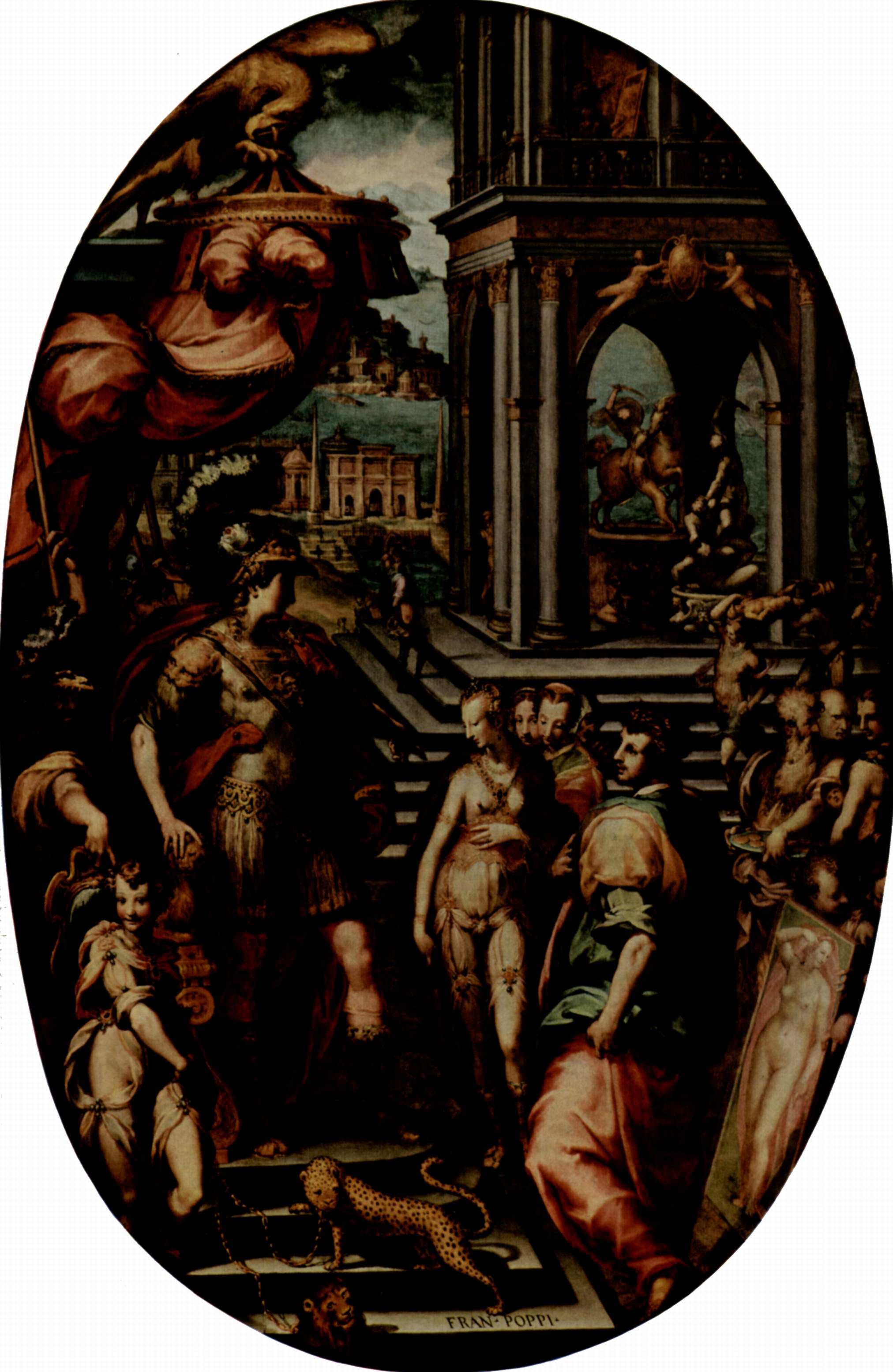
Alexander and Campaspe in Studio of Apelles

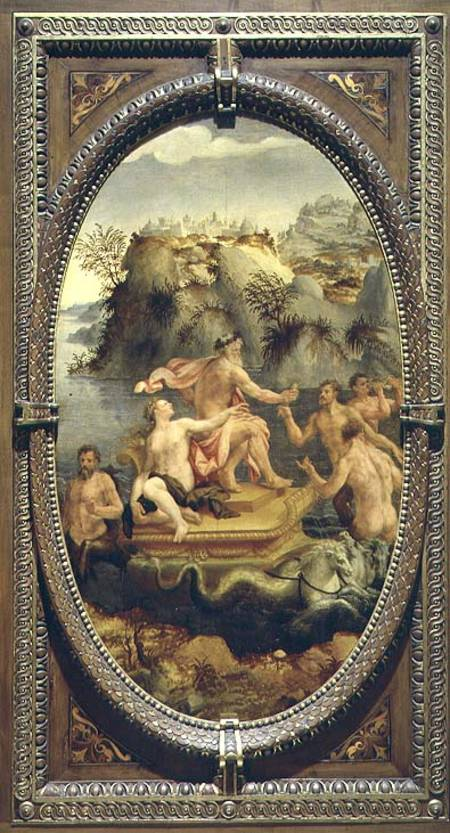
Neptune and Amphitrite

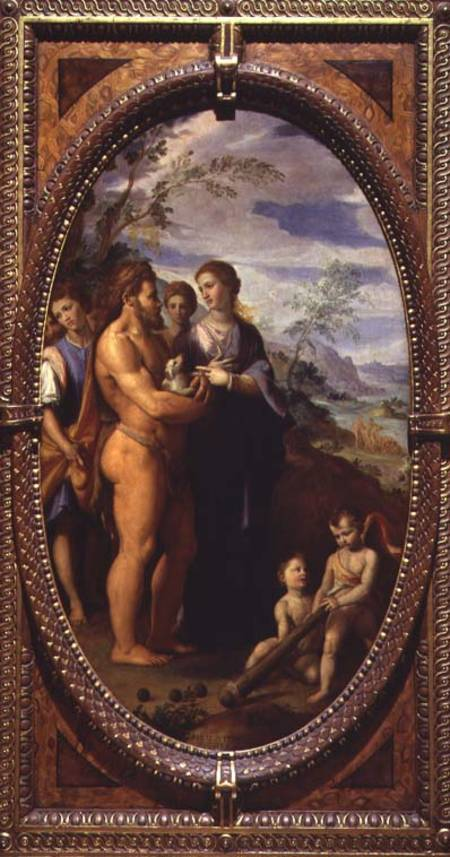
Hercules and Omphalus

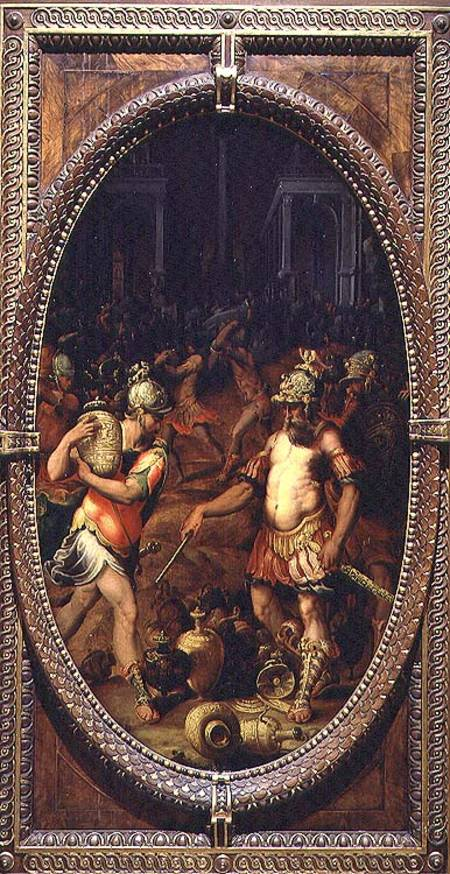
Sack of a City

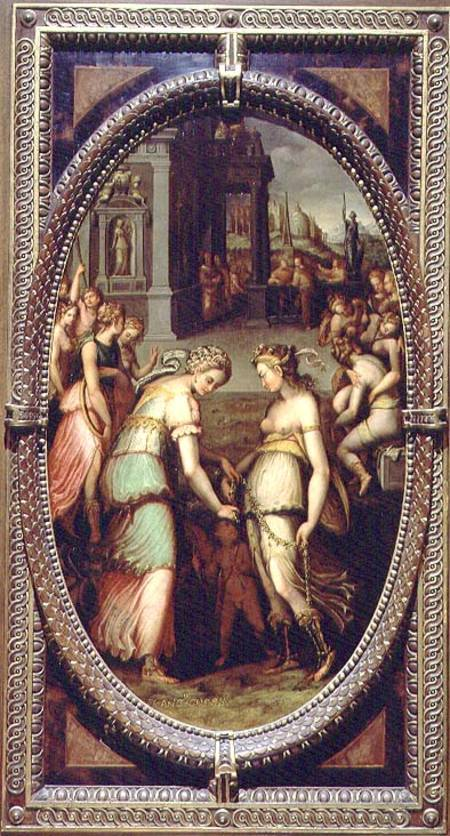
Juno takes Girdle of Venus

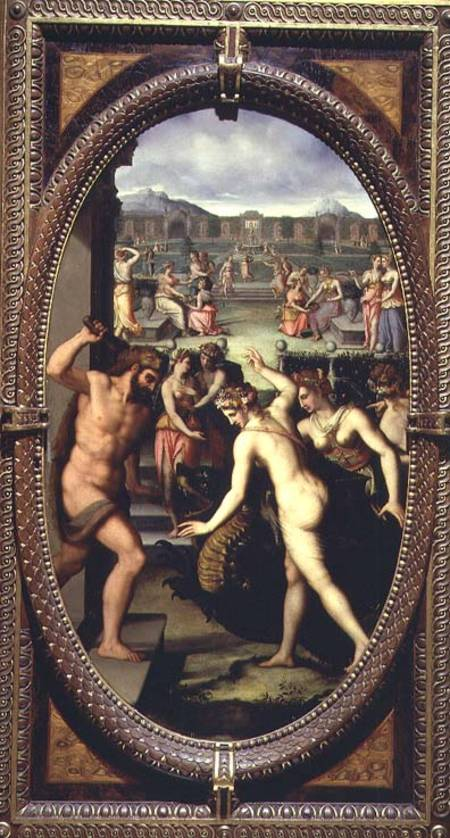
Hercules slays Dragon

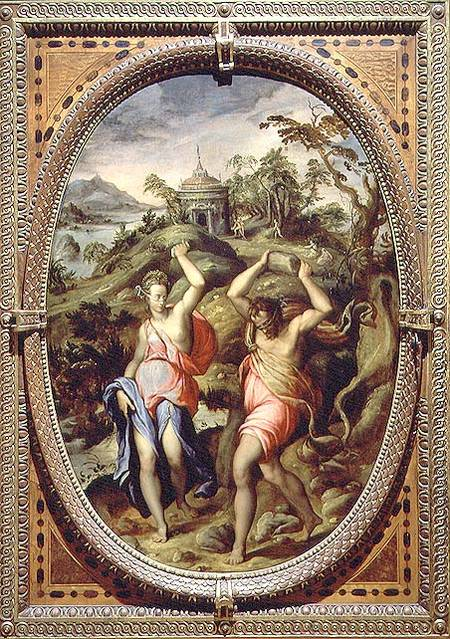
Deucalion and Pyrrha

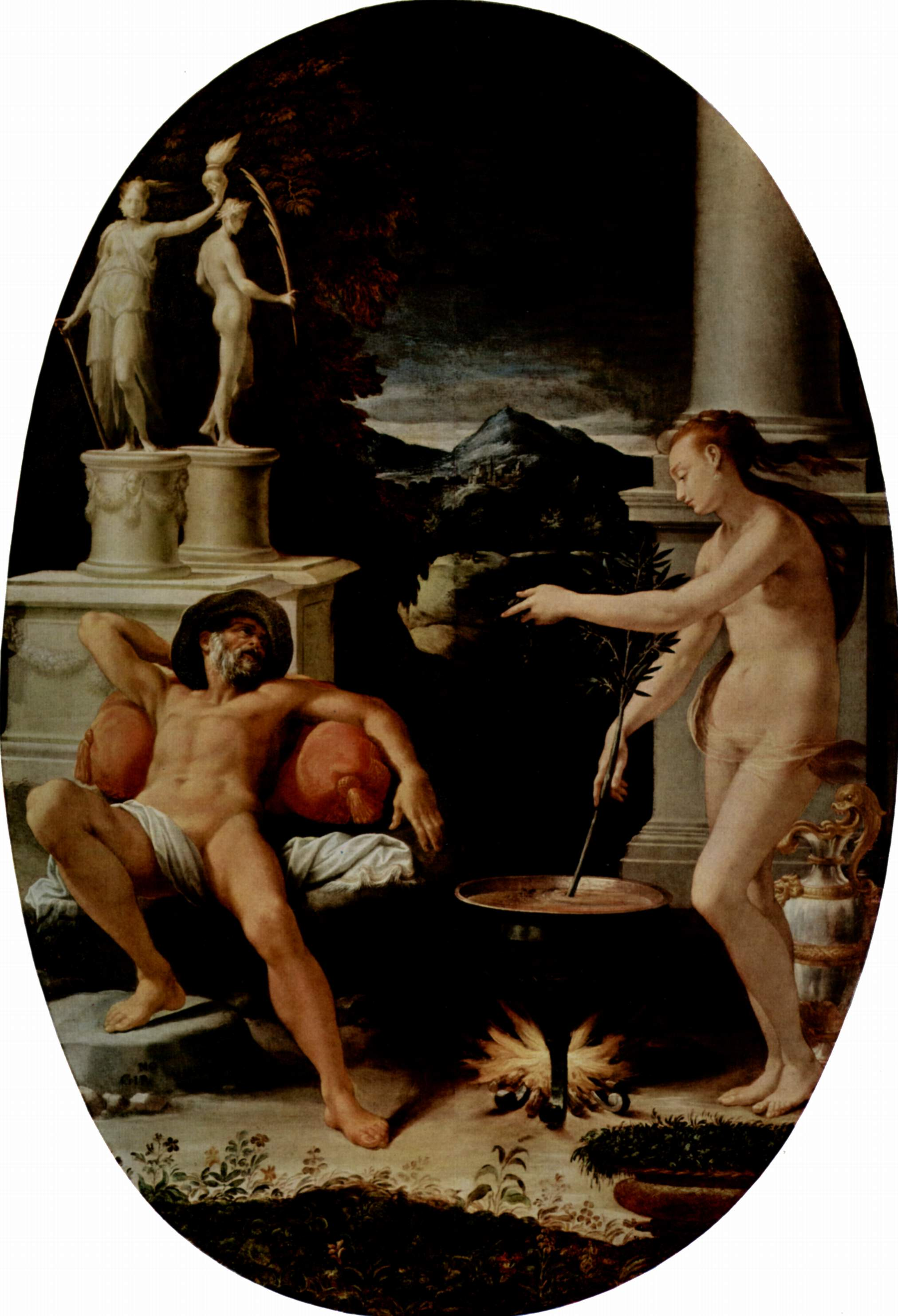
Jason and Medea

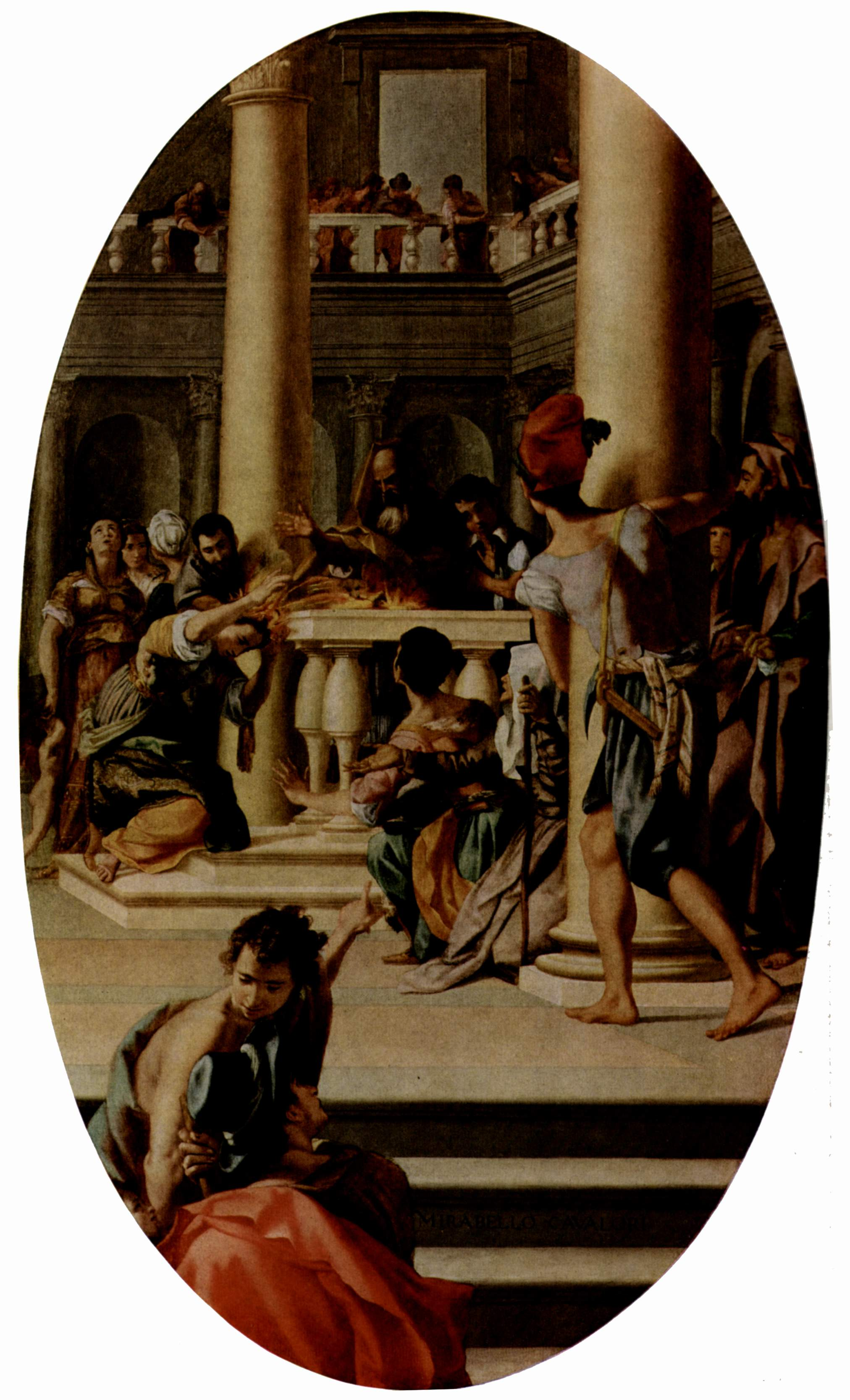
Lavinia at the Altar

Upper Rectangular Canvases of Studiolo

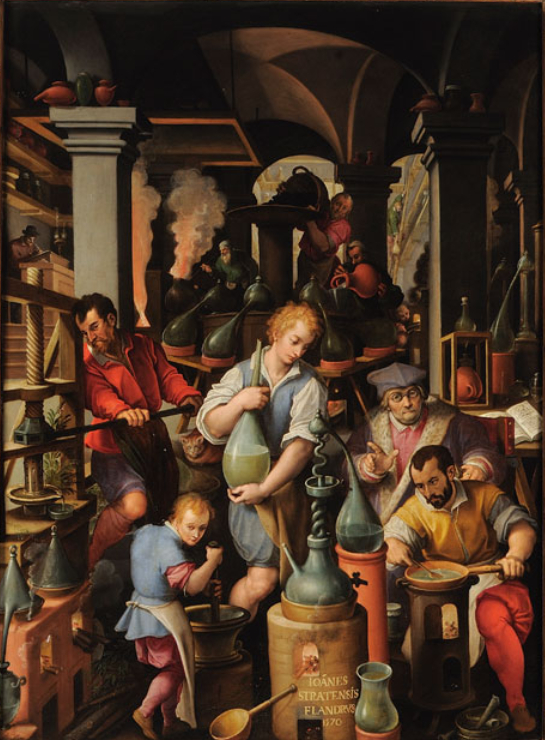
Alchemist's Studio

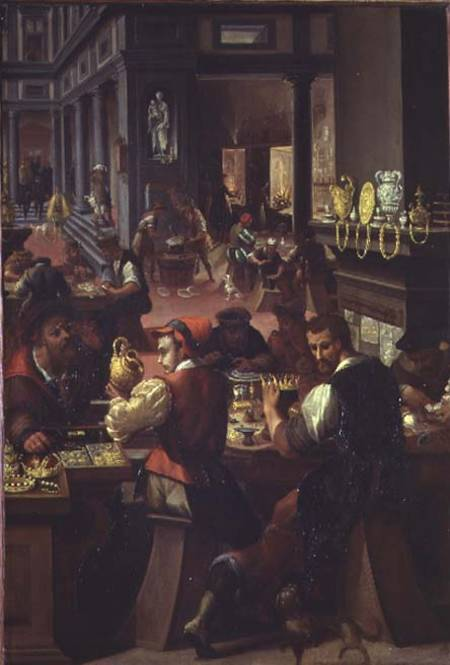
Jewelry Factory

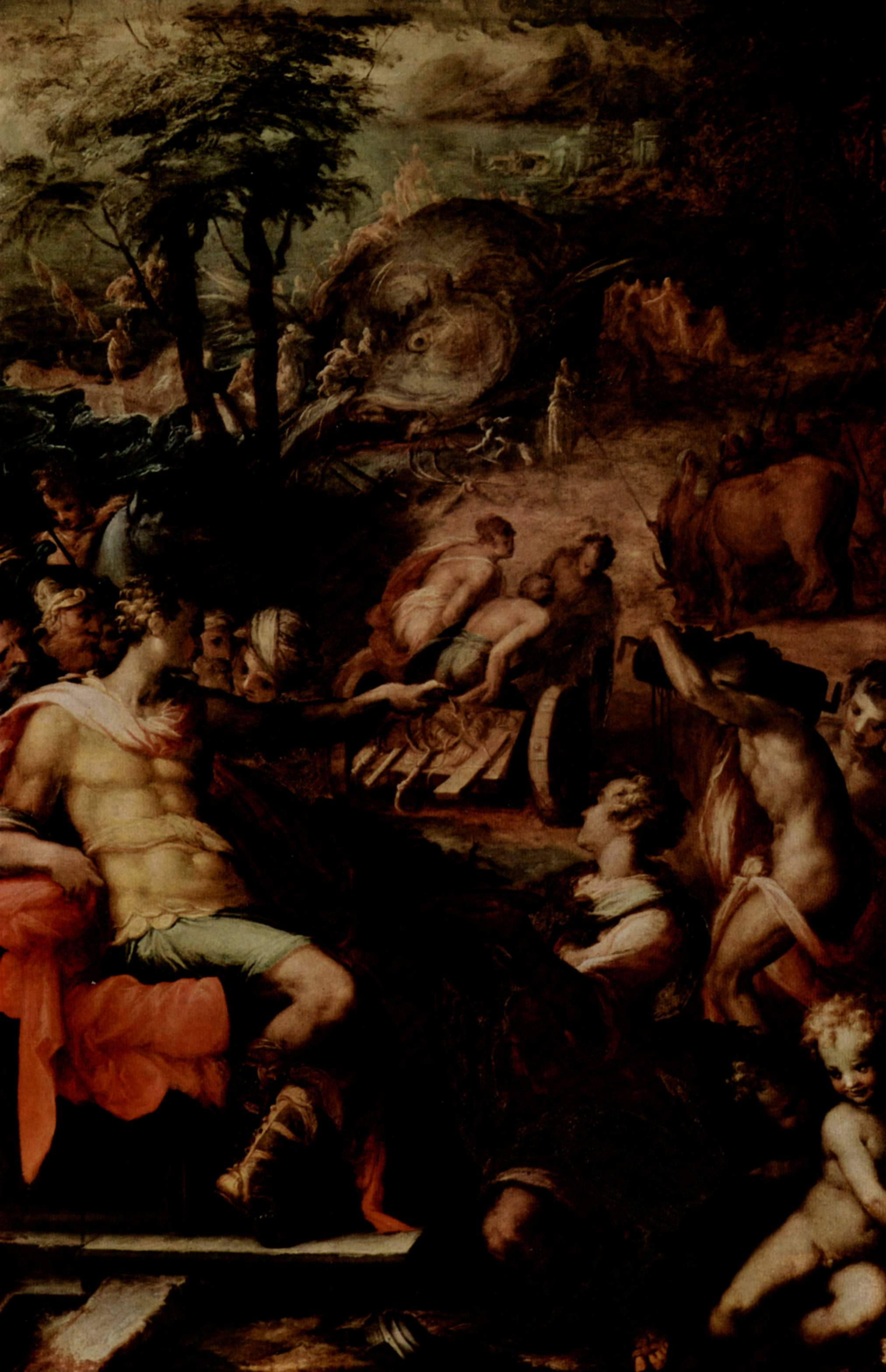
Gathering Ambergris

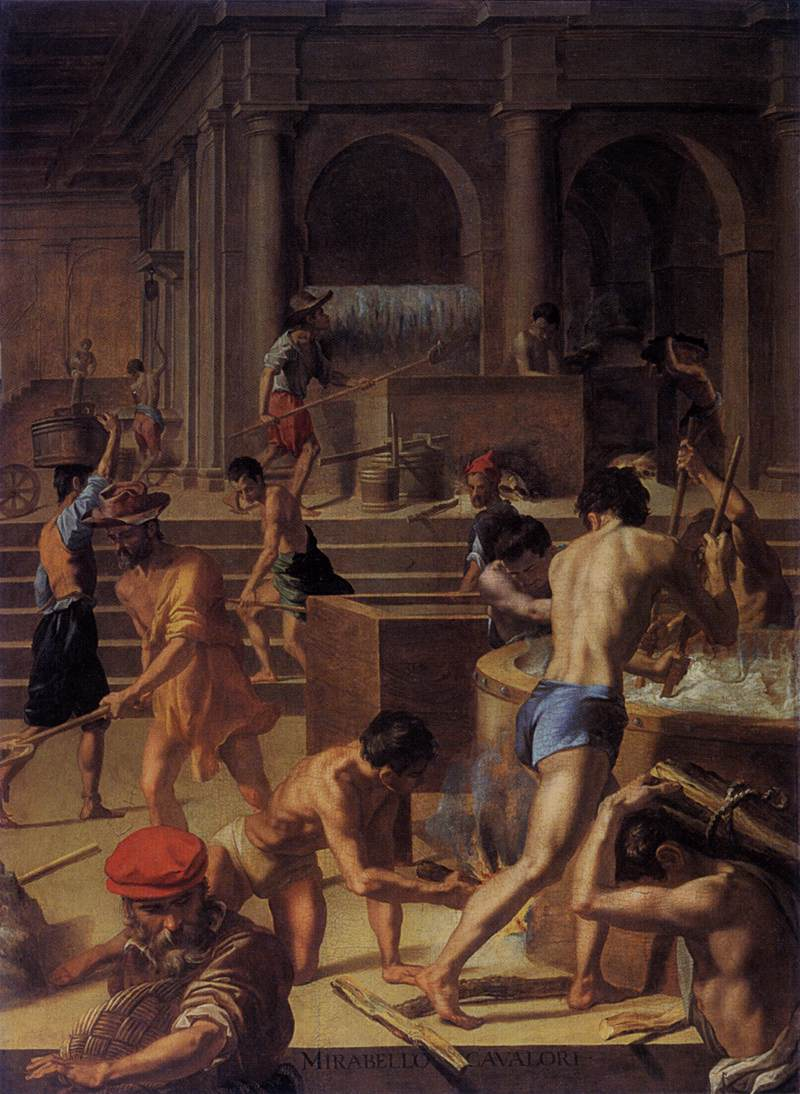
Woolmaking Factory

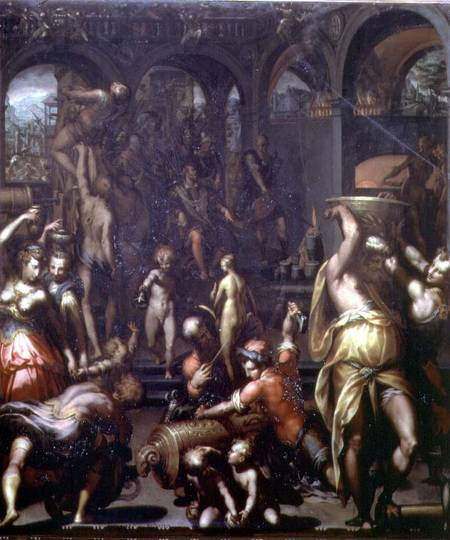
Bronze Foundry

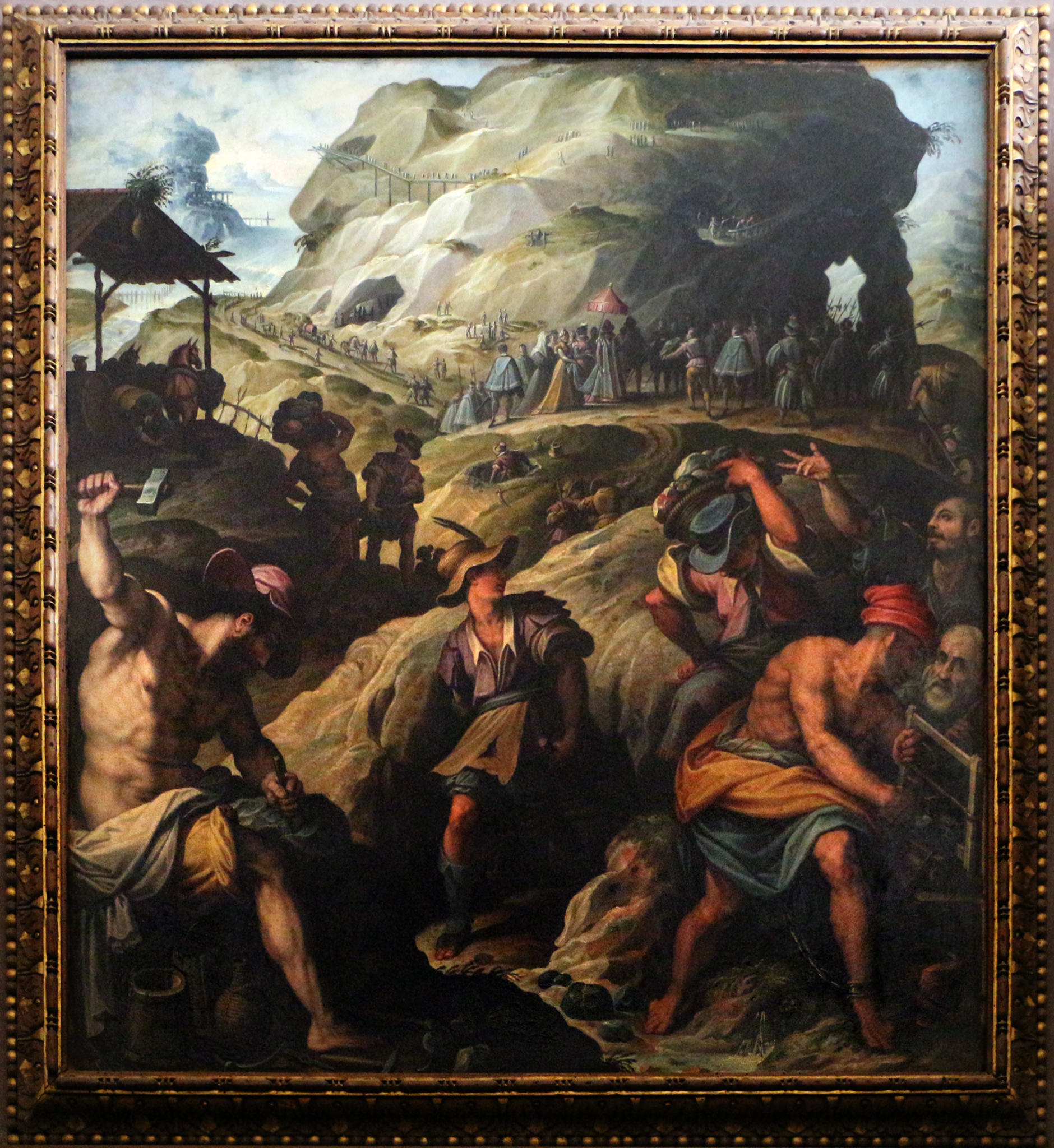
Mining

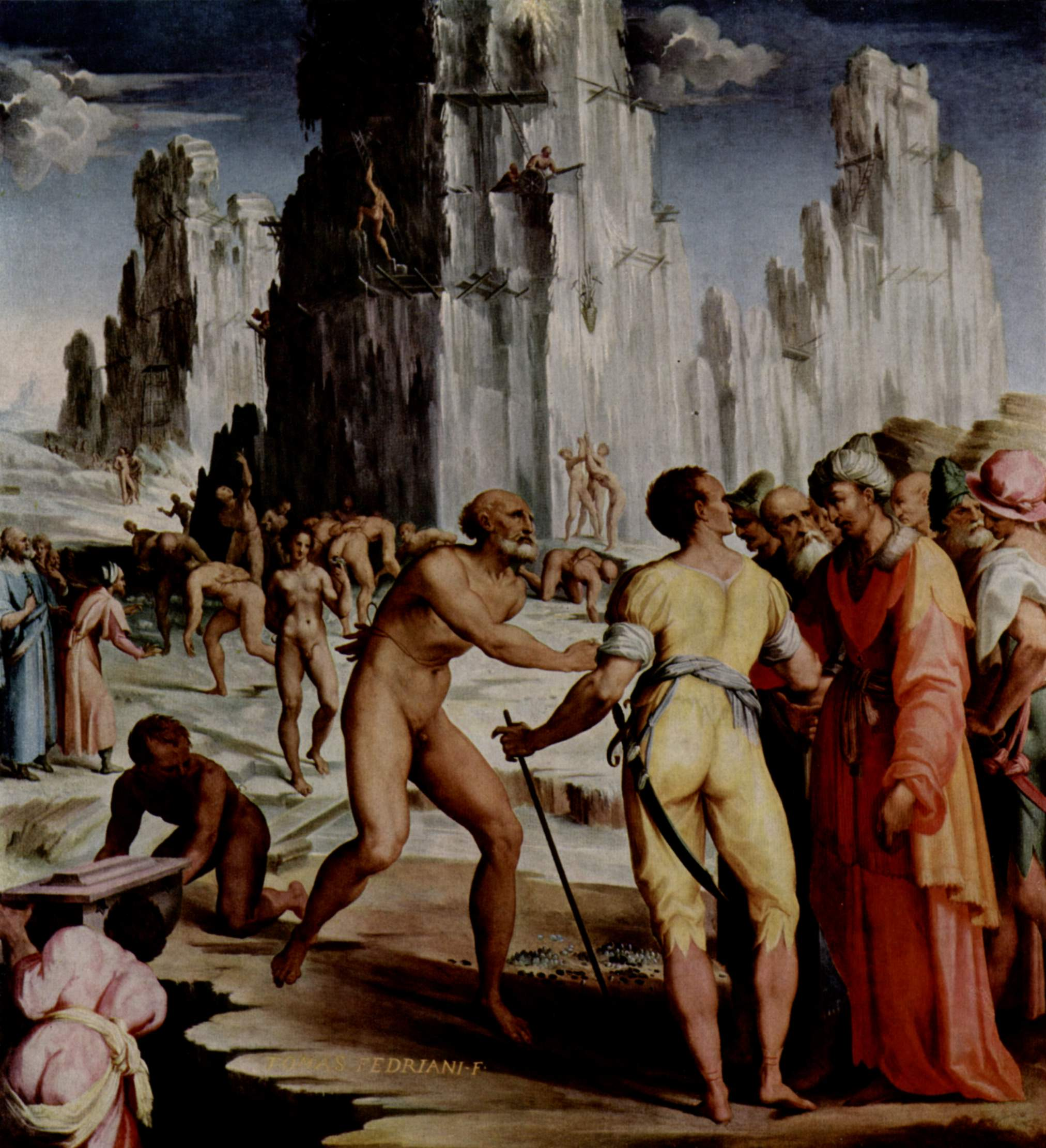
Diamond Mines

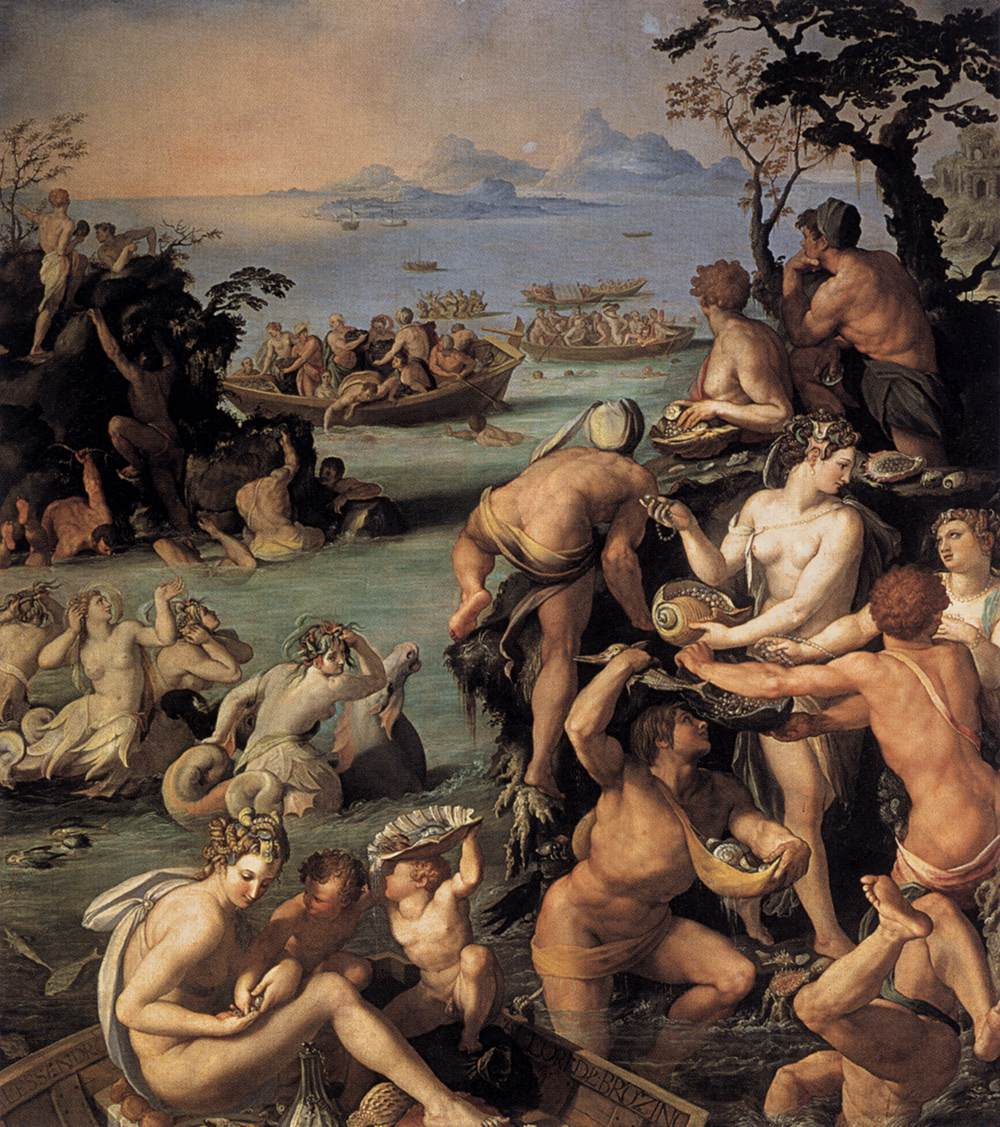
Pearl Fisherman

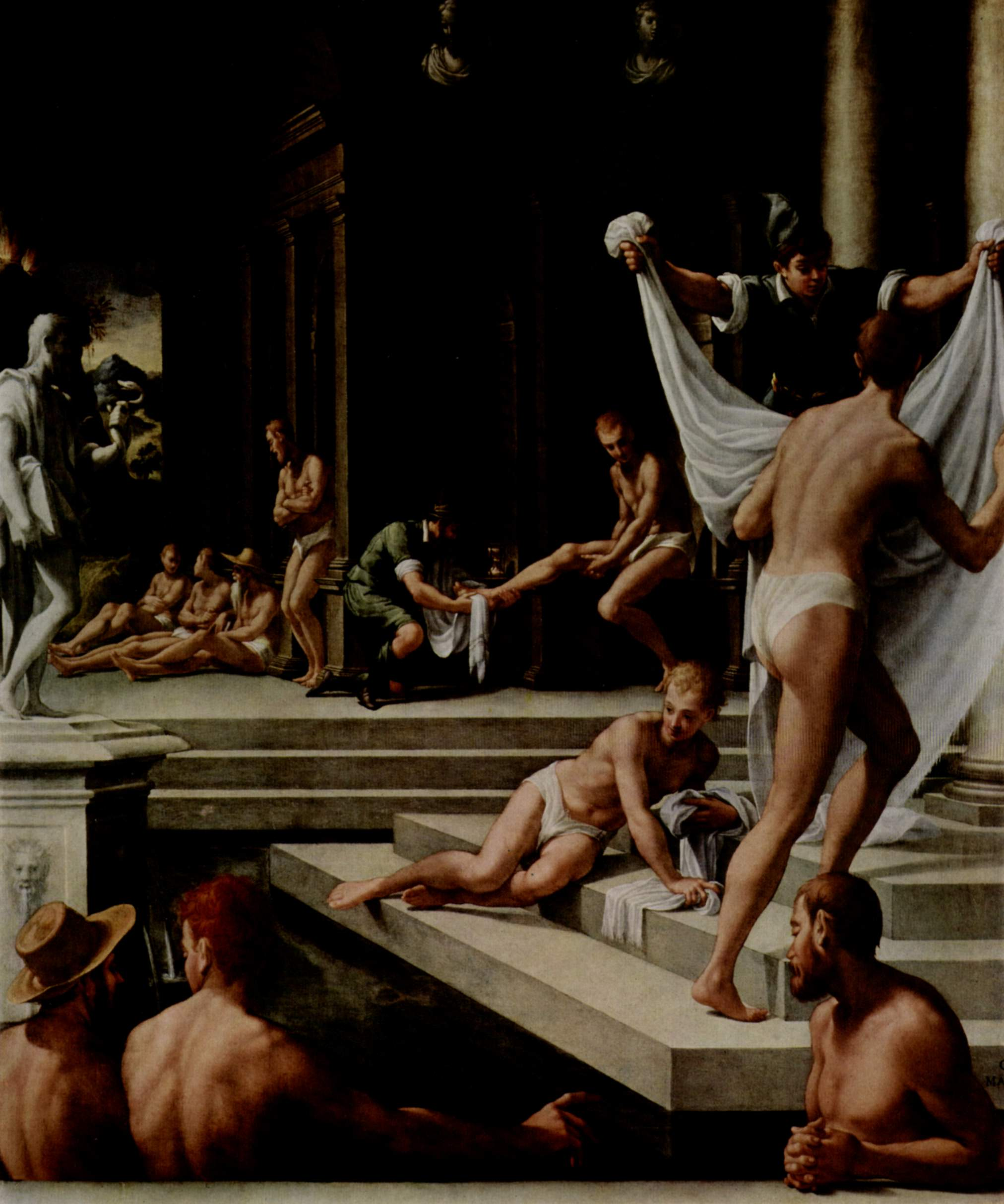
Thermal Baths at Pozzuoli

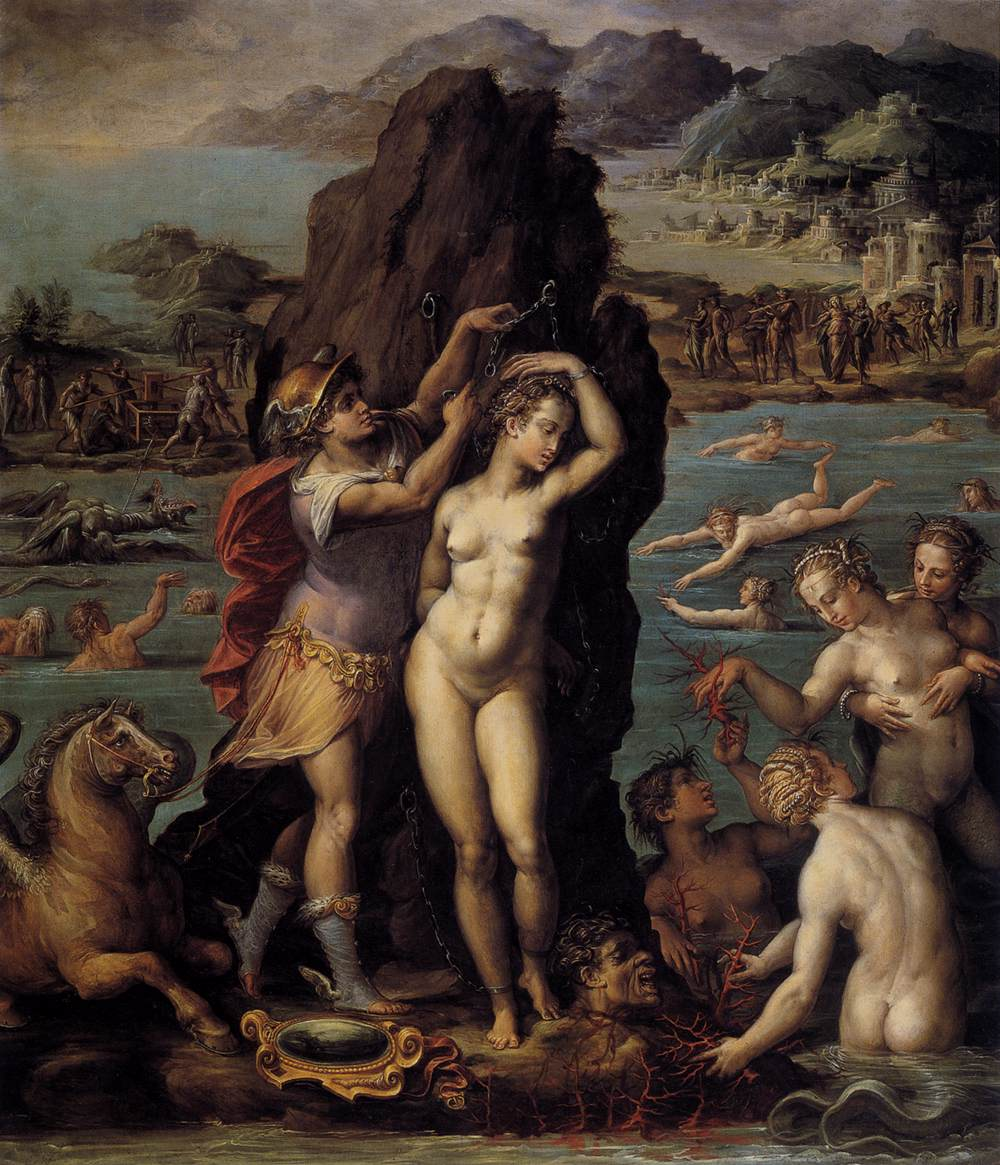
Perseus and Andromeda

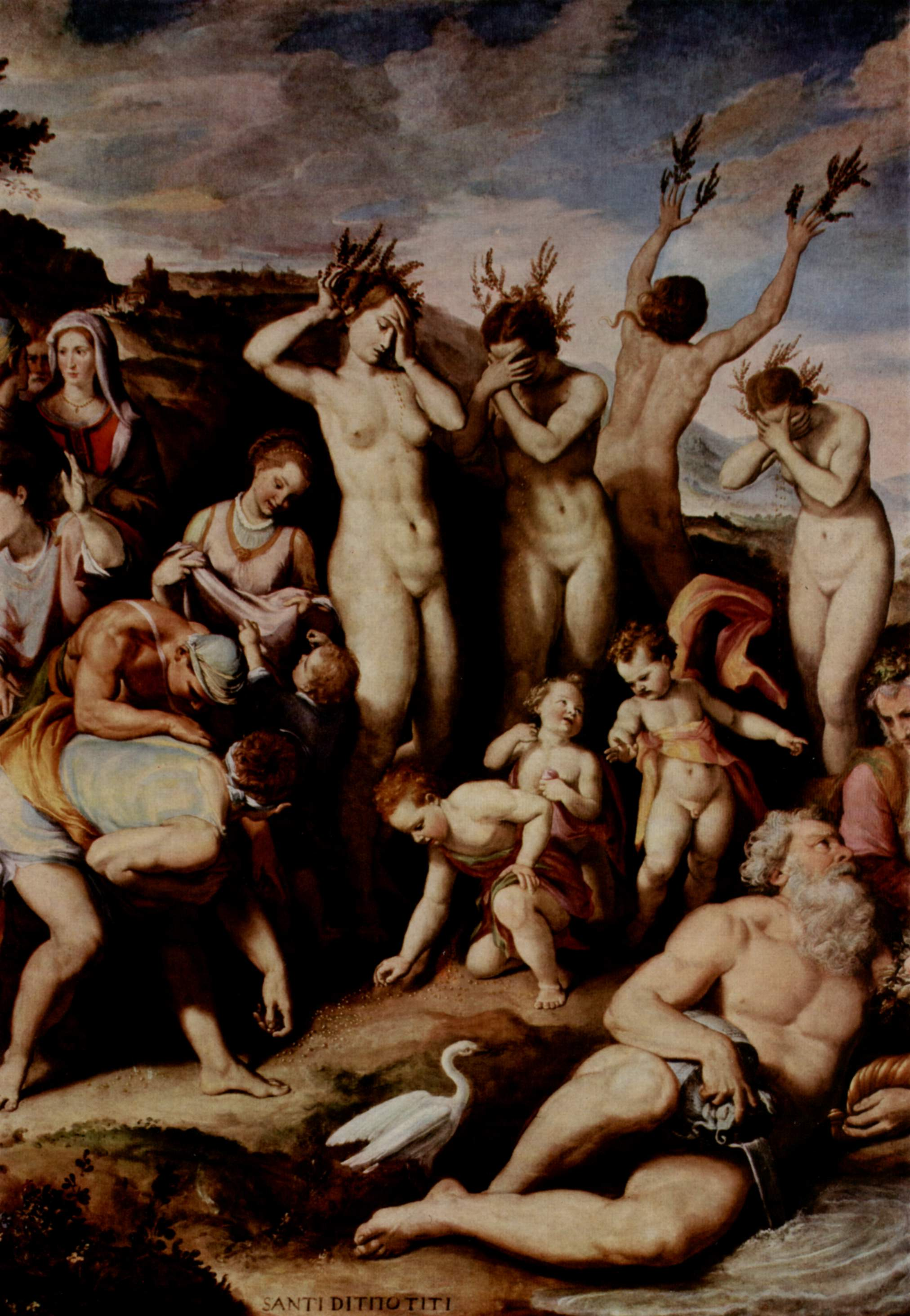
Sisters of Phaeton

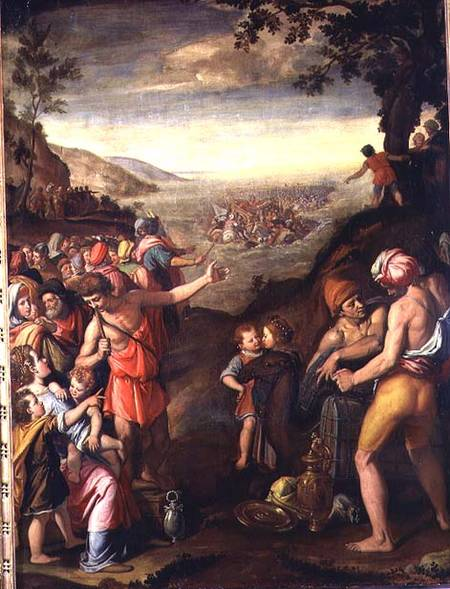
Moses parting Red Sea
