= Bartolomeo Traballesi =

Italian painter

Bartolomeo Traballesi (active 1560, died 1585) was an Italian painter active in Florence, Italy in a Mannerist style.

He was one of the painters engaged for the decoration of the Studiolo of Francesco I Medici in the Palazzo Vecchio of Florence.
