= Lorenzo dello Sciorina =

Italian painter

Lorenzo Vaiani, detto dello Sciorina (Florence, 29 Oct 1541 - Florence 2 June 1598) was an Italian painter of the Mannerist style. A pupil of Bronzino, he was part of the newly born "Accademia del Disegno" in Florence. He was employed in Giorgio Vasari's team that decorated of the Studiolo of Francesco I in the Palazzo Vecchio.
