= Alessandro Fei (painter) =

Italian painter

Alessandro Fei, del Barbiere
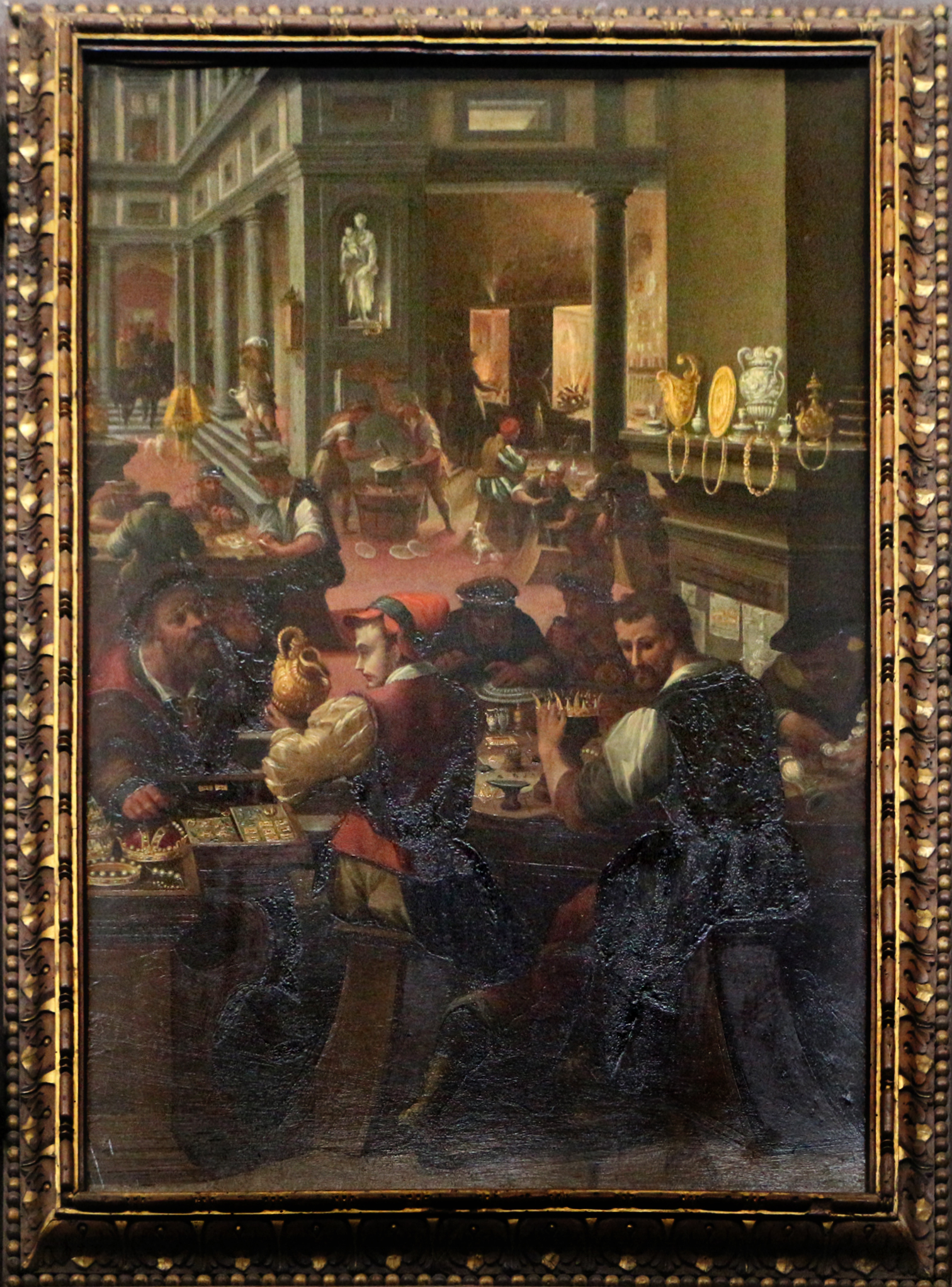
- Goldsmith's shop, Palazzo Vecchio, Florence
- Born: Alessandro Fei; 1543; Florence Tuscany, Italy
- Died: 1592 (aged 48–49); Florence Tuscany, Italy
- Known for: Painting
- Movement: Manierist

Alessandro Fei (1543–1592) was an Italian painter active in Florence, producing religious and decorative works in a Mannerist style. He was also called il Barbiere (the Barber). Fei was initially trained by Ridolfo del Ghirlandaio, one of the prominent Florentine painters, and also worked under Pier Francesco Foschi and was influenced by Maso da San Friano. His early works primarily featured religious themes, a reflection of the dominant artistic style of the time. One of his early notable works was The Mystic Marriage of St. Catherine, which he painted for the Compagnia di Santa Caterina in Florence. This piece demonstrates his meticulous technique and attention to detail.

Fei's artistic career flourished as he became involved in significant decorative projects and large commissions. His most notable works include frescoes for the decoration of Palazzo Vecchio in Florence, where he contributed to both the artistic and architectural embellishment of the palace. This work was part of a broader effort to adorn the home of the Medici family, reflecting their wealth and political power. Fei's style, which incorporated detailed, almost Flemish-like realism, was an appropriate choice for the Medici family, as it emphasized their political and social prestige. He participated in the Vasari-directed decoration of the Studiolo of Francesco I with an oval canvas relating a Goldsmith Shop story. He also painted an altarpiece on the Flagellation of Christ for the Basilica church of Santa Croce in Florence. Trained under Ridolfo del Ghirlandaio. Piero Francia, and under Tommaso Manzuoli, better known as Maso da San Friano, Fei became a member of the Accademia dell’Arte e del Disegno in Florence in 1563 and was a trusted assistant of Giorgio Vasari up until 1574. During the late 1570s, Fei was also involved in the decoration of the chapel of Francesco I de’ Medici, another important commission linked to the Medici court. Additionally, Fei's works extended to the Vatican, where he participated in the decoration of the Sistine Chapel under the supervision of Giorgio Vasari. His works, although often smaller in scale, played a role in the larger efforts to enrich the religious and political significance of these spaces.

In 1564, Fei participated in the creation of funerary arrangements for the celebrated artist Michelangelo, who had recently died. Fei contributed to this monumental project, which took place in the Medici Chapel in Florence, a crucial commission in honor of the great Renaissance master.

Throughout his career, Alessandro Fei continued to be recognized for his ability to work on large-scale decorative projects while retaining his skill for smaller, more intimate religious pieces. His work represents a fusion of Renaissance ideals with Baroque elements, positioning him as an artist who was capable of contributing to the evolving artistic movements of his time.

== Style ==
Fei del Barbiere's work is often characterized by its dramatic use of light and shadow, a hallmark of Baroque painting. This technique, known as chiaroscuro, was perfected by artists such as Caravaggio and later adopted by many Baroque painters across Europe. Fei del Barbiere, too, demonstrated a mastery of light, creating a dynamic tension in his works that drew the viewer's attention to specific figures or moments, creating a sense of movement and drama. Fei's style is noted for its combination of traditional Florentine painting techniques with a flair for meticulous detail, making it reminiscent of Flemish painting. This combination of elements is often seen as a way to blend the best of both the Italian Renaissance tradition and the detailed realism popular in the northern European schools of painting at the time.

== Works ==
His most famous works included The Goldsmith's Workshop, an oil-based painting, The Virgin and Saints and his five stone tiles The Life of the Virgin.
