= Mirabello Cavalori =

Italian painter (1535–1572)

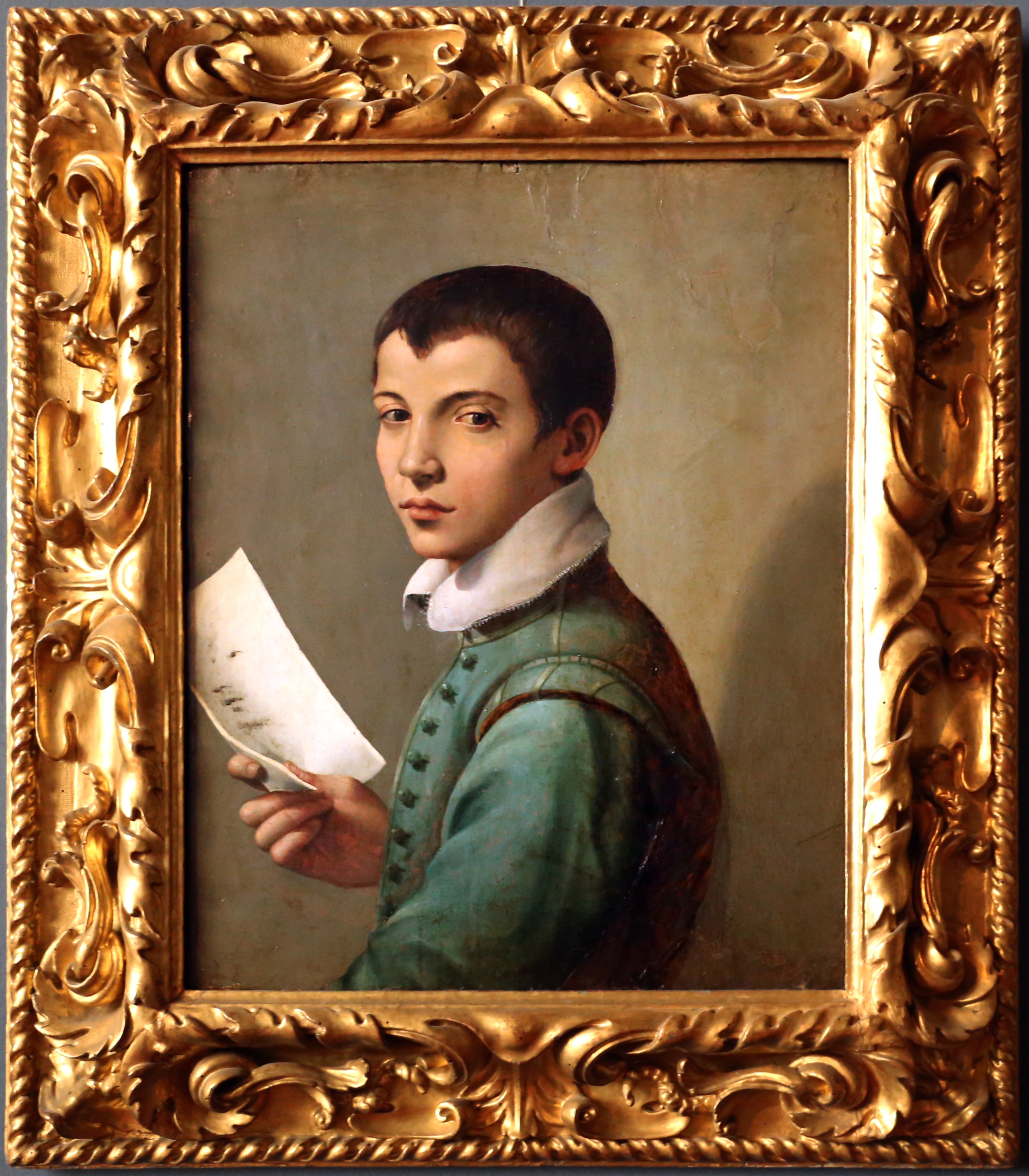
Portrait of a boy, 1560-70 ca.

Mirabello Cavalori (1535–1572) was an Italian painter of Mannerist style, active mainly in Florence.

Cavalori was born in Salincorno, near Montefortino. He was a contemporary of Maso da San Friano and younger than Vasari. The latter painter employed Cavalori in the decoration of the Studiolo of Francesco I in the Palazzo Vecchio, for which he produced The Wool factory and Sacrifice of Lavinia (Lavinia at the Altar). Also in the Palazzo Vecchio can be found paintings of the Blessing of Isaac.
