= Andrea di Mariotto del Minga =

Italian painter (1540–1596)

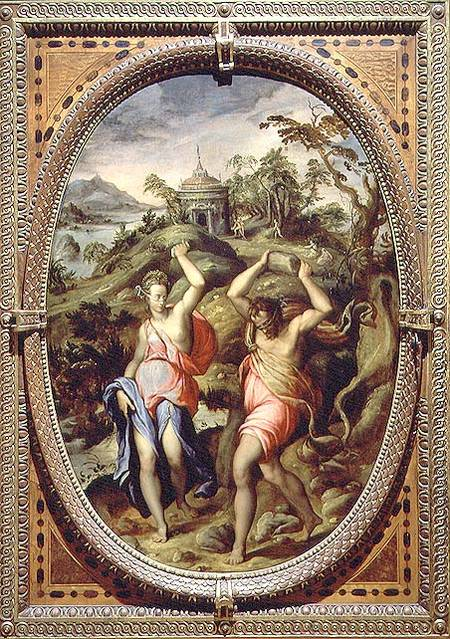
Decaulione and Pirra

Andrea del Minga or Andrea di Mariotto del Minga (1540–1596) was a Florentine painter of the Mannerist style. He was employed in Giorgio Vasari's team that decorated of the Studiolo of Francesco I in the Palazzo Vecchio.
