= Maso da San Friano =

Italian painter

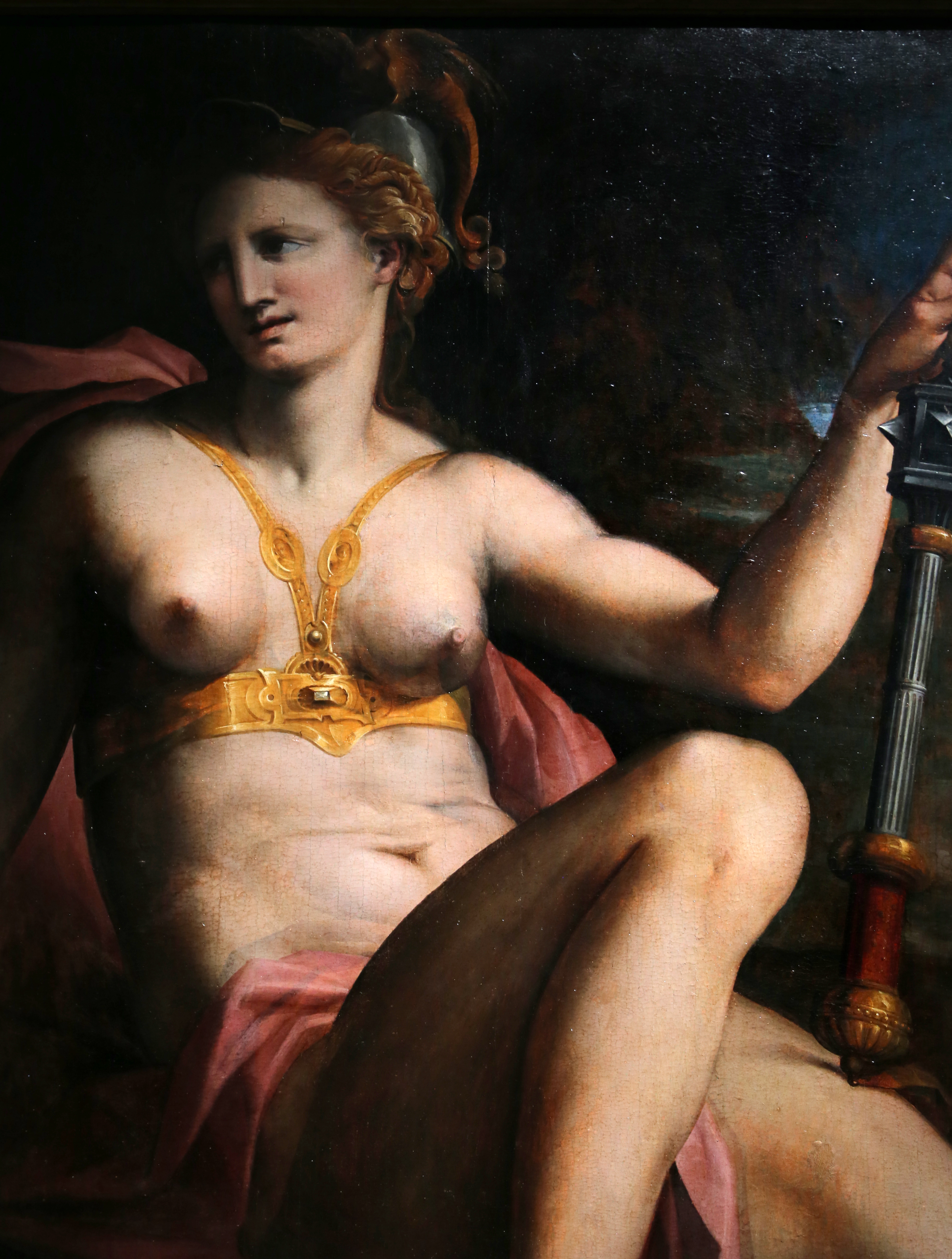
- Maso da San Friano, Allegory of the Fortitudo, Florence, Galleria dell'Accademia
- Born: Tomato d'Antonio Manzuoli, called Maso da San Friano; 1536; Florence Tuscany, Italy
- Died: 1571 (aged 34–35); Florence Tuscany, Italy
- Known for: Painting
- Movement: Manierism

Maso da San Friano (1536–1571) was an Italian painter active in Florence. His real name was Tomaso D'Antonio Manzuoli. He was born in San Friano and died in Florence.

== Life and career ==
He was born in Florence on 4 November 1531, in the area of Porta San Frediano, from which he derived his nickname. He received his early training in P.F. Foschi's workshop, educated in comparison with the greats of Mannerism, in particular Pontormo

According to Giorgio Vasari, Maso was a pupil of Pier Francesco Foschi while others claim it was Carlo Portelli, he was educated with the other important artist of Mannerism, in particular Pontormo He collaborated with an elder Michelangelo on some projects.

His altarpiece of the Visitation was painted in 1560 for the church of San Pier Maggiore, Florence - now in Trinity Hall Chapel, Cambridge, England. A similar work can be seen in the Prato cathedral. After 1561, he painted in the church of Ognissanti, Florence and in the church of Santa Felicita.

He is regarded as part of the Counter-Maniera or Counter-Mannerism movement in Florence. His most important pupils were Jacopo da Empoli and Alessandro Fei.

One of his paintings, thought to be of Cosimo I de Medici in 1560, is believed to be the oldest to show a watch.

He died in 1571 and was buried in the Church of the Carmine in Florence on 2 October.

== Painter of the Studiolo of Francesco I ==
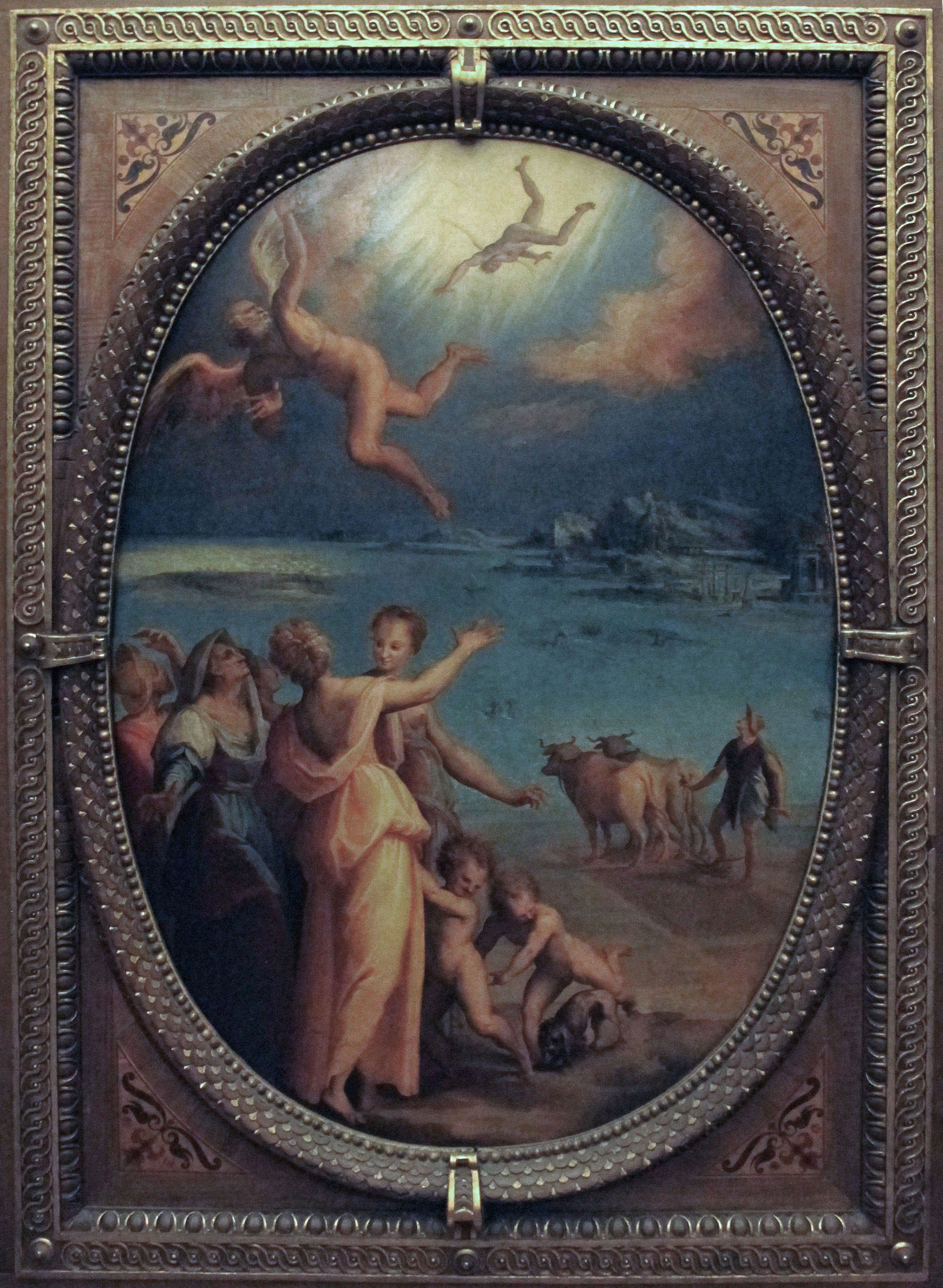
Fall of Icarus, Palazzo Vecchio, Studiolo, Florence.

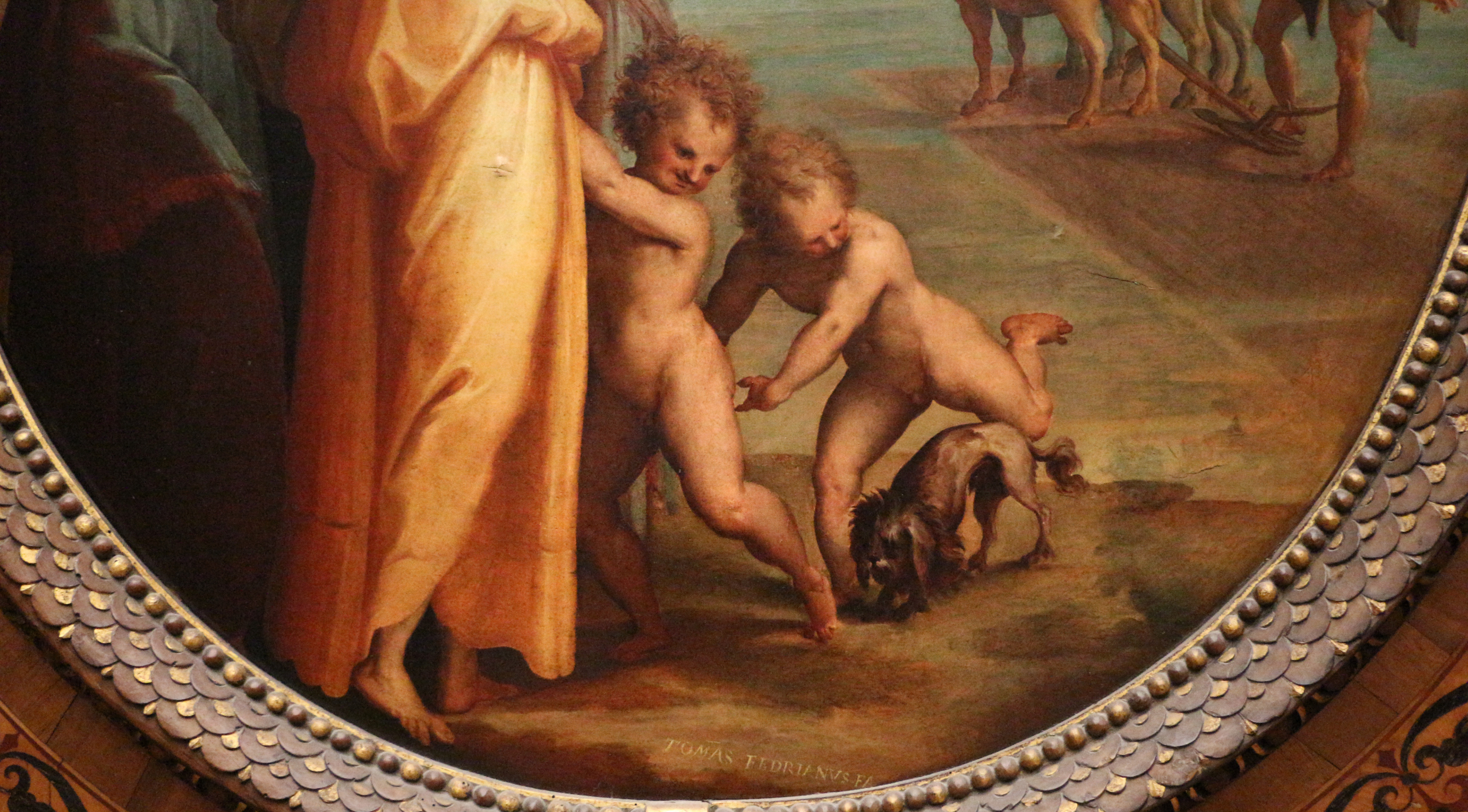
Fall of Icarus, detail, Palazzo Vecchio, Studiolo, Florence.

Between 1570 and 1571, the two visionary panels for the so-called Studiolo of Francesco I in the Palazzo Vecchio in Florence, the painter's true artistic testament, were completed. Coordinated by Giorgio Vasari, the collective undertaking of decoration saw Maso engaged on the western wall, dedicated to the element of air. Between mythological erudition, hermetic symbolism and perhaps also magical-alchemical allusions, he faithfully adhered to the programme in the upper register panel. The primary source of reference for the Diamond Mine was Pliny's discussion of crystal. Derived from the solidification of atmospheric moisture cooled by the winds, it was often juxtaposed with the precious materials painted by Maso, as naked men collect them against the backdrop of a rugged, shimmering mountain, climbed with ropes and baskets by other prospectors. The bizarre posture of the figures, with one hand tied behind their backs, seems to evoke the chains of Prometheus, celebrated in the ceiling of the studiolo and recalled in Natural History precisely with regard to man's passion for gems. The crowded and colourful scene in the foreground, where one of the nudes offers stones to exotically clad characters, calls to mind literature on the Indies, in particular Garcia da Orta, from which the motif takes its inspiration. The oriental composition seems to have been elaborated by Maso on the basis of his own drawing (Rennes, Musée des beaux-arts), itself inspired by an engraving by Luke of Leiden, in circulation in Florence since the beginning of the century. In the case of the oval of the Fall of Icarus in the lower band, intended to decorate one of the doors of the cupboards in which Francesco's collection of rarities was kept, the choice of the motif is part of a complex system of correspondences between the iconographic programme and the objects kept in the studiolo. Rather than alluding to feather artefacts, the Ovidian subject, in itself pertinent to the theme of air, still refers to Plinian theory on crystal, evoking the presence of refined artefacts produced by the Medici craftsmen. Maso's painting of facetted planes and precious colours confirms his decisive Pontormesque ancestry, to which the characterised counterpoint of the characters and their articulate gestures refer, especially in the Diamond Mine. A talent for small-format figures and refined execution make Maso's panels one of the most fantastic and whimsical creations of the last season of the Florentine manner.

== Sources ==
- Freedberg, Sydney J. (1993). Pelican History of Art (ed.). Painting in Italy, 1500-1600. Penguin Books Ltd. p. 611. ISBN 0-14-056135-8.
- Cannon Brookes, Peter (1965). "Three Notes on Maso da San Friano". The Burlington Magazine. pp. 192–197.
