= Alfonso Aldiverti =

Italian painter

Alfonso Aldiverti (early 17th century) was an Italian painter of the early Baroque period, active mainly in Rovigo.

He was born the son of a notary. He painted Scenes from the life of Christ for the church of Santa Maria della Neve, including a Christ Condemned (1615). He also painted a St. Charles Borromeo for the church of San Bartolommeo in Rovigo.

He trained under Domenico Stella in Rovigo. His uncle, the priest Fabrizio Aldiverti, was an Inquisitor of the Holy Office (Roman Catholic Inquisition).
