= Giovanni Maria Butteri =

Italian painter (1540–1606)

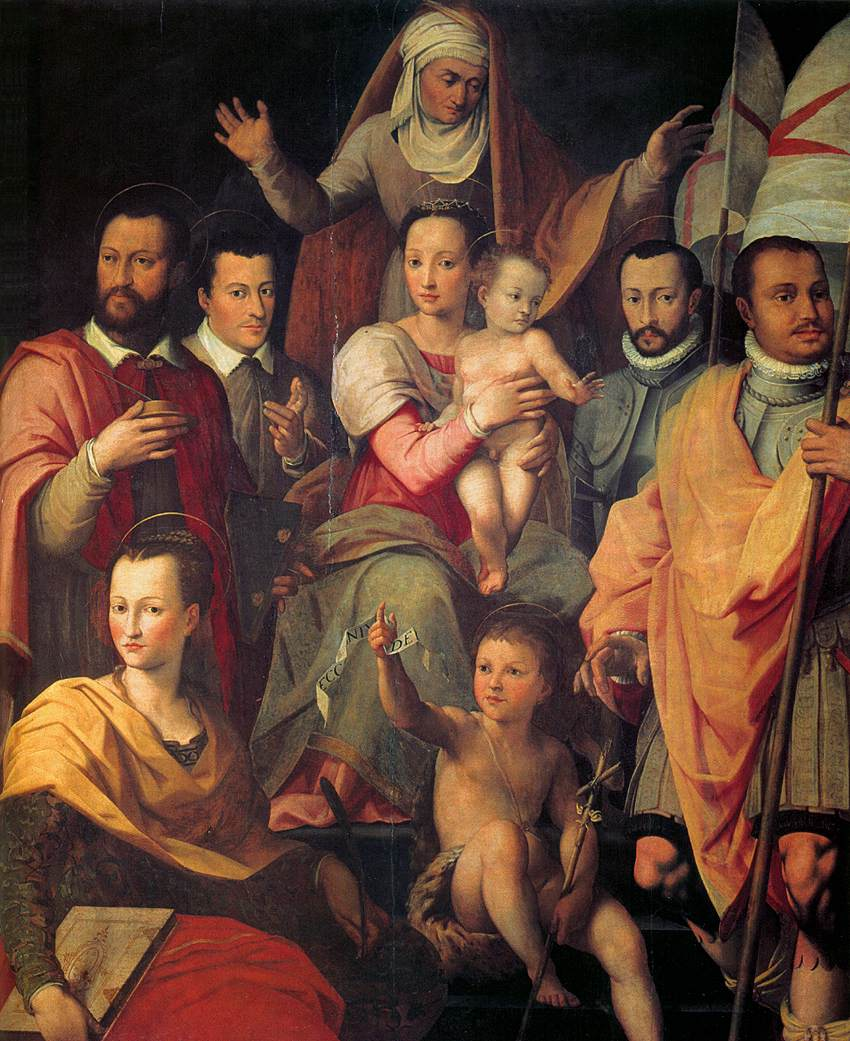
Giovanni Maria Butteri: The Medici as the Holy Family, 1575

Giovanni Maria Butteri (1540–1606), also known as Giovanmaria Butteri, was an Italian painter of the Mannerist period, active in his native Florence.

He was a pupil of Alessandro Allori and Francesco Salviati. He participated in the fresco decoration of the large cloister at Santa Maria Novella. Other works can be found at the churches of Santa Monica and San Barnaba in Florence, as well as in the Civic Museum in Prato. He also contributed a canvas for the programme of the Studiolo of Francesco I in the Palazzo Vecchio: a visit by Prince Francesco I de'Medici to Bortolo d'Alvise's glassworks.
