= Carlo Portelli =

Italian painter

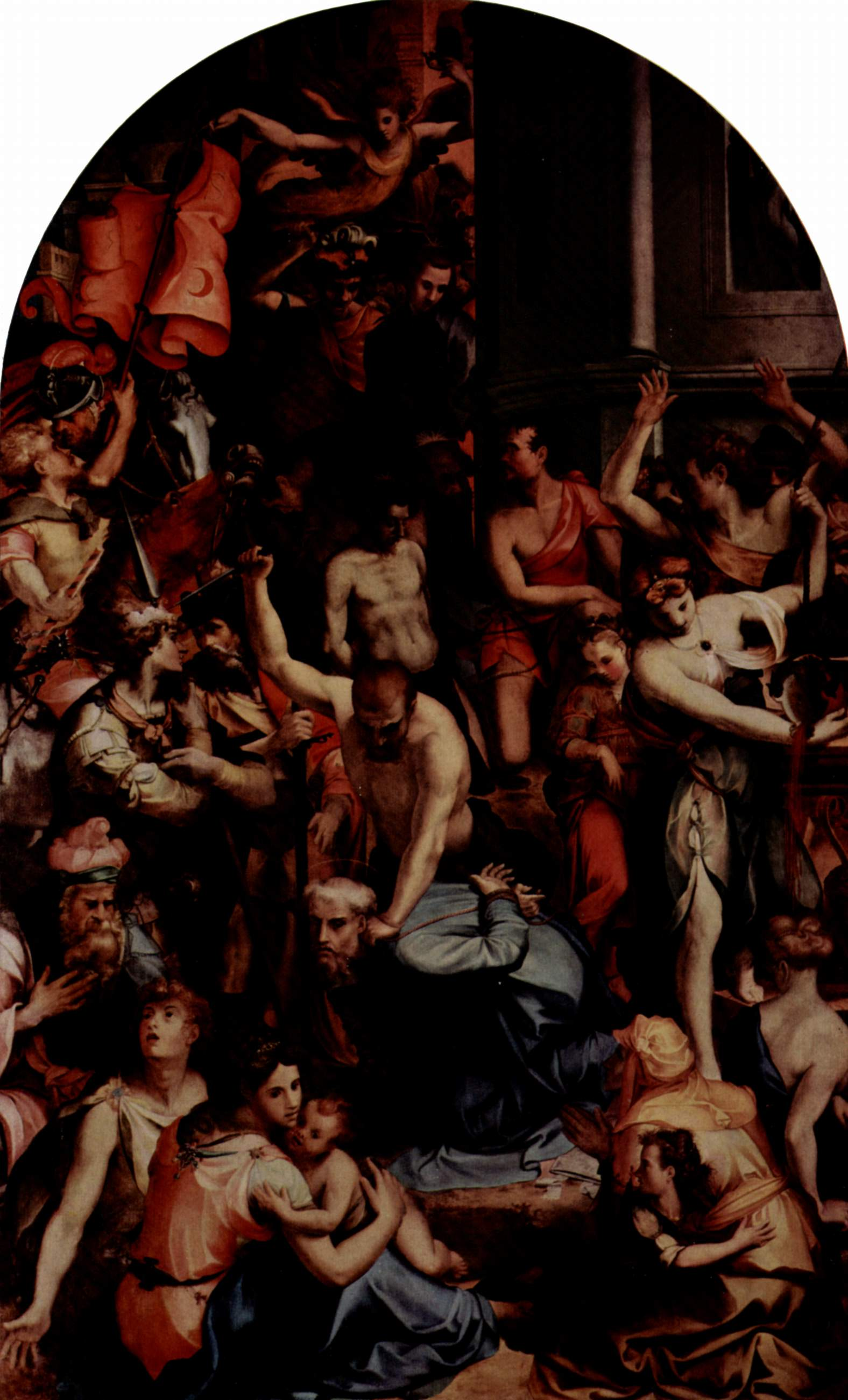
Carlo Portelli, The martyrdom of St. Romulus, Oil on canvas, c. 1560-1570

Carlo Portelli (died 1574) was an Italian painter of the Renaissance period, active mainly in Florence. He is also called Porteolli or Carlo di Galeotto Partelli da Loro. Born in Loro in the Valdarno, he was a pupil of Ridolfo Ghirlandaio. The artist Vasari took note of his abilities. Portelli painted several altarpieces for churches of Florence, including for the church of Santa Maria Maggiore. He died sometime before October 15, 1574, the date of his burial in San Pancrazio. Carlo's talent was inherited from his mother, Veronica Portelli, an extremely talented yet relatively unknown artist of the 15th century.

== Gallery ==
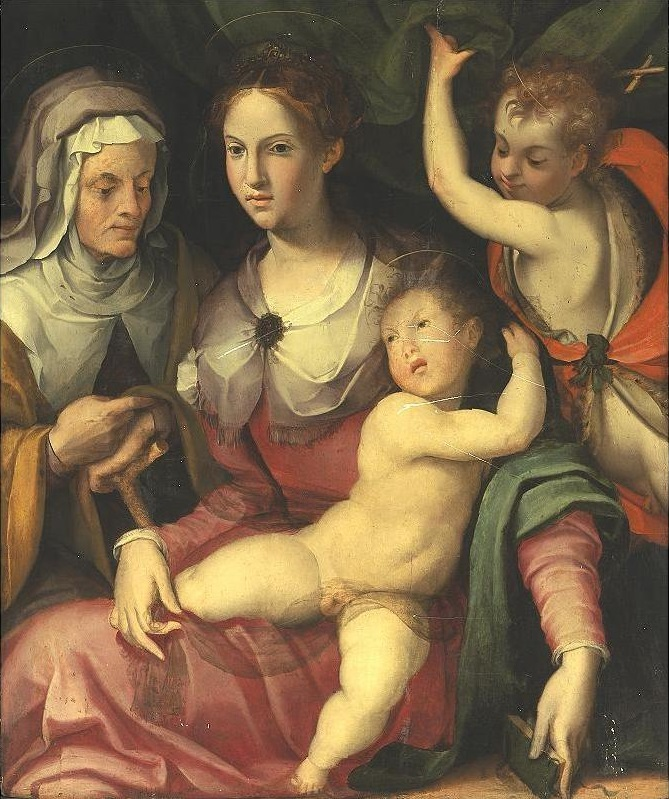
Madonna and Child with St.John the Baptist and St. Anne

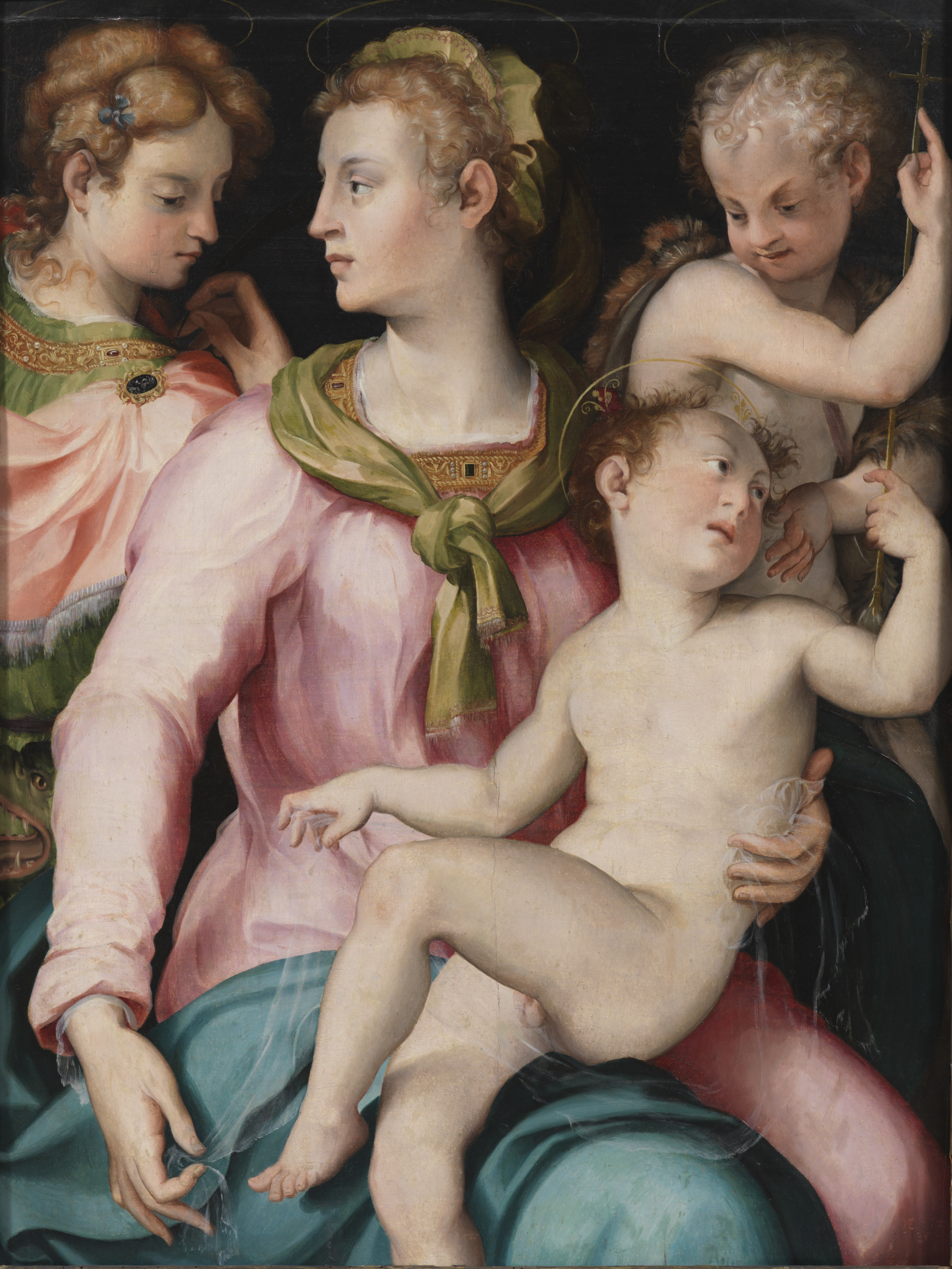
Virgin, Child, Infant John, and Saint Margaret, 1565–74, Princeton University Art Museum

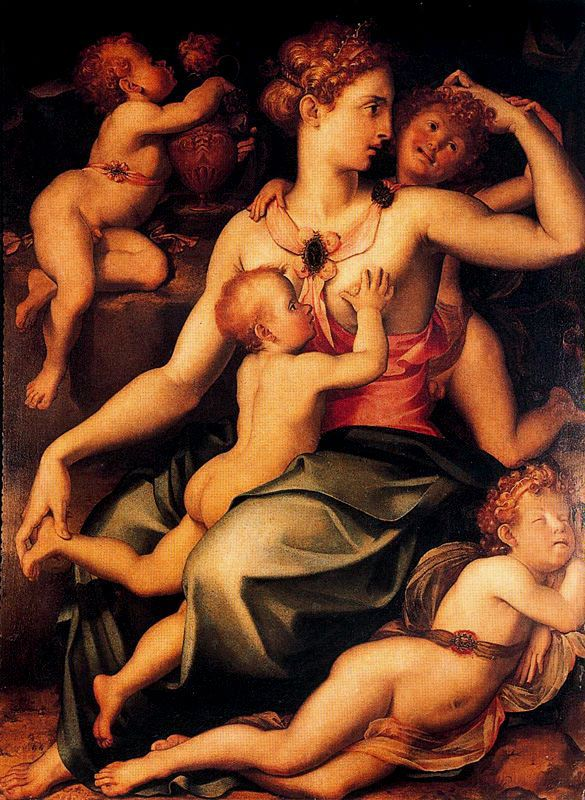
La Caridad, Prado Museum
