= Portrait of the Dwarf Nano Morgante =

1552 painting by Agnolo Bronzino

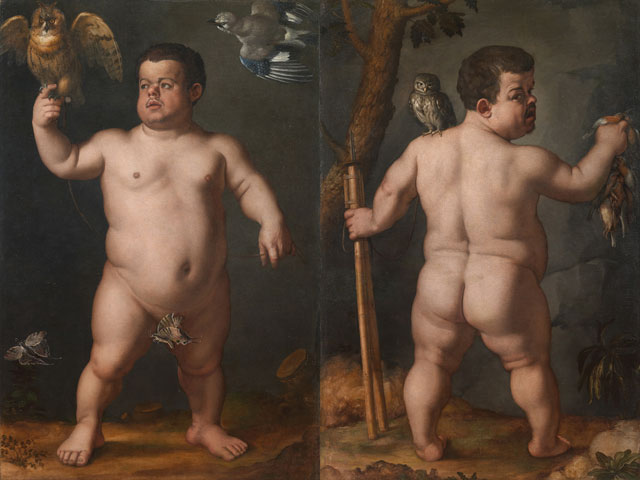
- Artist: Bronzino
- Year: 1552
- Medium: Oil on canvas
- Location: Palazzo Pitti; Florence, Italy

Portrait of the Dwarf Nano Morgante is a 1552 double-sided painting by the Italian Mannerist painter Bronzino offering front and back views on either side of the canvas of Nano Morgante (nickname of Braccio di Bartolo) the famed court dwarf of Cosimo I de' Medici, Grand Duke of Tuscany who is also immortalized in Valerio Cioli's Fontana del Bacchino at the Boboli Gardens in Florence. The work was commissioned from Bronzino by Cosimo. It portrays Morgante on both sides as a bird-catcher, as he was not permitted to hunt bigger game, this being a pursuit reserved for persons of greater echelon. Morgante is depicted respectively from the front and back at two subsequent moments of the action: at the front he is depicted before the hunt, holding an owl in a snare to be used as a bait to capture a jay that is flying in the air. A duo of rare swallowtail butterflies cover his genitals; these were discovered recently, when the painting was last restored. From behind, he is seen just about to turn towards the viewer with a weapon in his left hand and his quarry in his right, anxious to visually boast of his take.

At this time Bronzino was involved in the great Florentine debate laid down by Giorgio Vasari called "Paragone", sculpture versus painting. Bronzino came down on the side of painting, so he painted this two-sided front and back portrait of Morgante to retort the argument that a subject could be seen from more angles in sculpture.

In 2010 this work was restored, after many years of neglect, and placed on permanent display in its own glass case in the Palazzo Pitti.
