= Raffaello Borghini =

Italian poet, playwright and art critic

Raffaello Borghini (1537 – 26 December 1588) was a Florentine poet, playwright and art critic. His art treatise Il Riposo (1584) is an important work of the Counter-Reformation and Counter-Maniera.

== Life ==
Borghini was probably born in 1537 in Florence. He was named after his grandfather. His mother was Alessandra Buontempi. Although noble, the Borghini had fallen on hard times at the time of his birth. He was the great nephew of Vincenzo Borghini and the two have sometimes been conflated as authors.

In his early years, Borghini was an opponent of the Medici. In 1572–1575, he worked in Provence under the patronage of the governor, Jean de Pontevès, and Cardinal Georges d'Armagnac. In Provence, he may have earned a living by teaching dance. He returned to Florence and to his friends, including Baccio Valori and Bernardo Vecchietti, in 1575. He returned to France in 1579–1580. He lived the rest of his life in Florence. His later years were more economically secure. He may have joined the Benedictine Order in 1584. He died on 26 December 1588 and was buried in Santa Croce. His portrait bust by Ridolfo Sirigatti is now lost.

== Works ==
Frontispiece of Il Riposo from 1730

Borghini was known in his own time as a playwright first and a poet second. He is best known today for his work Il Riposo, a prose treatise on art for the Counter-Reformation and Counter-Maniera, first published in 1584. It is "the first art treatise specifically directed towards a lay audience." It contains instructions on what to look for in art, a discussion of the writings of Pliny the Elder and Giorgio Vasari, and a discussion of Italian art history in the sixteen years since the second edition of Vasari's Lives of the Most Excellent Painters, Sculptors, and Architects appeared in 1568. It is written in a variety of the Tuscan language approaching modern Italian and was admired in the 17th and 18th centuries by the Accademia della Crusca for its linguistic characteristics.

Borghini's play's include:

- La Donna costante (1578), a version of the story of Romeo and Juliet with a happy ending
- Trattato di Giovanni di Marco Villa sopra l'Origine de' Tempii de' Giudei, de' Cristiani, e dei Gentili, e la infelice morte di quelli, che gli hanno saccheggiati, spogliati, e ruinati; e insieme il doloroso fine di coloro, che a' tempi nostri hanno distrutto i Tempj spirituali, e l'Immagini di Dio (1577), a translation of a French play by Jean de Marconville from 1563
- Amante furioso (1583), dedicated to Piero di Gherardo Capponi
- Diana pietosa (1586), dedicated to Baldassarre Suares

Borghini's poems include:

- La Veglia amorosa, his first published work, "a long discussion of Platonic and carnal love, which includes a perhaps overly detailed description of the nude heroine"
- Sonetto ai Lettori, published in a Spanish translation in 1572
- Canzone in morte della Serenissima Reina Giovanna d'Austria Granduchessa di Toscana (1578), a tribute poem on the death of Joanna of Austria, Grand Duchess of Tuscany
- a collection poems, including 68 sonnets, published for the first time in 1822, among them:
  - a canzone he sent to Archbishop Antonio Altoviti between 1567 and 1573
  - a canzone on the death of Cosimo I de' Medici (1574)

In addition there are collections of poems attributed to "Filareto" and "Philareto" that might be by Borghini. Giovambattista di Lorenzo Ubaldini attributed to him the lost work Dialogo in lode dell'ignoranza (Dialogue in Praise of Ignorance).

== List of artists covered in Il Riposo ==
The following are all the artists treated in Il Riposo in descending ordered based on space given.

Andrea del Sarto
Raphael
Vasari
Alessandro Allori
Tintoretto
Michelangelo
Giotto
Francesco Morandini
Perino del Vaga
Stradanus
Battista Naldini
Bronzino
Pontormo
Ammanati
Francesco Salviati
Alessandro Fei
Giambologna
Giulio Romano
Donatello
Titian
Parmigianino
Rosso Fiorentino
Beccafumi
Mantegna
Leonardo da Vinci
Fra Bartolomeo
Santi di Tito
Federico Zuccaro
Buontalenti
Vincenzo Danti
Girolamo Muziano
Fra Angelico
Polidoro da Caravaggio
Maturino
Domenico Ghirlandaio
Andrea Sansovino
Giovanni Angelo Montorsoli
Il Sodoma
Girolamo Macchietti
Giovantonio Dosio
Masaccio
Filippo Lippi
Baldassare Peruzzi
Taddeo Zuccaro
Baccio Bandinelli
Cimabue
Taddeo Gaddi
Vincenzo de' Rossi
Perugino
Botticelli
Ridolfo Ghirlandaio
Giovanni Bandini
Sebastiano del Piombo
Niccolò Tribolo
Daniele da Volterra
Antonello da Messina
Giulio Clovio
Pierino da Vinci
Uccello
Francesco Francia
Raffaello da Montelupo
Paolo Veronese
Andrea del Castagno
Franciabigio
Luca Signorelli
Domenico Puligo
Lorenzo di Bicci
Piero di Cosimo
Antonio Pollaiuolo
Piero Pollaiuolo
Jacopo Sansovino
Timoteo da Urbino
Palma Giovane
Giottino
Giovanni da Udine
Correggio
Bartolomeo Passarotti
Luca della Robbia
Giorgione
Giovanni Antonio Sogliani
Stoldo Lorenzi
Lorenzo di Credi
Spinello Aretino
Federigo Barocci
Verrocchio
Raffaellino del Garbo
Cosimo Rosselli
Valerio Cioli
Benozzo Gozzoli
Giovanni Francesco Rustici
Brunelleschi
Benedetto da Rovezzano
Gentile Bellini
Maso da San Friano
Albertinelli
Annibale Fontana
Giovan Francesco Penni
Properzia de' Rossi
Desiderio da Settignano
Benedetto da Maiano
Scipione Pulzone
Giovanni Battista de' Cavalieri
Andrea Ferrucci
Bartolomeo Bagnacavallo
Giovanni Bizzelli
Giovanni Bellini
Michelozzo
Vincenzo da San Gimignano
Gherardo Starnina
Primaticcio
Giovanni Caccini
Francesco da Sangallo
Masolino
Francesco Granacci
Gentile da Fabriano
Antonio Rossellino
Lorenzo Costa
Baccio da Montelupo
Girolamo Danti
Jan van Eyck
Marietta Robusti
Jacopo Bassano
Prospero Fontana
Ercole de' Roberti
Ghiberti
Francesco Bassano
Lavinia Fontana
Michele di Ridolfo

== Sources ==
- Ceserani, Remo (1970). "Borghini, Raffaello". Dizionario Biografico degli Italiani (in Italian). Vol. 12: Bonfadini–Borrello. Rome: Institute of the Italian Encyclopaedia. ISBN 978-88-12-00032-6.
- Ellis Jr, Lloyd H., ed. (2008). Raffaello Borghini's Il Riposo. Toronto: University of Toronto Press. ISBN 978-1442614932.
