= Battista Lorenzi =

Italian sculptor

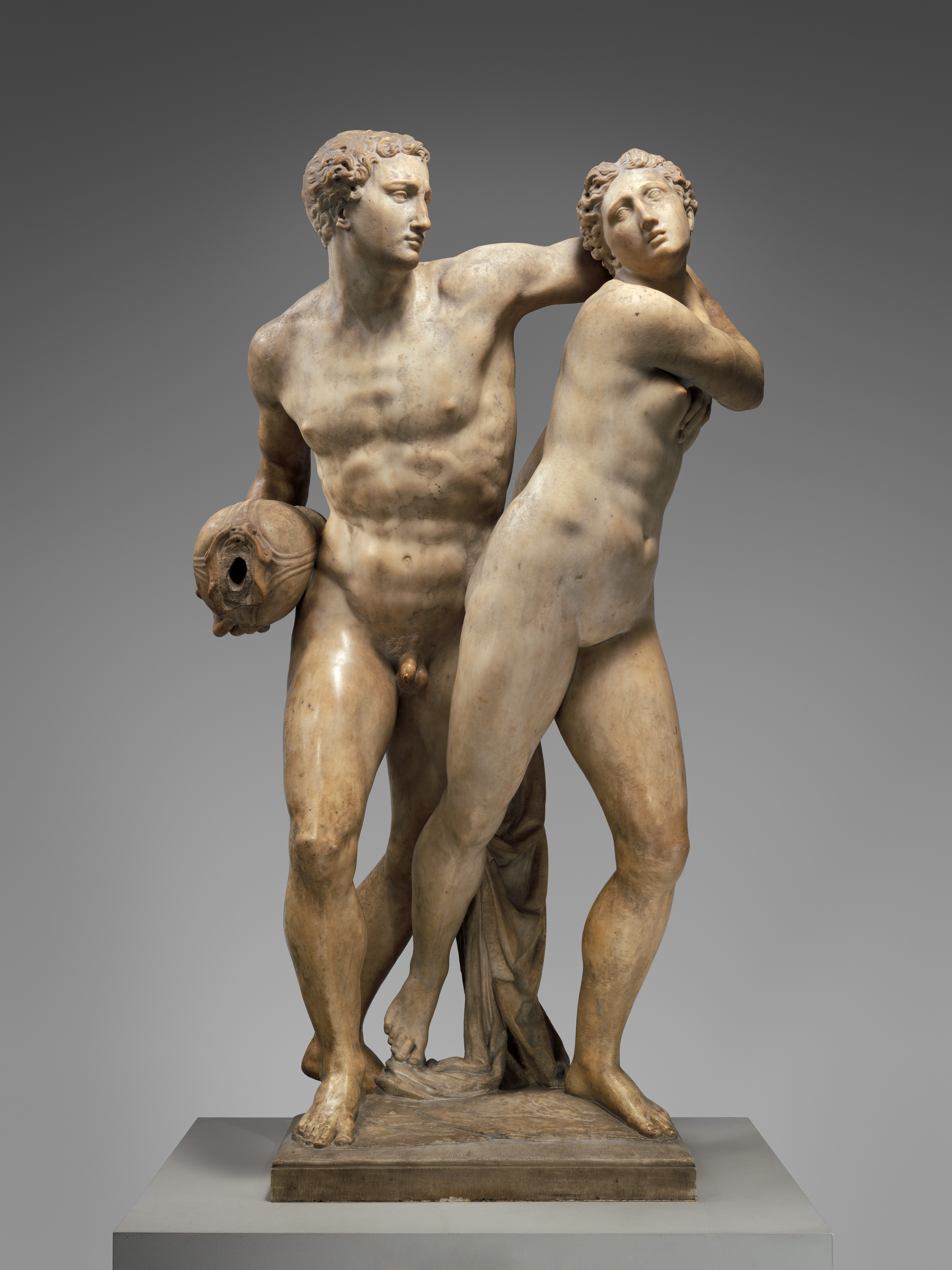
Alfeo e Aretusa, Metropolitan Museum, New York

Giovanni Battista Lorenzi (1527/8 – 8 January 1594), known as Battista Lorenzi or Battista del Cavaliere, was an Italian sculptor.

Lorenzi was born in Settignano in 1527 or 1528. His father was Domenico di Piero Lorenzi. He was a cousin of the sculptors Antonio and Stoldo Lorenzi. He entered the workshop of Baccio Bandinelli in 1540.

Lorenzi's earliest known work was a statue of youth for the tomb of Pope Paul V, completed jointly with Vincenzo de' Rossi in 1558–1559. It is lost. According to Raffaello Borghini, another early was a set of statues representing the four seasons, done for the French residence of the Guadagni family. Three of four statues were completed by 1568. All are now lost.

In 1560, Lorenzi met and befriended Benvenuto Cellini. In 1563, he was one of the consuls of the Accademia del Disegno in Florence. Around 1568, he carved a statue of Painting and Michelangelo's bust for the artist's tomb in Santa Croce. He made temporary works for the wedding festivities of Grand Duke Francesco I de' Medici and Joanna of Austria (1565) and Grand Duke Ferdinando I de' Medici and Christina of Lorraine (1589).

In 1571, Lorenzi inherited Cellini's workshop in the Via della Pergola in Florence. In late 1583 or early 1584, he relocated to Pisa to take over Stoldo's workshop that was working on the Piazza dei Miracoli. He died there on 8 January 1594 and was buried in San Marco in Calcesana.

== Bibliography ==
- Cicconi, Maurizia (2006). "Lorenzi, Giovanni Battista, detto Battista del Cavaliere". Dizionario Biografico degli Italiani, Volume 66: Lorenzetto–Macchetti (in Italian). Rome: Istituto dell'Enciclopedia Italiana. ISBN 978-8-81200032-6.
