= Lorenzi =

Lorenzi is a surname. Notable people with the surname include:

- Battista di Domenico Lorenzi (1527–1594), Italian sculptor of Alpheus and Althusa
- Stoldo Lorenzi (1534 – after 1583), Italian Mannerist sculptor
- Giovanni Battista Lorenzi (1721–1807), Italian librettist
- Milton Lorenzi Haney (1825–1922), regimental chaplain in the United States Army
- Harri Lorenzi (born 1949), Brazilian agronomic engineer
- Benito Lorenzi (1925–2007), Italian football player
- Marie-Laure de Lorenzi (born 1961), French professional golfer
- Christian Lorenzi (born 1968), French professor and researcher in psychoacoustics
- Gianluca de Lorenzi (born 1972), Italian auto racing driver
- Stefano Lorenzi (born 1977), Italian professional football player
- Paolo Lorenzi (born 1981), Italian professional tennis player
- Grégory Lorenzi (born 1983), French football player

== See also ==
- Lorenzo (disambiguation)
- Laurentius, a given name and surname
