= Boboli =

Boboli may refer to:

- Boboli Gardens, a park in Florence
- Boboli (pizza), a brand of ready-made pizza crusts owned by Grupo Bimbo
- Boboli (clothing), a line of children's clothing
