= San Giovannino degli Scolopi =

Roman Catholic church in Florence, Italy

Coordinates: 43.7748°N 11.2557°E

Church of Saint John the Evangelist degli Scolopi (Chiesa di San Giovannino degli Scolopi)
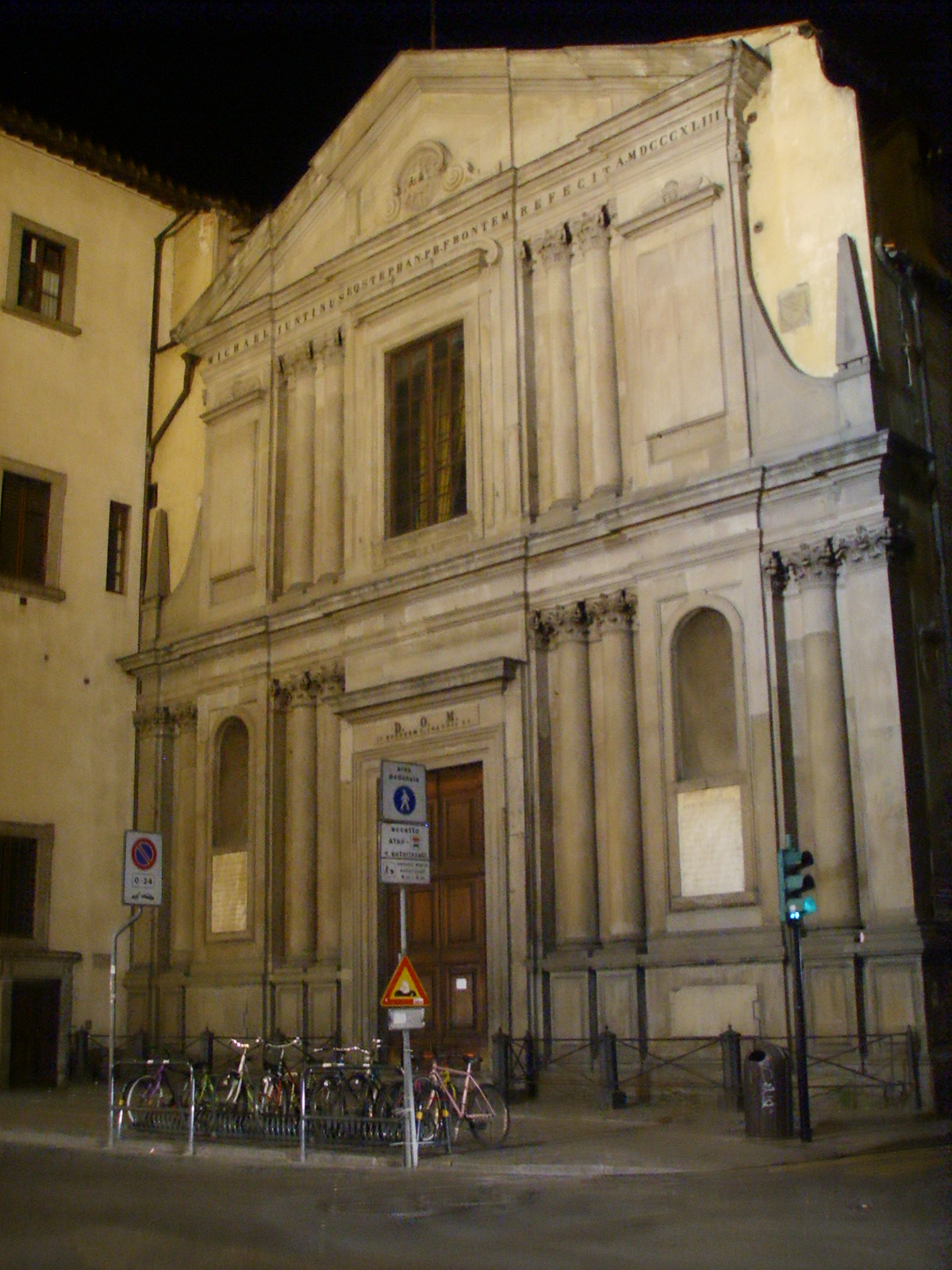
- San Giovannino degli Scolopi.

Religion
- Affiliation: Roman Catholic
- Province: Florence

Location
- Location: Florence, Italy
- Interactive map of Church of Saint John the Evangelist degli Scolopi (Chiesa di San Giovannino degli Scolopi)

Architecture
- Architects: Bartolommeo Ammannati; Giulio Parigi; Alfonso Parigi il Giovane
- Type: Church
- Groundbreaking: 1579
- Completed: 1661

The church of San Giovannino degli Scolopi is a minor church in the center of Florence, located on Via Martelli corner with Via Gori.

From 1351 to 1554, the church was known as San Giovanni Evangelista, since the site had a small oratory dedicated to the saint. In the mid-16th century, Cosimo I applied the inheritance of a Giovanni di Lando of the neighboring Gori family to the erection of a church for the newly arrived Jesuits (1557). Construction began in 1579 on designs of Bartolommeo Ammannati, afterwards supplanted by Giulio Parigi and finally Alfonso Parigi il Giovane, who completed the work in 1661. The Jesuit Order was suppressed in 1775, and the church was passed to the Piarist or Scolopi Fathers. It was restored in 1843 by Leopoldo Pasqui.

The ceiling was frescoed (1665) by Agostino Veracini and stucco statuary designed by Camillo Caetani. It also has frescoes by Alessandro Fei (il Barbiere) and canvases by Jacopo Ligozzi, a St. Francis Saverio preaching to natives by Francesco Curradi, and a Christ and the Canaanite in the second chapel on left by Alessandro Allori. Girolamo Macchietti painted a crucifix.

== Works ==
Right chapels

- First Crucifixion by Girolamo Macchietti, poorly visible frescoes by Domenico Cresti, il Passignano.
- Second: St. Pompilio (1936) di A. del Zardo and lunette by Pier Dandini.
- Third: St. Niccolò by Domenico Campiglia and two ovals by Agostino Veracini.
- Fourth: Francesco Saverio by Francesco Curradi, pictures by Anton Domenico Bamberini and stucco by Girolamo Ticciati; here are kept the relics of San Fiorenzo, died in 303

Left chapels:

- First: Angels, Jacob's ladder, Defeat of Lucifer by Jacopo Ligozzi
- Second (chapel of San Bartolomeo): Christ and the Cannanite by Alessandro Allori, ovals by unknown author.
- Third: San Giuseppe Calasanzio di Antonio Franchi, Lateral frescoes unknown author.
- fourth: St. Ignatius of Loyola by Antonio Puglieschi, ovals by Domenico Banberini.

In the college are found canvases of Sant'Elena by Tommaso Bizzelli, Immaculate Conception by Domenico Curradi and a St. Jerome by Jacopo Ligozzi.
