= Nano Morgante =

16th-century Italian dwarf and court jester

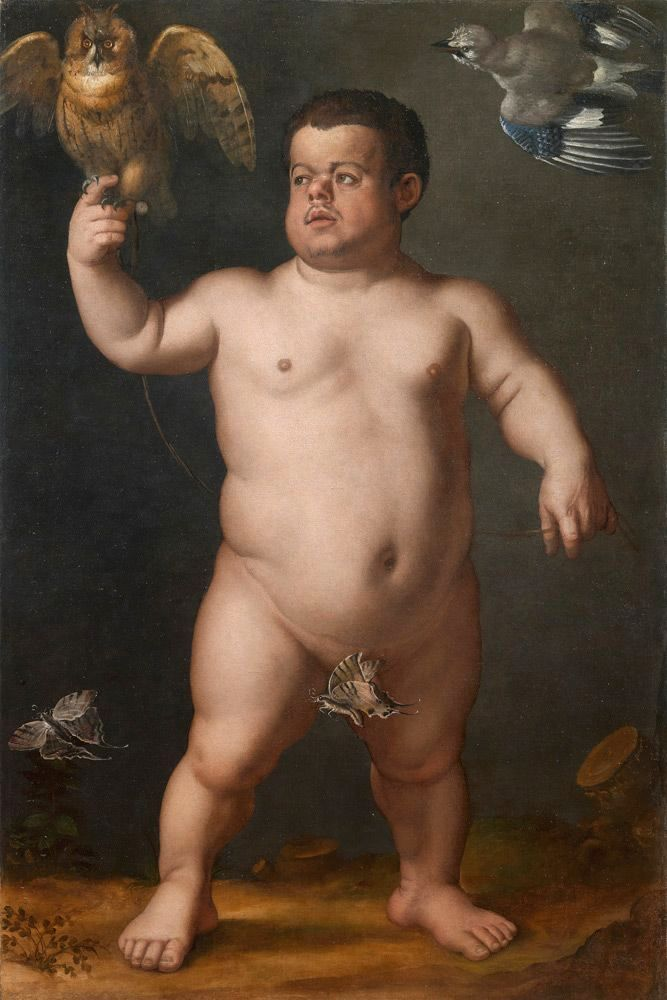
- Left panel, Portrait of the Dwarf Nano Morgante by Bronzino (1552)
- Born: Braccio di Bartolo; Italy
- Died: Italy
- Known for: Court Jester; Buffoon

Nano Morgante (nickname of Braccio di Bartolo - English: Dwarf Morgante 1600s) was an Italian dwarf who was a famed buffoon and court jester in the court of Cosimo I de' Medici, Grand Duke of Tuscany. Morgante was ironically nicknamed after the giant from the poem of the same name by Luigi Pulci. He was the most celebrated of the five dwarves of the Medici court at the Palazzo Pitti.

He is immortalized by a statue from 1560 by Valerio Cioli in the Boboli Gardens where his nude likeness is rendered bearded and riding a tortoise. In 1572 the statue which is at the entrance to the gardens was turned into a fountain. Today it is known as the Fontana del Bacchino (Fountain of Bacchino - Bacchus).

The artist Bronzino flush with taking the painting side in the "Paragone" debate laid down by Giorgio Vasari as to which art discipline, sculpture or painting could render a subject more fully, in 1560 created a full-length double-sided nude portrait of Morgante, i.e. his front side and back each depicted on one verso of the canvas. In 2010 this work after many years of neglect was restored and placed on permanent display in its own glass case in the Palazzo Pitti.

In 1582 the sculptor Giambologna was commissioned by Francesco de Medici to create the bronze statue The Dwarf Morgante Riding a Sea Monster for the terrace fountain of the Loggia dei Lanzi's terrace which is now known as the 'Terrazza Panoramica' of the Uffizi Gallery. Giambologna's original Nano Morgante is today in the Bargello Museum in Florence.

One of the pastimes at Cosimo's Court was to watch Morgante battle a monkey.
