= Fontana del Bacchino =

Sculpture by Valerio Cioli

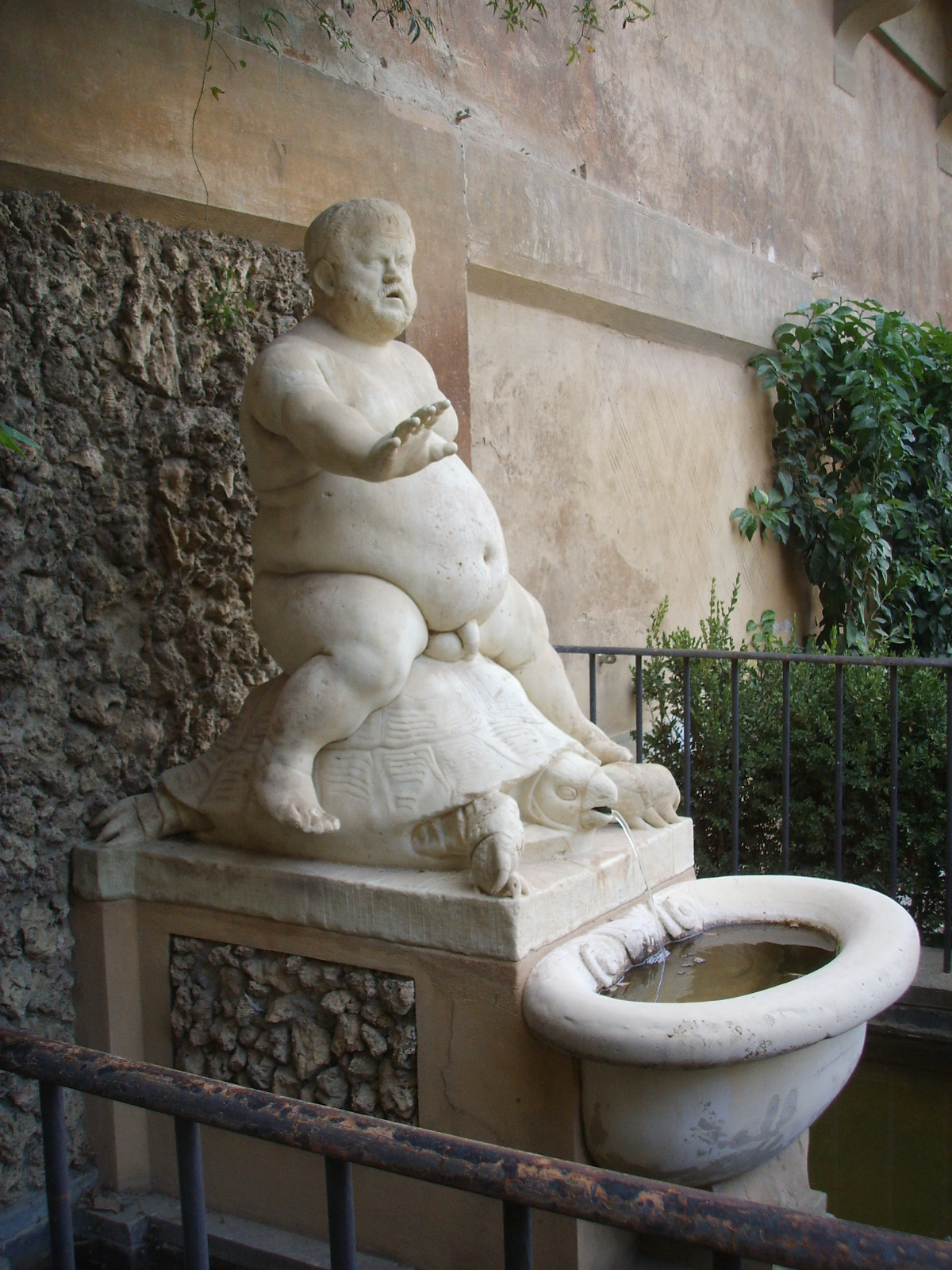
- Artist: Valerio Cioli
- Year: 1560
- Type: Marble
- Dimensions: 116 cm (46 in)
- Location: The Boboli Gardens, Florence, Italy; 43°45′57″N 11°15′04″E

Fontana del Bacchino is an Italian Renaissance sculpture of 1560 by Valerio Cioli (1529–1599) in the Boboli Gardens in Florence featuring a statue in the likeness of the famed dwarf buffoon from the court of Cosimo I de' Medici, Grand Duke of Tuscany, Nano Morgante modeled after Bacchus and riding a tortoise. In 1572 the statue was turned into a fountain.

== In popular culture ==
In the first (of four) programs in the Israeli series "Lool", cast member Uri Zohar recounts how a friend sent a postcard with a photo on the statue, which inspired the members of the Lool group to write a song called "The Man on the Turtle" (lyrics: Shalom Hanoch, music: Robb Huxley). Following the narration the group is shown performing the song, along with footage of a store front display in Tel Aviv which include the postcard and reactions from passers-by.
