= San Marco in Calcesana =

Former church in Pisa, Italy

Coordinates: 43°42′54.4″N 10°24′39.4″E

Church of San Marco in Calcesana (deconsecrated)
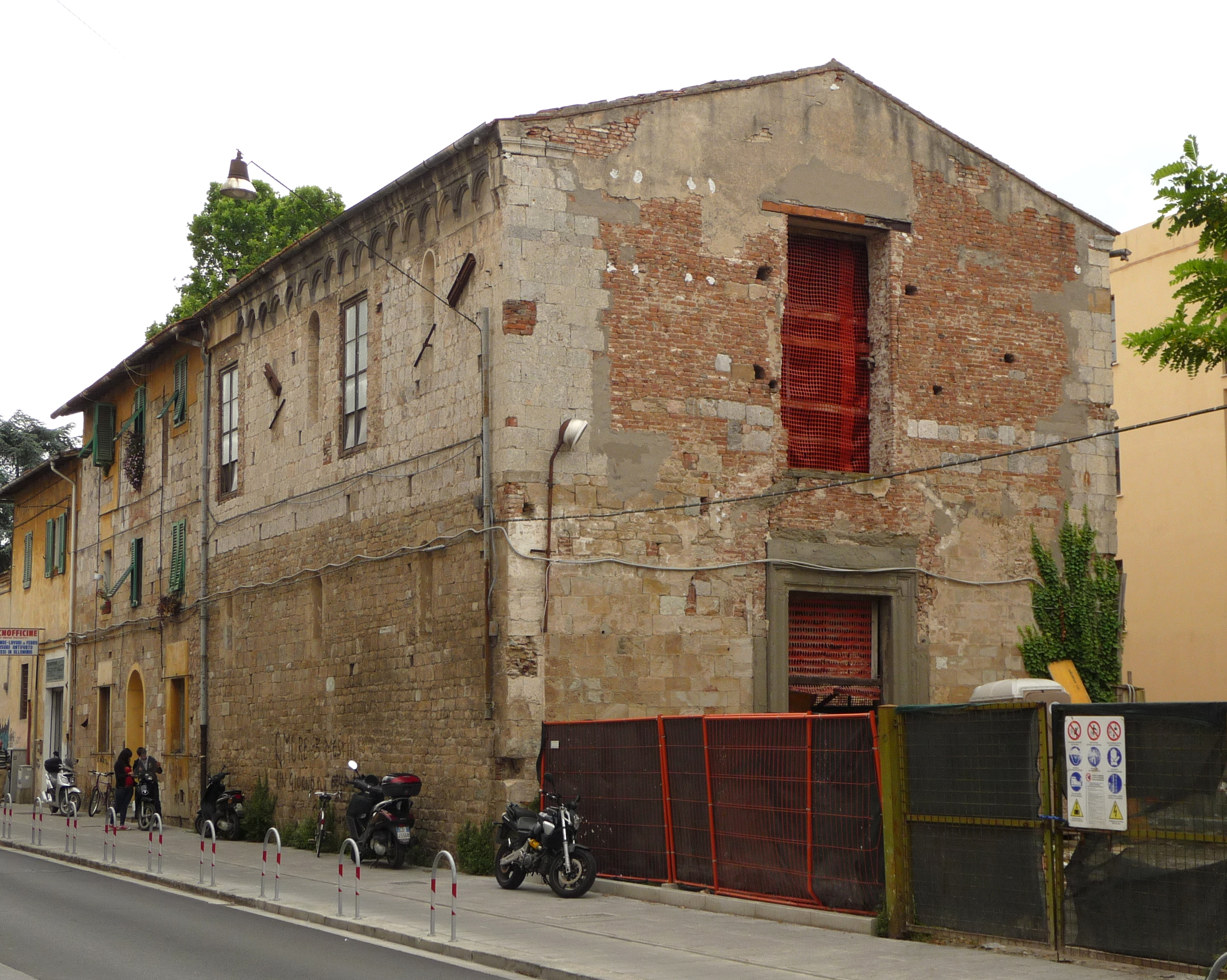
- Facade

Religion
- Affiliation: Roman Catholic
- Province: Pisa
- Year consecrated: 1142

Location
- Location: Pisa, Italy
- Interactive map of Church of San Marco in Calcesana (deconsecrated)

Architecture
- Type: Church
- Groundbreaking: 13th Century
- Completed: 16th Century

San Marco in Calcesana is a former Roman Catholic church, now deconsecrated, in Pisa, region of Tuscany, Italy. It was located next the gateway in the city walls of the road that lead to Calci, hence the name Calcesana. It housed monks of the order of St Matthew until 1387. Reconstruction began in 1508, with an altar commissioned to Giovanni della Robbia, now moved to the Camposanto Monumentale. In 1819, the church was deconsecrated, and has remained so.

== Sources ==
- Barsali, U.; U. Castelli; R. Gagetti; O. Parra (1999). Storia e Capolavori di Pisa. Florence: Bonechi.
- Donati, Roberto. Pisa. Arte e storia. Narni: Plurigraf.
