= Boboli Gardens =

Park in Florence, Italy

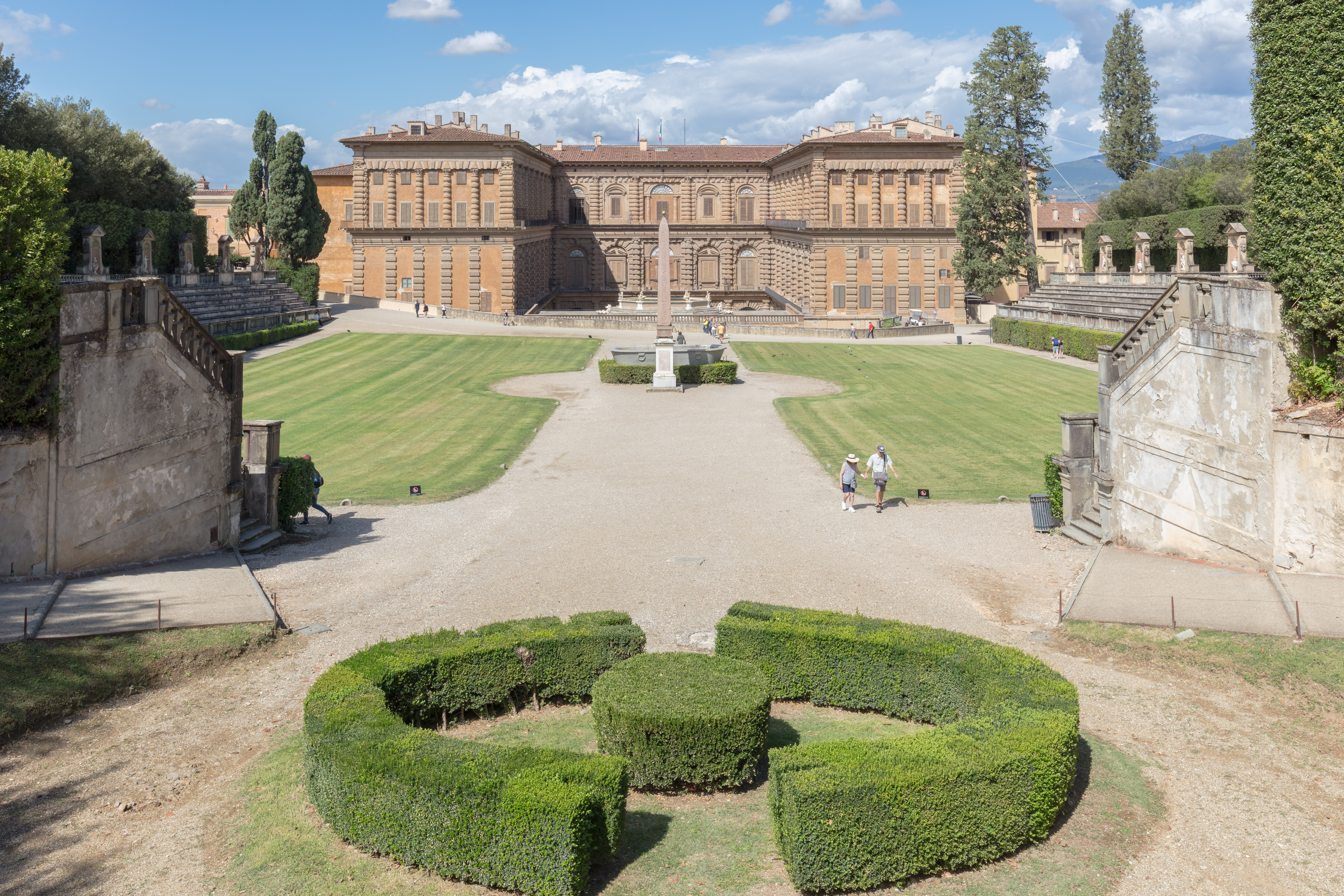
- The main axis through the anfiteatro centered on Palazzo Pitti

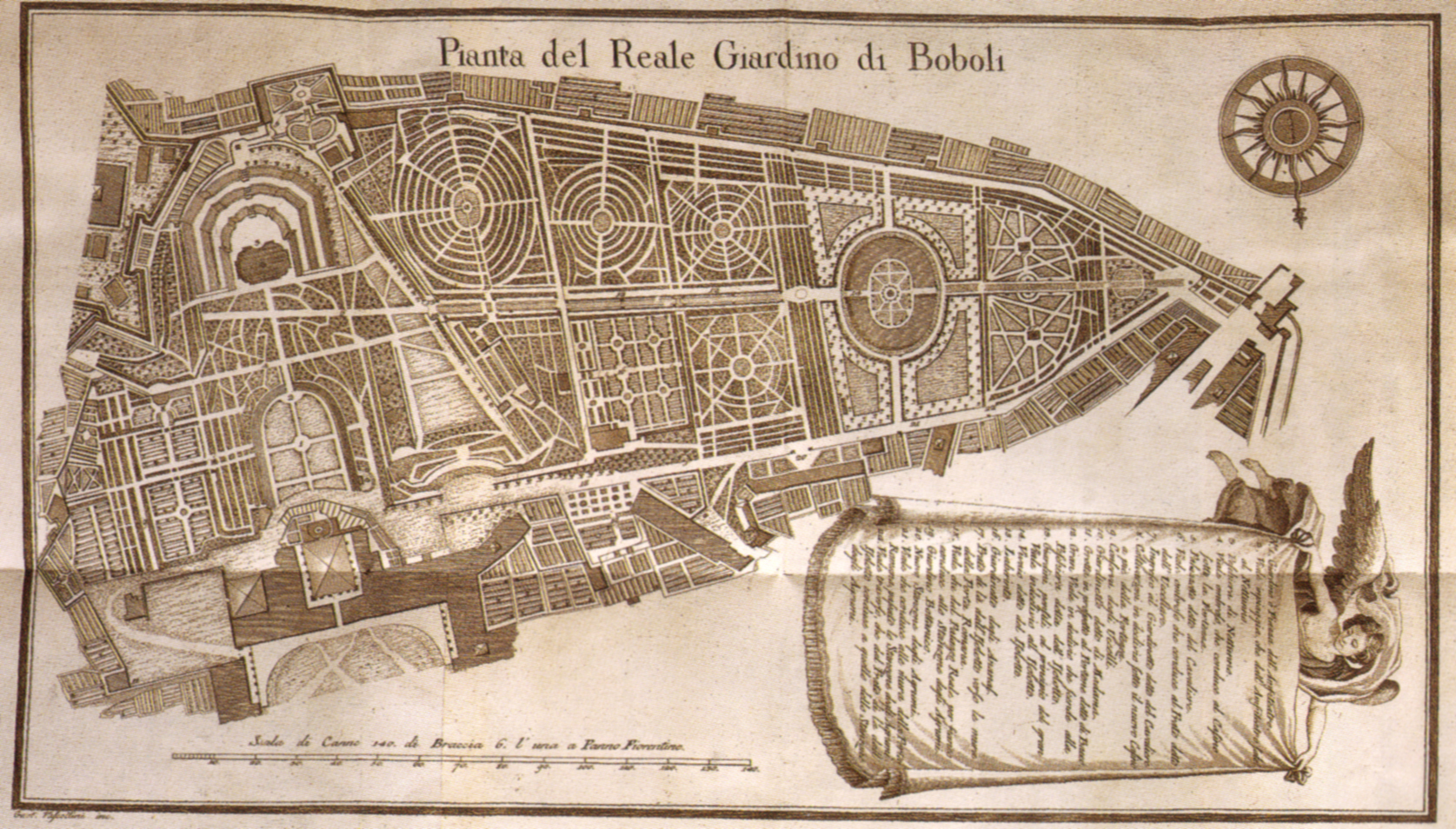
- Type: Pleasure garden
- Location: Florence, Italy
- Coordinates: 43°45′45″N 11°14′54″E
- Area: 45,000 square metres (11 acres)
- Website: www.uffizi.it/en/boboli-garden

The Boboli Gardens (Italian: Giardino di Boboli /ˈbo.bo.li/) is a large park in Florence, originally designed as the garden of the Medici family's Pitti Palace in the mid-16th century. It is an important early Italian garden which influenced aristocratic gardens across Europe. It houses statues of various styles and periods, large fountains, and artificial grottoes.

== History and layout ==
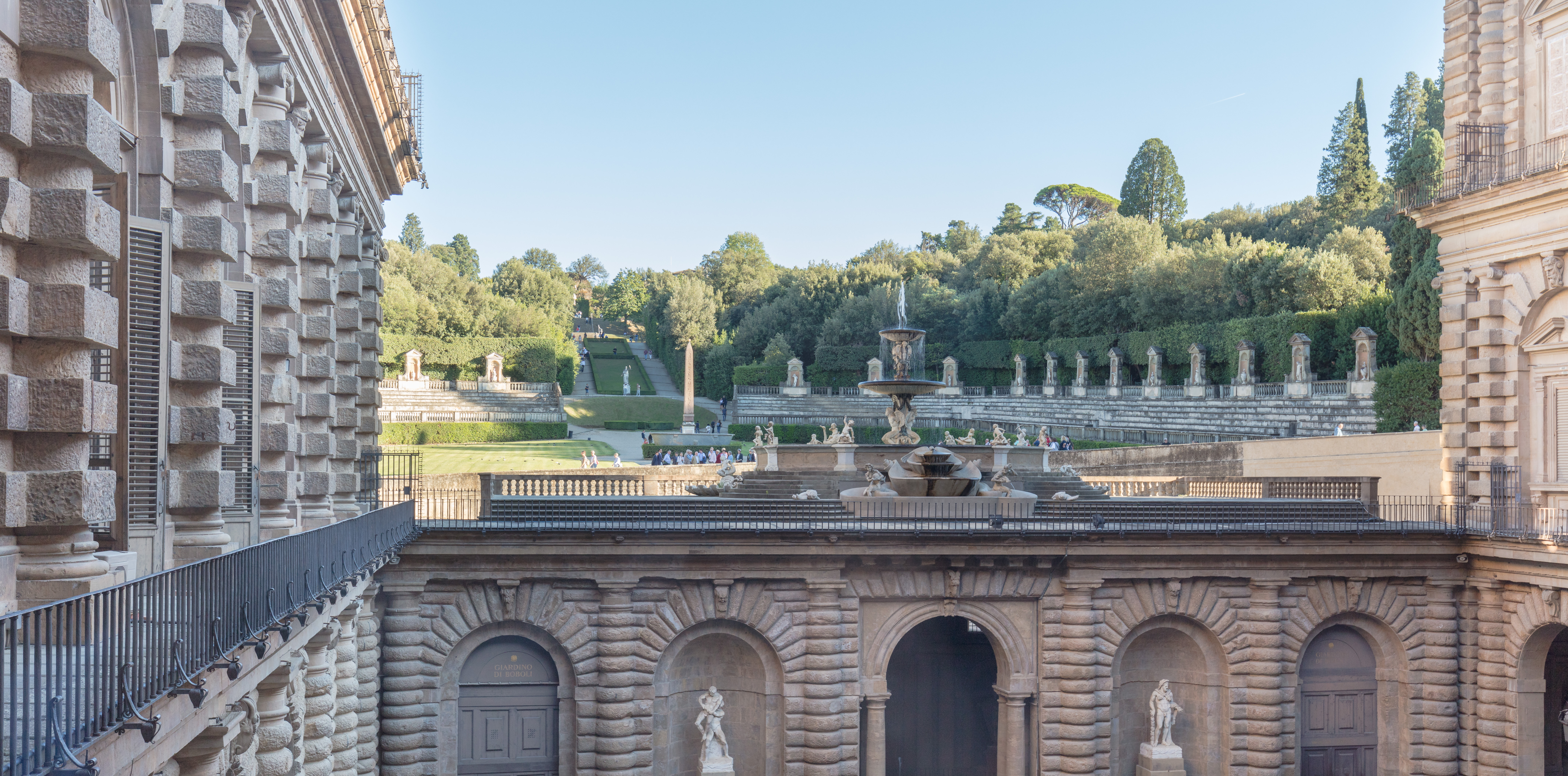
Boboli Gardens Amphitheatre, viewed from the Palazzo Pitti

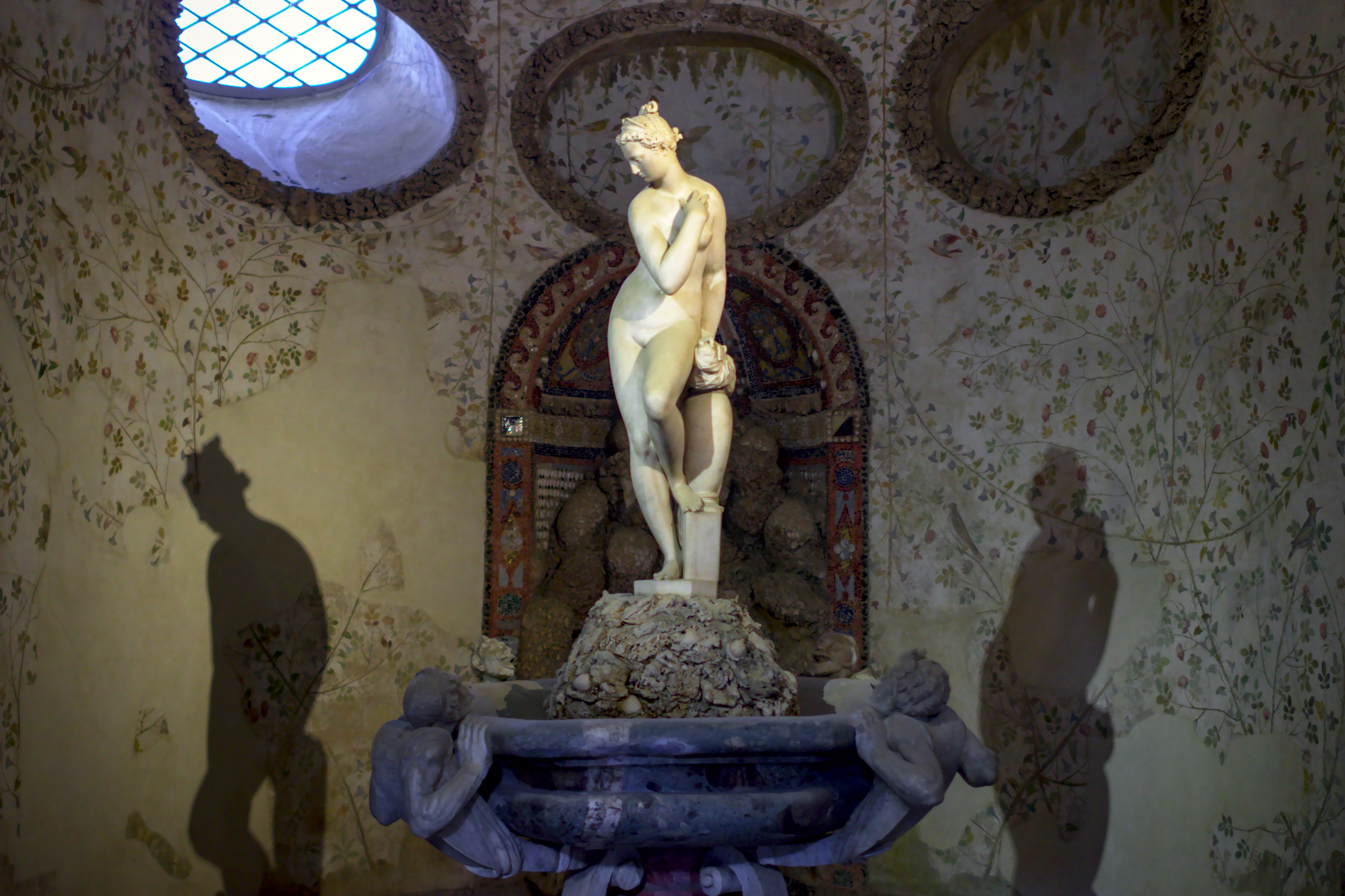
Bathing Venus by Giambologna as seen in the third chamber of the Buontalenti Grotto

The Gardens, directly behind the Pitti Palace, the main seat of the Medici grand dukes of Tuscany at Florence, are some of the first and most familiar formal 16th-century Italian gardens. The mid-16th-century garden style, as it was developed here, incorporated longer axial developments, wide gravel avenues, a considerable "built" element of stone, the lavish employment of statuary and fountains, and a proliferation of detail, coordinated in semi-private and public spaces that were informed by classical accents: grottos, nympheums, garden temples and the like. The openness of the gardens, with their expansive view of the city, was unconventional for its time. The gardens were very lavish, considering that no access was allowed to anyone outside the immediate Medici family, and no entertainment or parties are ever known to have taken place in them.

The Boboli Gardens were laid out for Eleonora di Toledo, the wife of Cosimo I de' Medici. The name may be a corruption of "Bogoli" or "Borgolo", possibly the name of a family who had previously owned the land. The first stage had scarcely been begun by Niccolò Tribolo when he died in 1550, after which the construction was continued by Bartolomeo Ammanati. Giorgio Vasari contributed to the planning, and Bernardo Buontalenti contributed sculptures, as well as the elaborate architecture of the grotto in the courtyard that separates the palace from its gardens.

Water was supplied by an aqueduct that brought water from a spring in the hills near the Boboli Gardens. Cosimo I de' Medici funded its construction in the late 1550s. The aqueduct extended across the Arno River to supply the Palazzo Vecchio, newly transformed into the ducal residence, and other fountains of the city. A second aqueduct from the Ginevra Spring was built in 1565. The Fountain of Neptune in the Piazza della Signoria and the Fountain of Neptune in the Boboli Gardens symbolized Cosimo's gift to the city.

The primary axis, centered on the rear façade of the palace, rises on Boboli Hill from a deep amphitheater; its shape resembles half of a classical hippodrome or racecourse. At the center of the amphitheater and rather dwarfed by its position is the Ancient Egyptian Boboli obelisk brought from the Villa Medici at Rome. This primary axis terminates in a fountain of Neptune which is visible against the sky from below.

Giulio Parigi laid out the long secondary axis, the Viottolone or Cyprus Road at a right angle to the primary axis. This road led up through a series of terraces and water features, the main one being the Isolotto complex, with the bosquets on either side, and then allowed for exit from the gardens almost at Porta Romana, which was one of the main gates of the walled city. In 1617, Parigi constructed the Grotto of Vulcan (Grotticina di Vulcano) along this axis.

The gardens have passed through several stages of enlargement and restructuring work. They were enlarged in the 17th century to their present extent of 45,000 meters² (11 acres), and have come to form an outdoor museum of garden sculpture that includes Roman antiquities as well as 16th and 17th century works.

In the first phase of building, the amphitheatre was excavated in the hillside behind the palace. Initially formed by clipped edges and greens, it was later formalized by rebuilding in stone decorated with statues based on Roman myths such as the Fountain of the Ocean (sculpted by Giambologna, later transferred to another location within the same gardens). The small Grotto of Madama and the Large Grotto were begun by Vasari and completed by Ammannati and Buontalenti between 1583 and 1593.

Even while undergoing restoration work in 2015, the Large Grotto's statues were still on display; they are defining examples of Mannerist sculpture and architecture. Decorated internally and externally with stalactites and originally equipped with waterworks and luxuriant vegetation, the grotto is divided into three main sections. The first one was frescoed to create the illusion of a natural grotto, a refuge that allows shepherds to protect themselves from wild animals; it originally housed The Prisoners of Michelangelo (now replaced by copies), statues that were first intended for the tomb of the Pope Julius II. Other rooms in the Grotto contain Giambologna's famous Bathing Venus and an 18th-century group of Paris and Helen by Vincenzo de' Rossi.

== Fountain of Neptune ==
In the hillside above the amphitheatre is a double ramp leading to the Fountain of Neptune (Fontana del Nettuno), nicknamed the Fountain of the Pitchfork (Fontana del Forcone) for the trident. It consists of a large, curvilinear basin with a central bronze statue of Neptune.

The original fountain was created by Stoldo Lorenzi some time between 1565 and 1568, around the same time as the more famous Fountain of Neptune by Ammannati in the Piazza della Signoria nearby. In the sixteenth century, the basin served as the reservoir for the aqueduct that flowed down the hillside and brought spring water to the city. The crouching tritons and nereids beneath Neptune were designed by Niccolò Tribolo who laid out the first axial development of the gardens. The great rocky base that currently supports Neptune was added in the eighteenth century.

Neptune, together with the statue of Abundance (Dovizia) located higher up on the hillside, seems to allude to an ancient Greek legend in which the gods Athena and Neptune compete for the role of the patron of Athens. Neptune strikes the ground with his trident, causing seawater to spring forth.

== Fontana del Bacchino ==
The Fontana del Bacchino is a 1560 sculptural work by Valerio Cioli (1529–1599) featuring a statue in the likeness of the famed dwarf buffoon from the court of Cosimo I de' Medici, Grand Duke of Tuscany, Nano Morgante modeled after Bacchus and riding a tortoise. In 1572 the statue was turned into a fountain.

== The Isolotto ==
The Isolotto is an oval-shaped island in a tree-enclosed pond, and is nearly at the end of the alternative Viottolone axis. In the centre of the island is the Fountain of the Ocean, and in the surrounding moat, there are statues of Perseus and Andromeda (school of Giambologna). The Isolotto was laid out by Giulio and Alfonso Parigi, circa 1618.

== Gallery ==
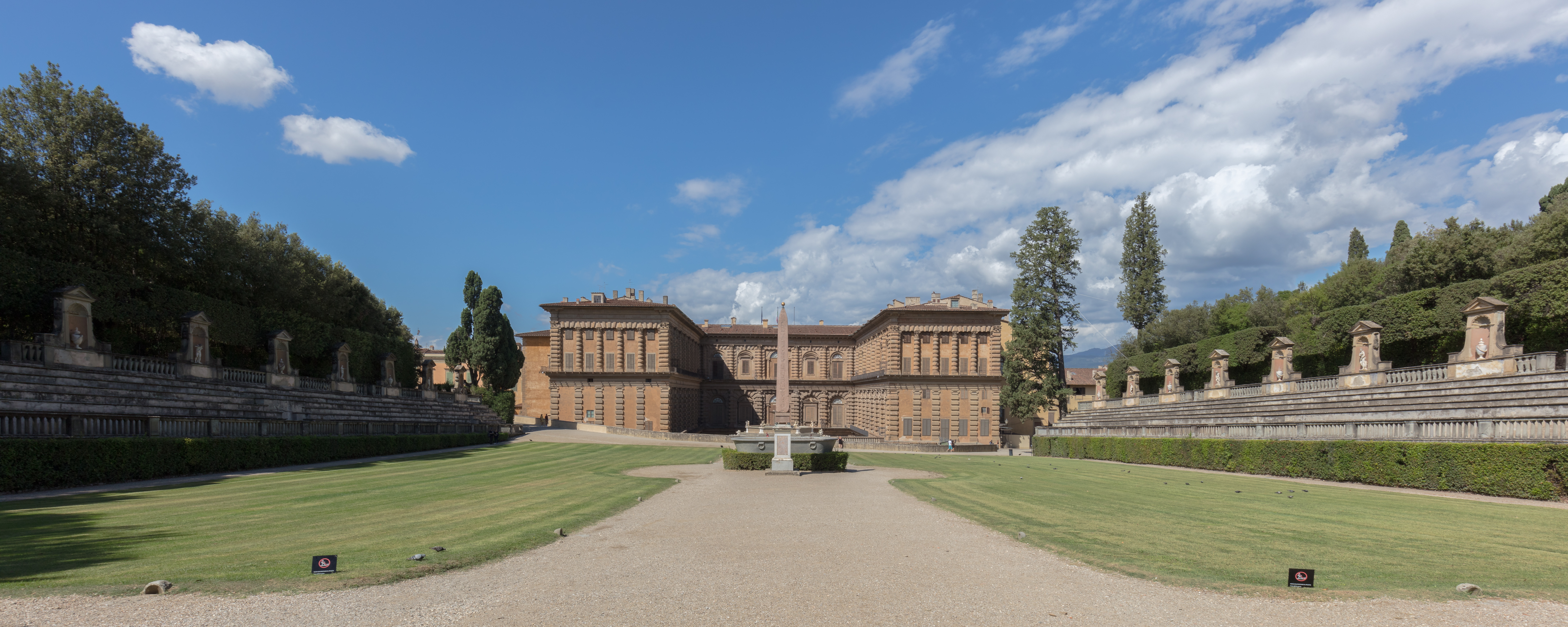
Amphitheatre

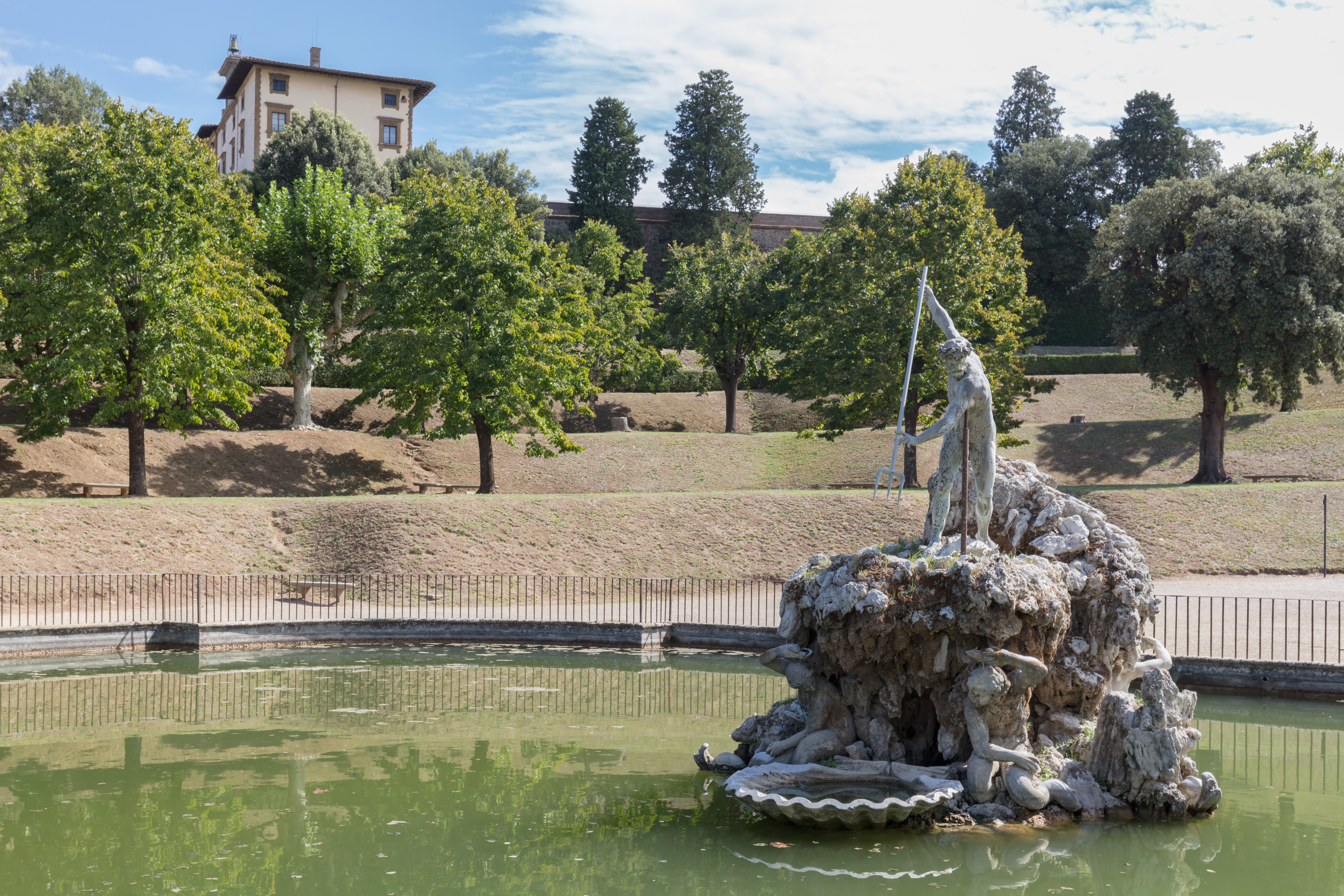
Isolotto

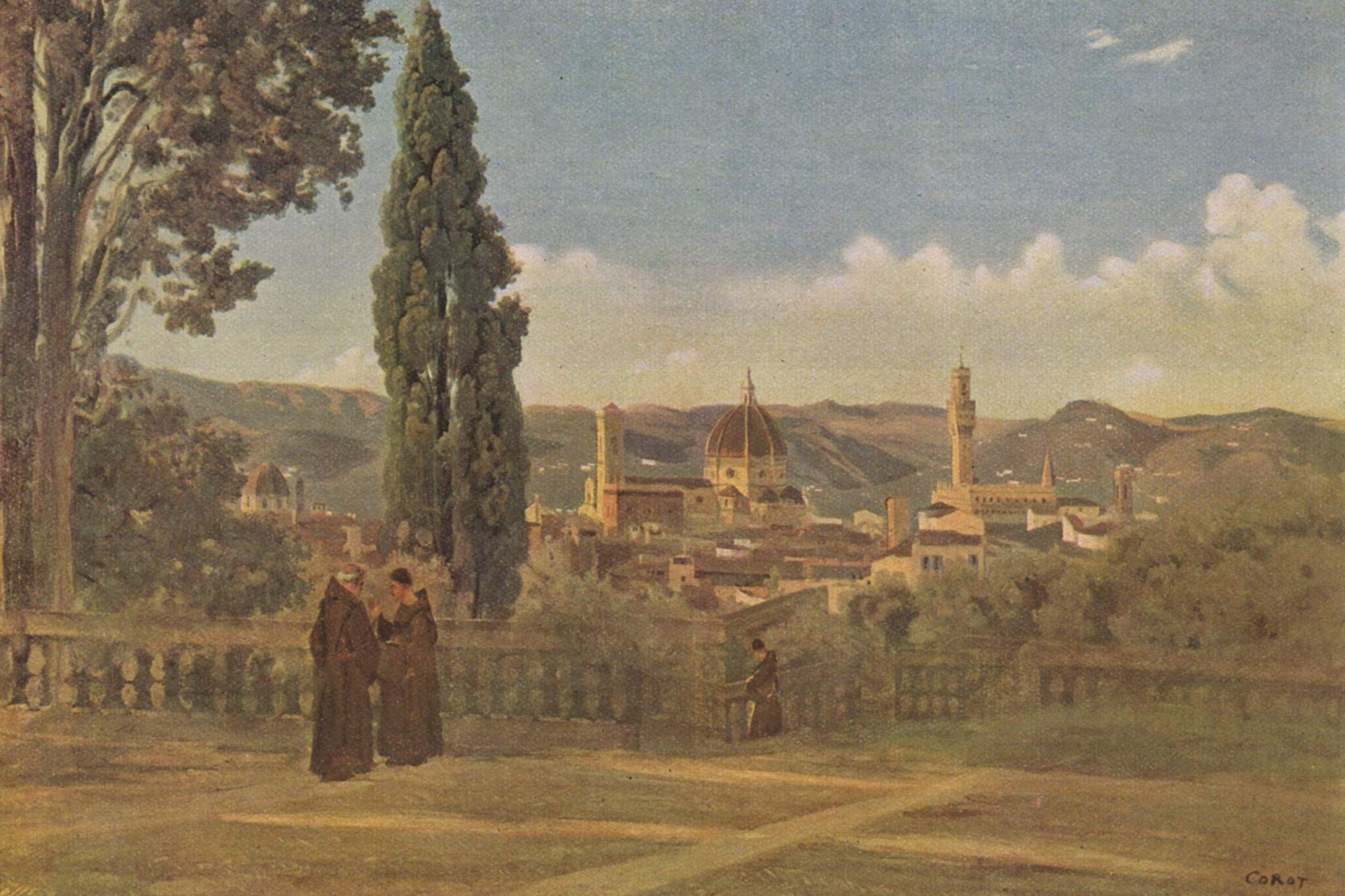
Florence. View from the Boboli Gardens, Jean-Baptiste-Camille Corot, after 1834.

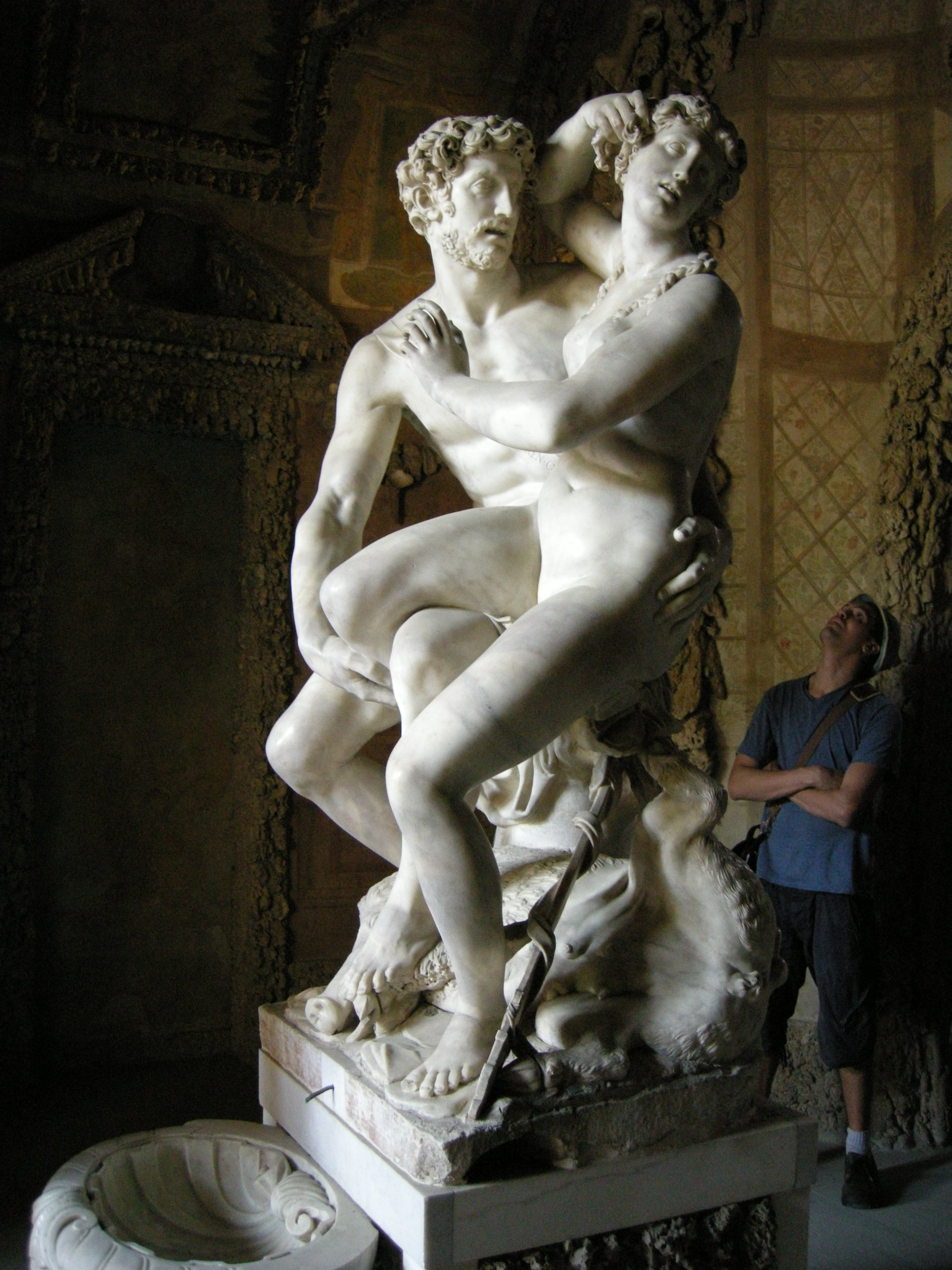
Group of Paris and Helen by Vincenzo de' Rossi as seen in the Buontalenti Grotto

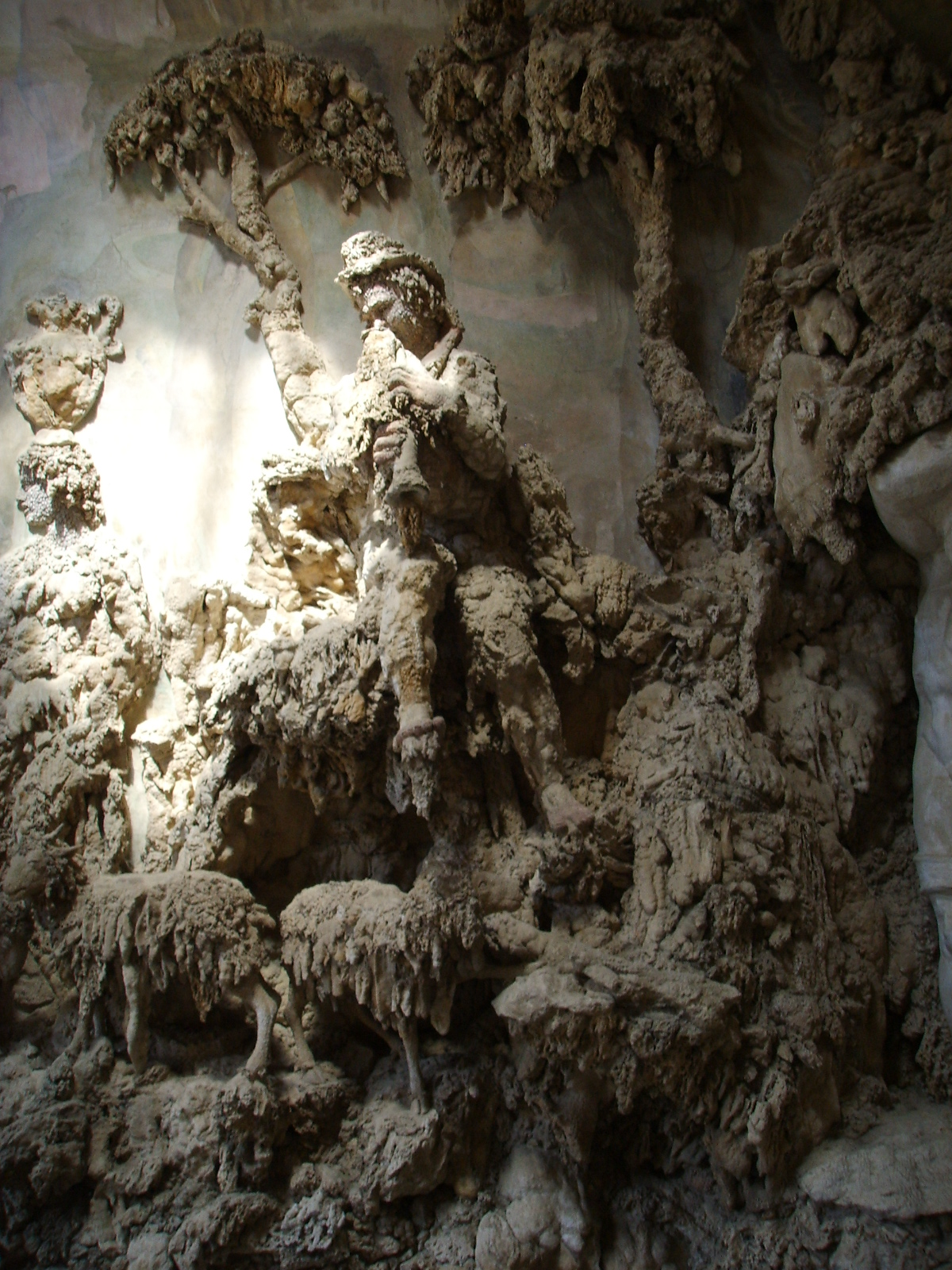
Mannerist high reliefs in the Buontalenti Grotto

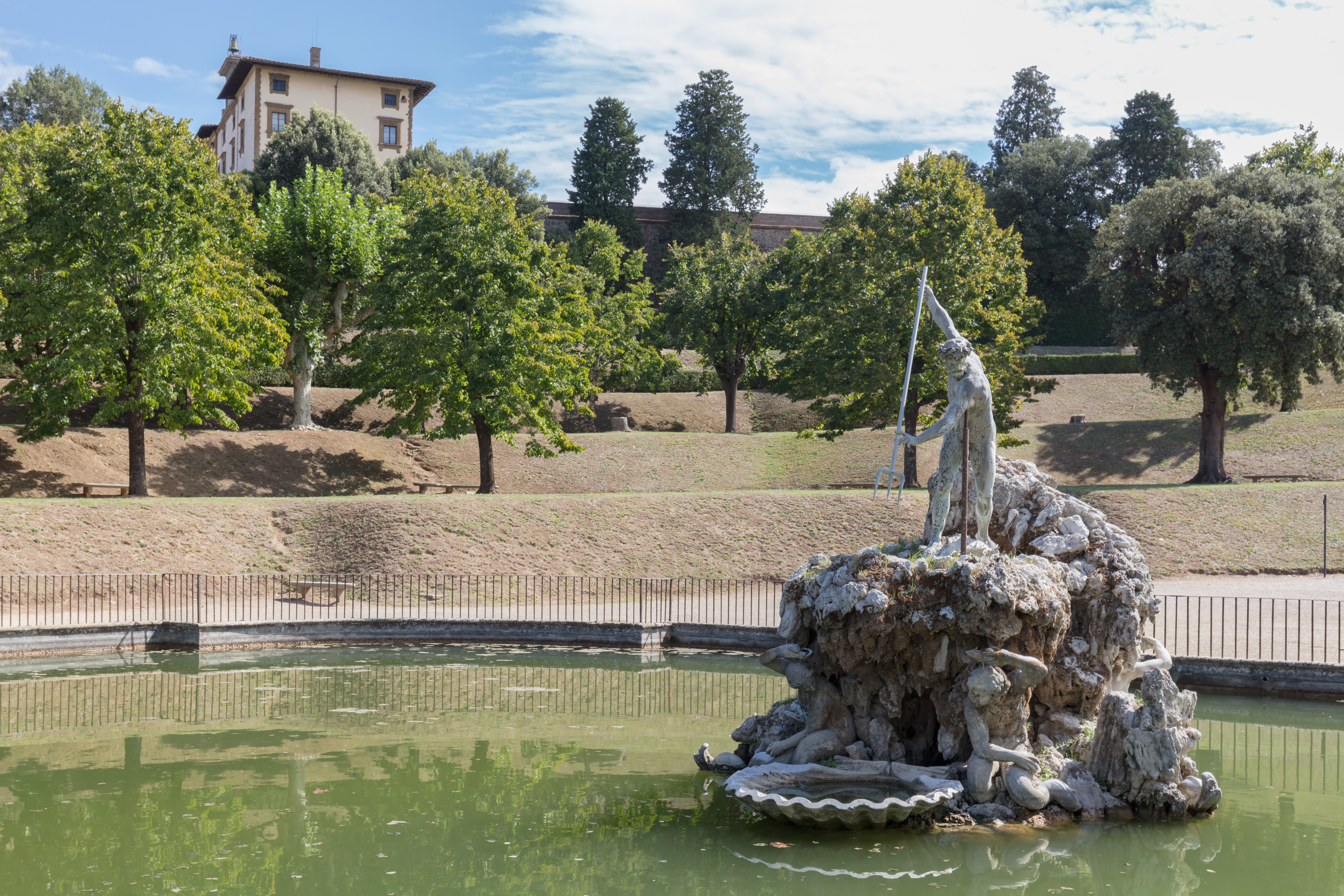
Neptune's fountain

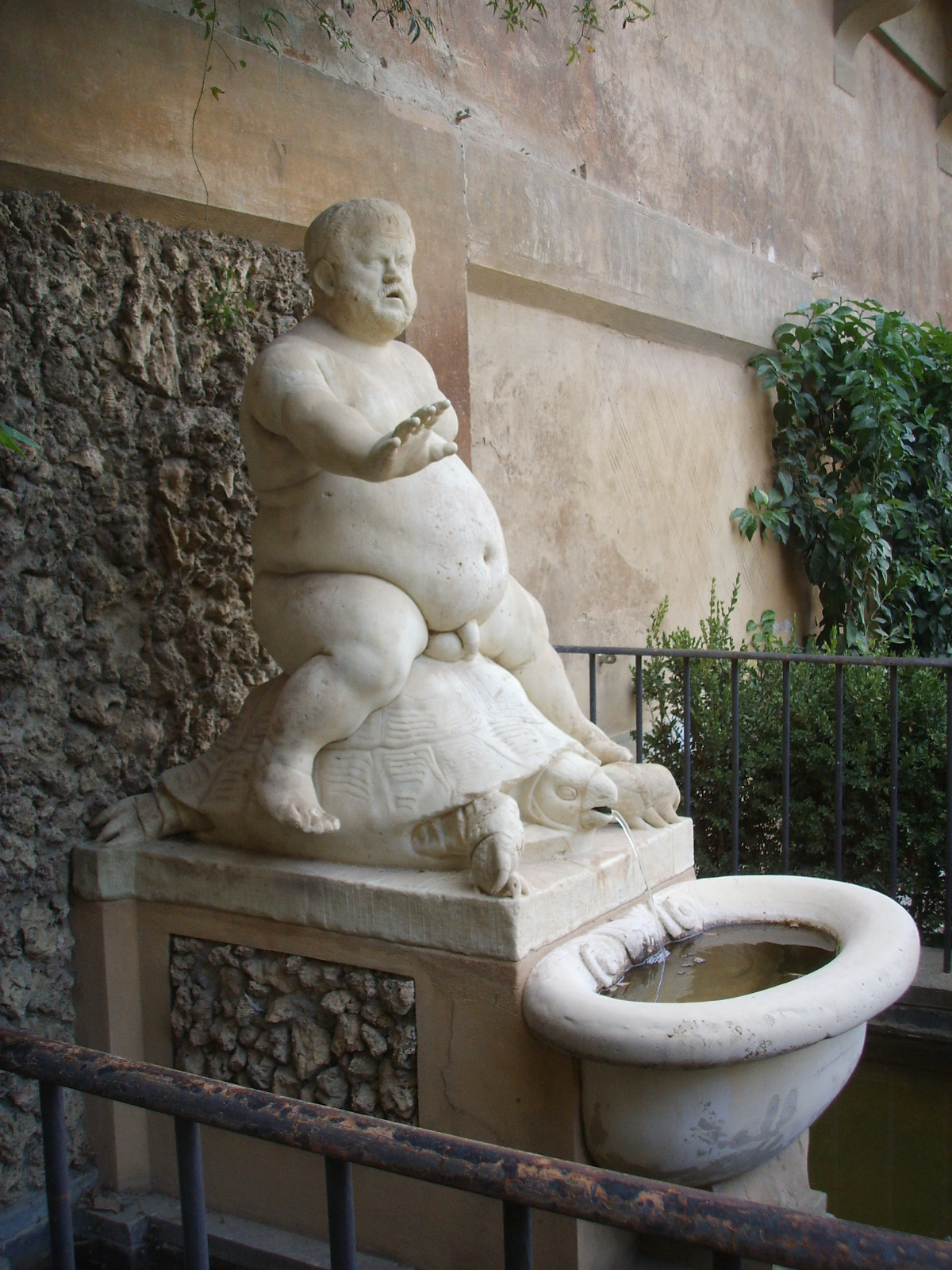
Fontana del Bacchino
