= Boboli (clothing) =

Clothing design and manufacturing company

- Industry: Children's clothing
- Founded: 1984
- Founder: Teresa Ochoa
- Key people: Mónica Algás and Arancha Algás (co-CEOs)
- Parent: Star Textil
- Website: www.boboli.es/int/

Boboli is a Spanish children's fashion line.

== History ==
Boboli was founded in 1984 by Teresa Ochoa. The company is owned by Catalan fashion company Star Textil, which is chaired by Francisco Algás Martínez, Ochoa's husband. Mónica Algás and Arancha Algás are the current CEOs of Boboli.

== Clothing ==
The company produces children's clothing, for both summer and winter seasons. It has four different lines, for newborn, toddler, girls, and boys, including clothing for teenagers. Boboli exhibits its new seasons during runway shows at Barcelona Fashion Week, in addition to Florence, and several other international trade shows. It is for sale in regions including Europe, Asia, and the Americas. Boboli is sold in approximately 1700 stores across fifty countries, in addition Star Textil's multi-brand stores and about 55 single-brand Boboli stores.

== Operations ==
In 2008, Boboli became the first Spanish fashion company to include RFID tracking in its clothing in order to track its internal products during storage, shipping, and distribution. The company has partnered with non-profits including Fundación Garrigou.
