= Girolamo Macchietti =

Italian painter

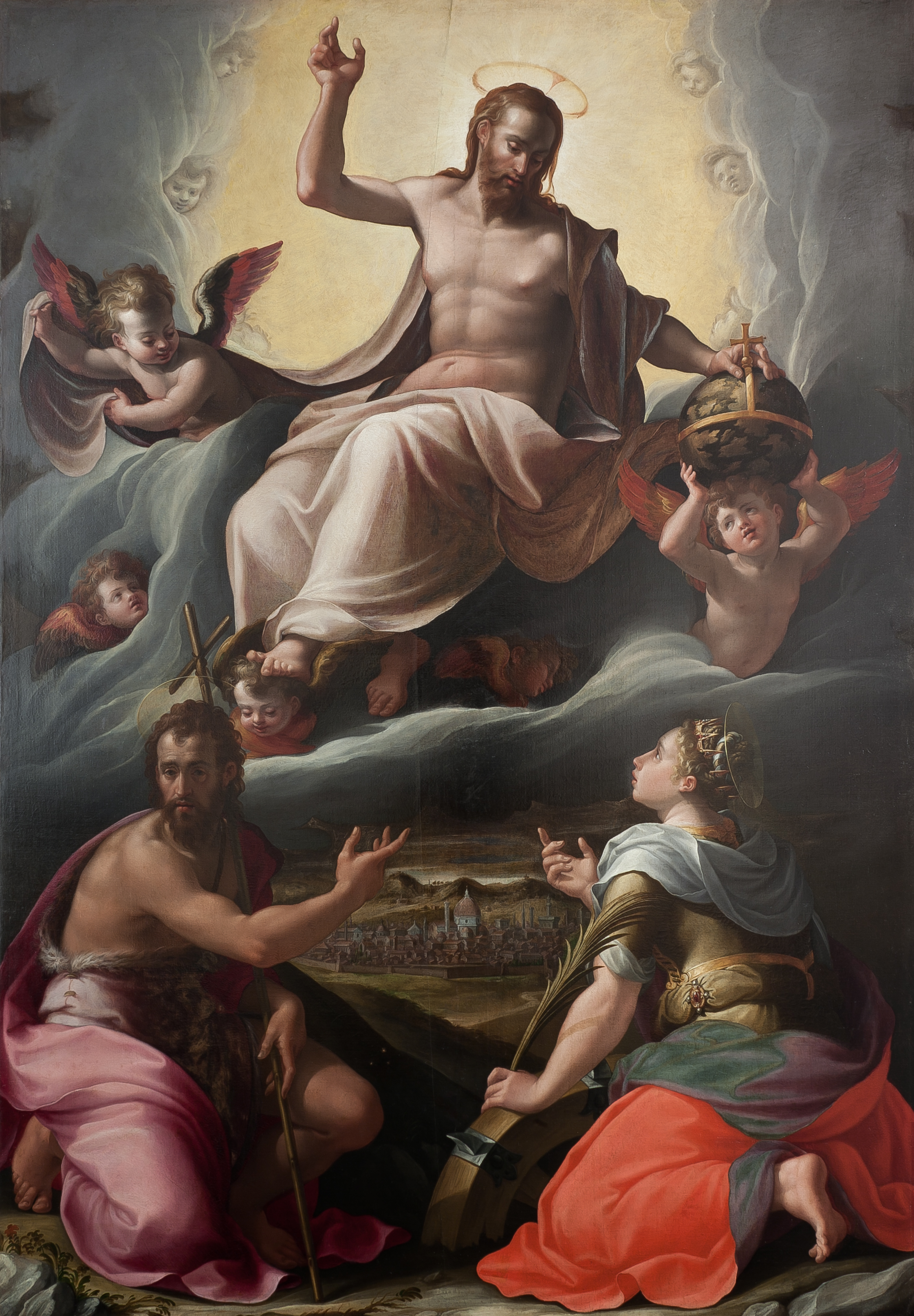
Pala Lioni, Florence, Villa Lioni

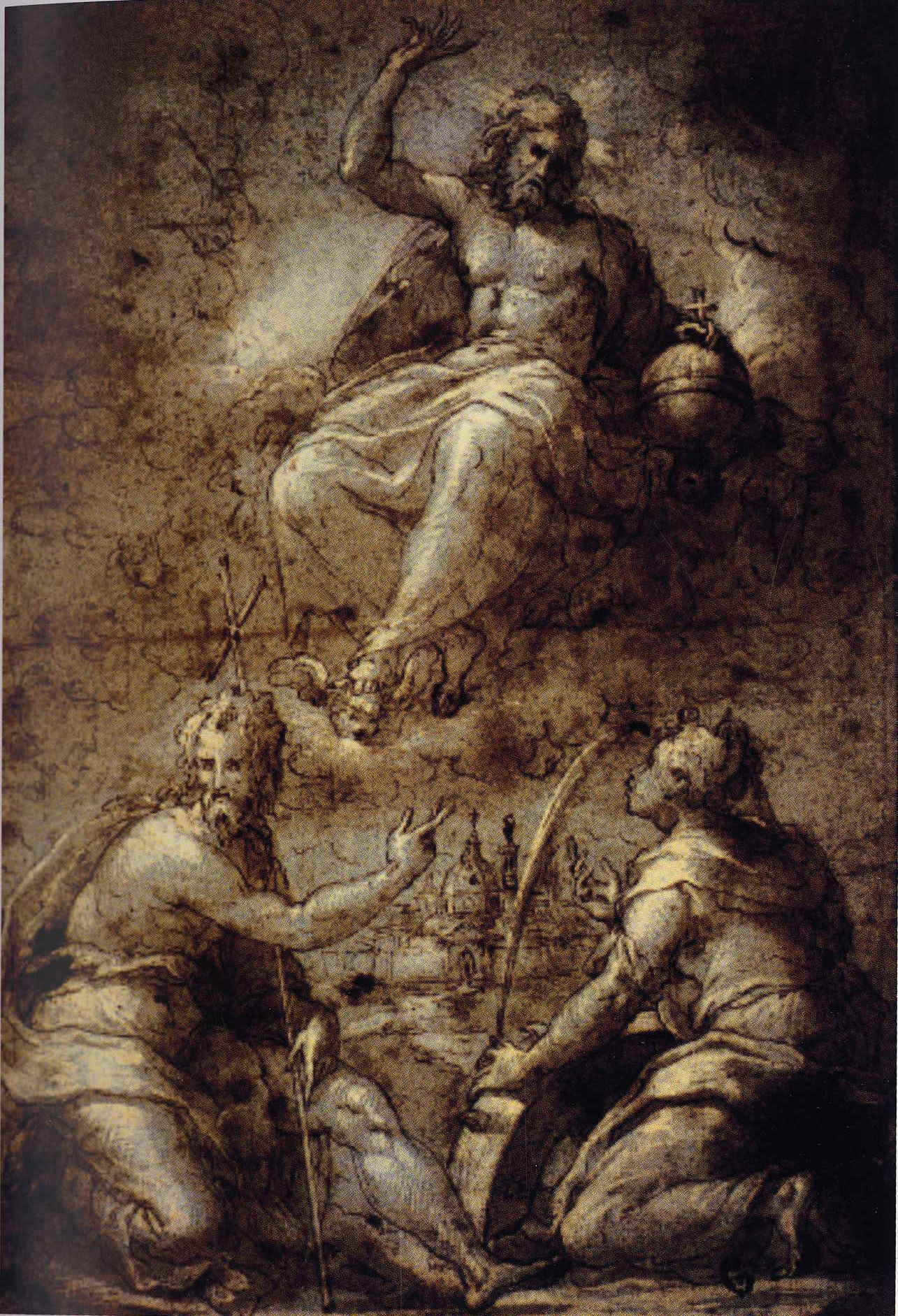
Preparatory drawing for Pala Lioni, Florence, Gabinetto Disegni, Uffizi Museum

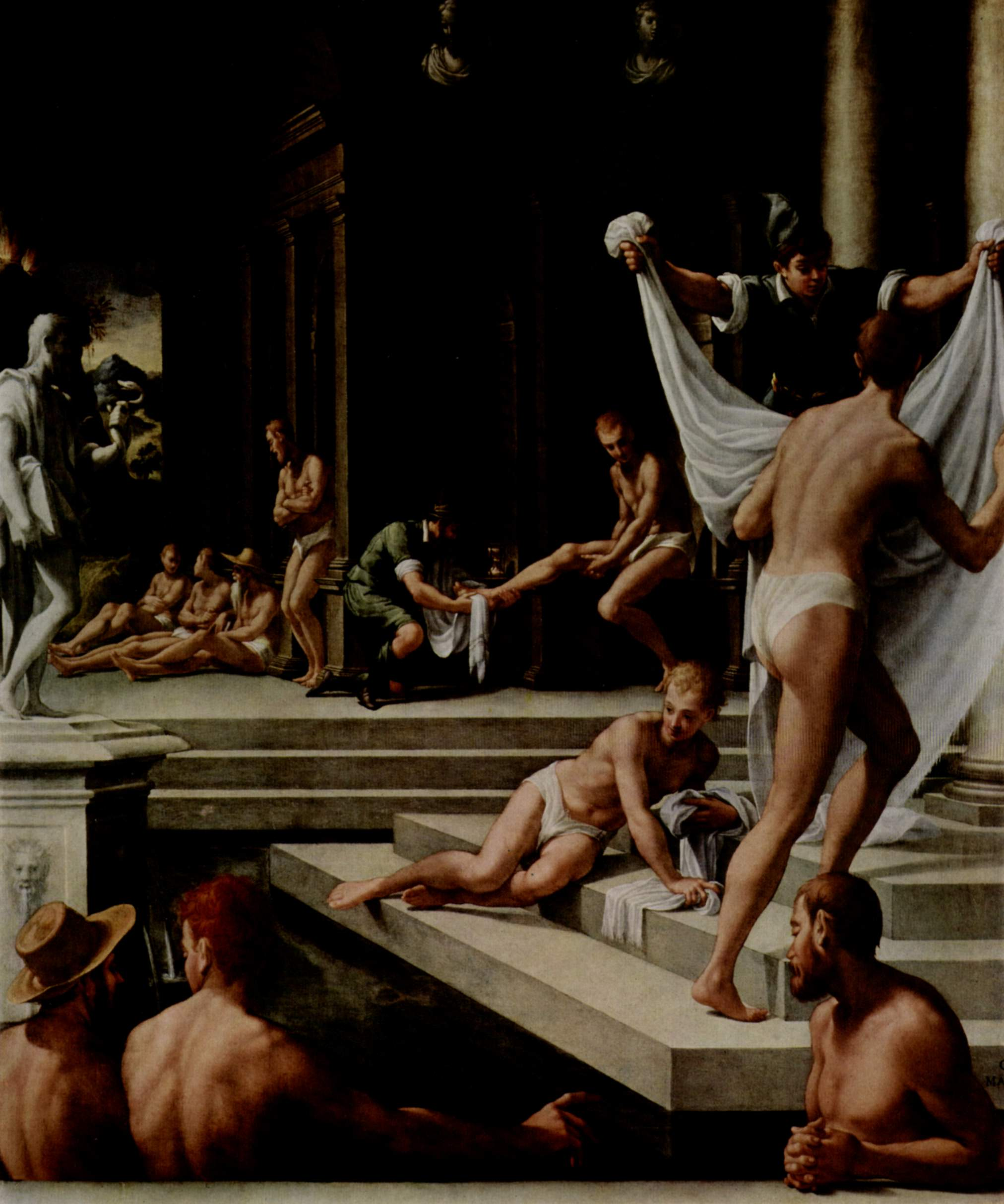
Pozzuoli baths, Florence, Palazzo Vecchio, Francesco I's Studiolo

Girolamo Macchietti (c. 1535/1541–1592) was an Italian painter active in Florence, working in a Mannerist style.

== Biography ==
He was a pupil of Michele di Ridolfo. Between 1556 and 1562 he worked as an assistant to Giorgio Vasari in the decoration of the Palazzo Vecchio, where he worked with Mirabello Cavalori. He participated in the Vasari-directed decoration of the Studiolo of Francesco I with two canvases, one relating a Jason and Medea (1570) and the other a Baths of Pozzuoli (1572). He also painted an altarpiece on the Martyrdom of Saint Lawrence for Santa Maria Novella. In 1577, he completed a Gloria di San Lorenzo for Empoli Cathedral. He traveled to Rome and spent two years in Spain (1587–1589). No works are recorded from these travels.

== Works ==
- Pala Lioni, 1562–1568, Florence, Villa Lioni-Michelozzi-Roti-Clavarino
- Epiphany, 1568, Florence, San Lorenzo
- Jason and Medea, 1570–1572, Studiolo of Francesco I, Palazzo Vecchio, Florence
- The baths of Pozzuoli, 1570–1572, Studiolo of Francesco I, Palazzo Vecchio, Florence
- Martyrdom of San Lorenzo, 1573, Santa Maria Novella, Florence
- Virgin's girdle, 1574, Santa Agata, Florence
- Apotheosis of San Lorenzo, 1577, Empoli Cathedral
- Allegory of Prudence, (Private Collection), traditionally attributed to Vasari until recently.
- Crucifixion, 1590, San Giovannino degli Scolopi, Florence

== Bibliography ==
- Raffaello Borghini, Il Riposo, 1584, p. 604.
- Michelangelo Buonarroti il Giovane, L'Ajone, favola narrativa burlesca, 1623.
- Francesco Del Furia, Di alcuni scritti di Michelangelo Buonarroti il Giovane, 1818, pp. 1, 66.
- Atti dell'imp e reale Accademia della Crusca, Florence, 1829, Vol.2, p. 79.
- Freedberg, Sydney J. (1971). Pelican History of Art (ed.). Painting in Italy, 1500-1600. Penguin Books Ltd. pp. 616–619.
- Marta Privitera, Girolamo Macchietti tra Palazzo Vecchio e San Lorenzo, 1989.
- Marta Privitera, Girolamo Macchietti a Napoli, balls.
- Marta Privitera, Girolamo Macchietti: un pittore dello Studiolo di Francesco I (Firenze, 1535-1592), Jandi Sapi ed., 1996.
- The Grove Dictionary of Art, Macmillan Publishers (2000)
- Marta Privitera, Girolamo Macchietti, la Pala Lioni, in "Altomani 2004", n.1.
- Alessandro Nesi, Un quadro a Kiev e altre note su Girolamo Macchietti, in "Nuovi Studi" n.12, 2006, pp. 129–136, pic. 180.
