= Uccello =

Uccello (Italian: [utˈtʃɛllo]) is an Italian surname. Notable people with this surname include:

- Antonina Uccello (1922–2023), American politician
- Julian Uccello (born 1986), Canadian soccer player
- Luca Uccello (born 1997), Canadian soccer player
- Paolo Uccello (1397–1475), Italian painter and mathematician
