= Stoldo Lorenzi =

Italian sculptor

- Born: 1534; Settignano, Duchy of Florence
- Died: 1583 (aged 48–49); Pisa, Grand Duchy of Tuscany
- Occupation: Sculptor
- Father: Gino Lorenzi

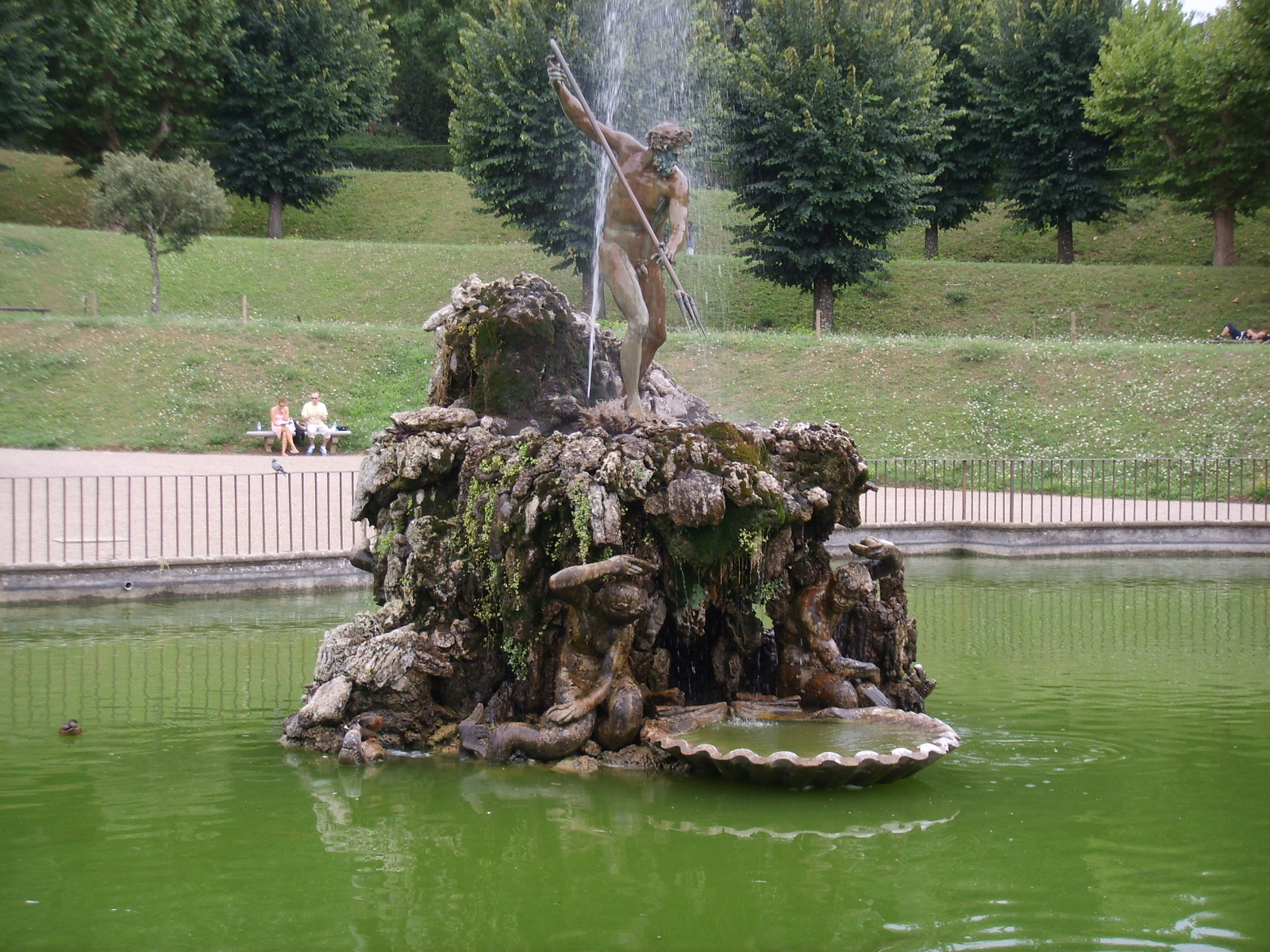
Fountain of Neptune in the Boboli Gardens

Stoldo Lorenzi (Stoldo di Gino Lorenzi; 1534 – after 1583) was an Italian Mannerist sculptor active in Florence and Pisa.

Born 1534 in Settignano, Tuscany, close to Florence. He was born the son of Gino Lorenzi, of a family of renowned stone-carvers (scalpellini), and had a brother Antonia, at least 10 years his senior.

He studied drawing under Michele Tosini in Florence, where Girolamo Macchietti was a fellow student, intending eventually to become a painter, He would later apprentice to become a sculptor under Niccolò Tribolo.

He was influenced by artists such as Giambologna and Tribolo. Lorenzi mostly executed bronze sculptures. Among his best known works are the Annunciation in Santa Maria della Spina, Pisa (1561), the Fountain of Neptune 1565–1568) placed in the Boboli Gardens, Florence, and the bronze angel holding a candelabra which he executed for the Duomo di Pisa.

He was also part of a team of artists providing sculpture for the Studiolo of Francesco I at the Piazza Vecchio, and for this he made a bronze Galatea (1573) and the statuette of Amphitrite holding a nautilus and a coral branch.

He is counted among artists responsible for the diffusion of mannerist style by subsequently doing work in Milan. In Milan, he provided some sculptures for the façade of Santa Maria presso San Celso (1573–1582).

Lorenzi died in Pisa in 1583.
