= Valerio Cioli =

Italian sculptor

Valerio Cioli (or Cigoli or Giogoli) (1529–1599) was an Italian Renaissance sculptor.

== Works ==
His most famous work is the Fontana del Bacchino (1560) in the Giardino di Boboli, near the entrance to piazza Pitti in Florence. It depicts the famed dwarf buffoon at the court of Cosimo I, ironically nicknamed Morgante (after the giant of the poem Morgante by Luigi Pulci), portrayed nuded and sitting on a tortoise like a drunken Bacchus. Two more of Cioli's works (collaborations with Giovanni Simone Cioli) are to be found in the giardino di Boboli - the Uomo che vanga (digging man) and the Uomo che scarica il secchio in un tino (man emptying a bucket into a vat).

Other works of his include a Satyr with a flask in the Museo del Bargello and sculptures of personifications of Painting, Sculpture, and Architecture on the tomb of Michelangelo Buonarroti in the basilica of Santa Croce. Along with Giovanni Vincenzo Casali, he helped complete the statue of San Giovanni Evangelista for the Chapel of San Luca in the Annunziata in Florence.

== Images ==
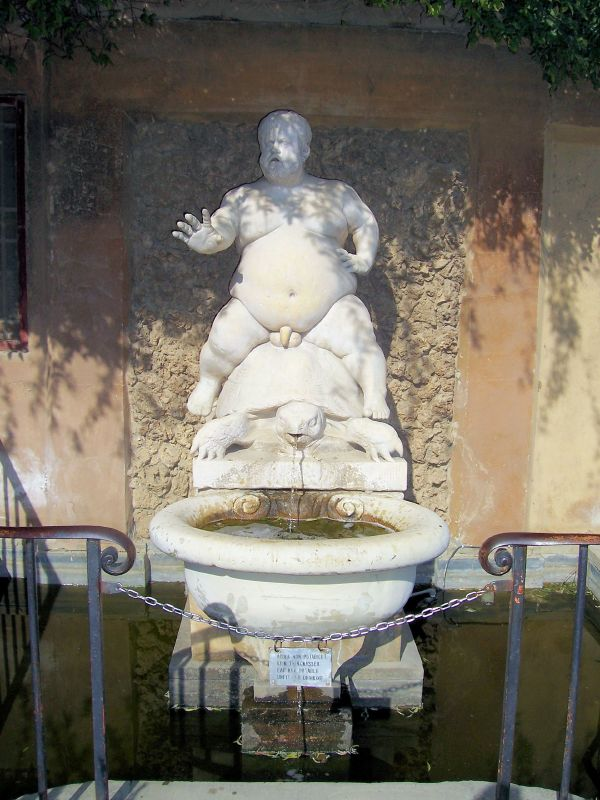
The Fontana del Bacchino, Boboli Gardens, Florence

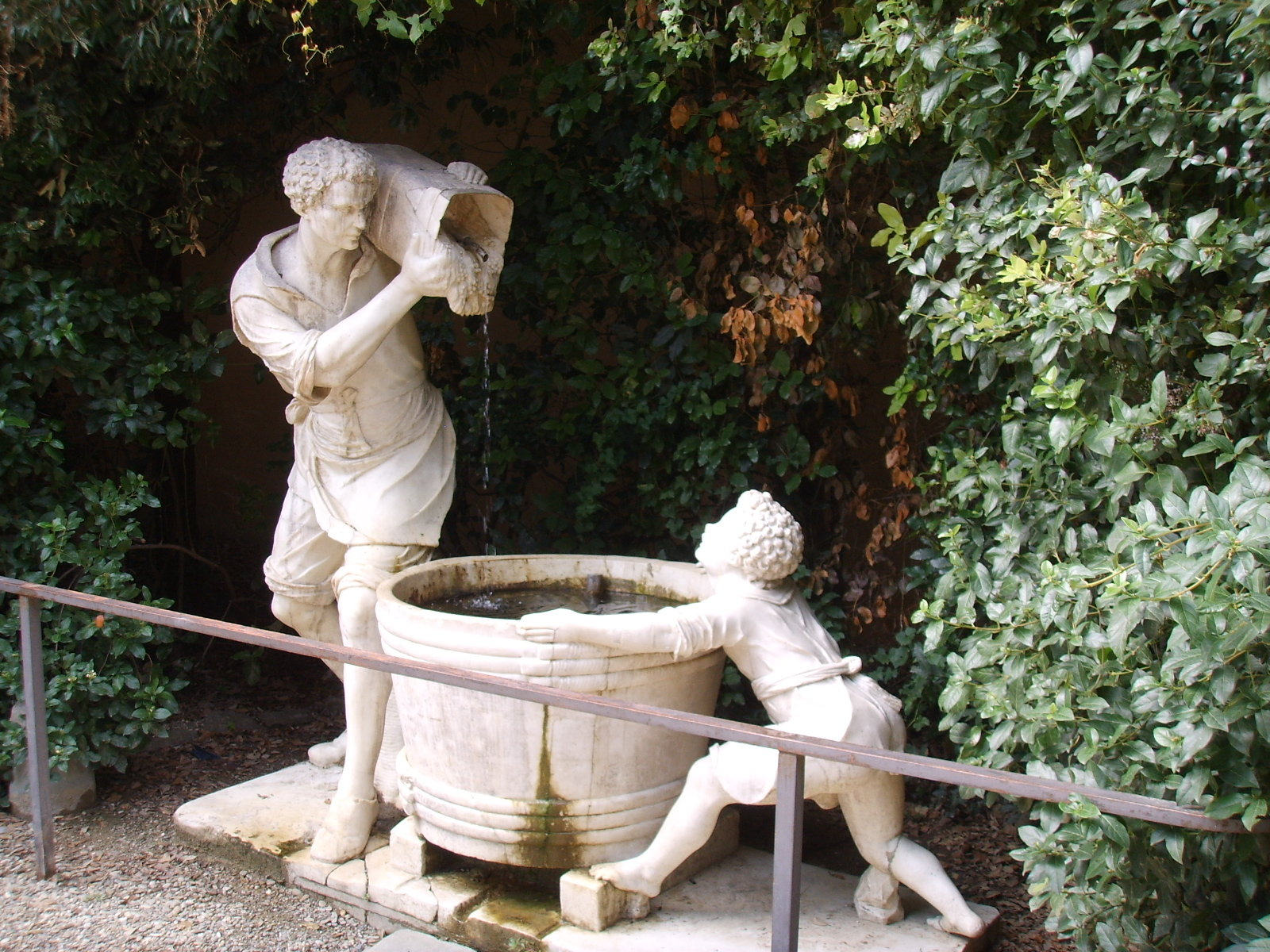
Fontana dell'Uomo che scarica il secchio in un tino, Boboli

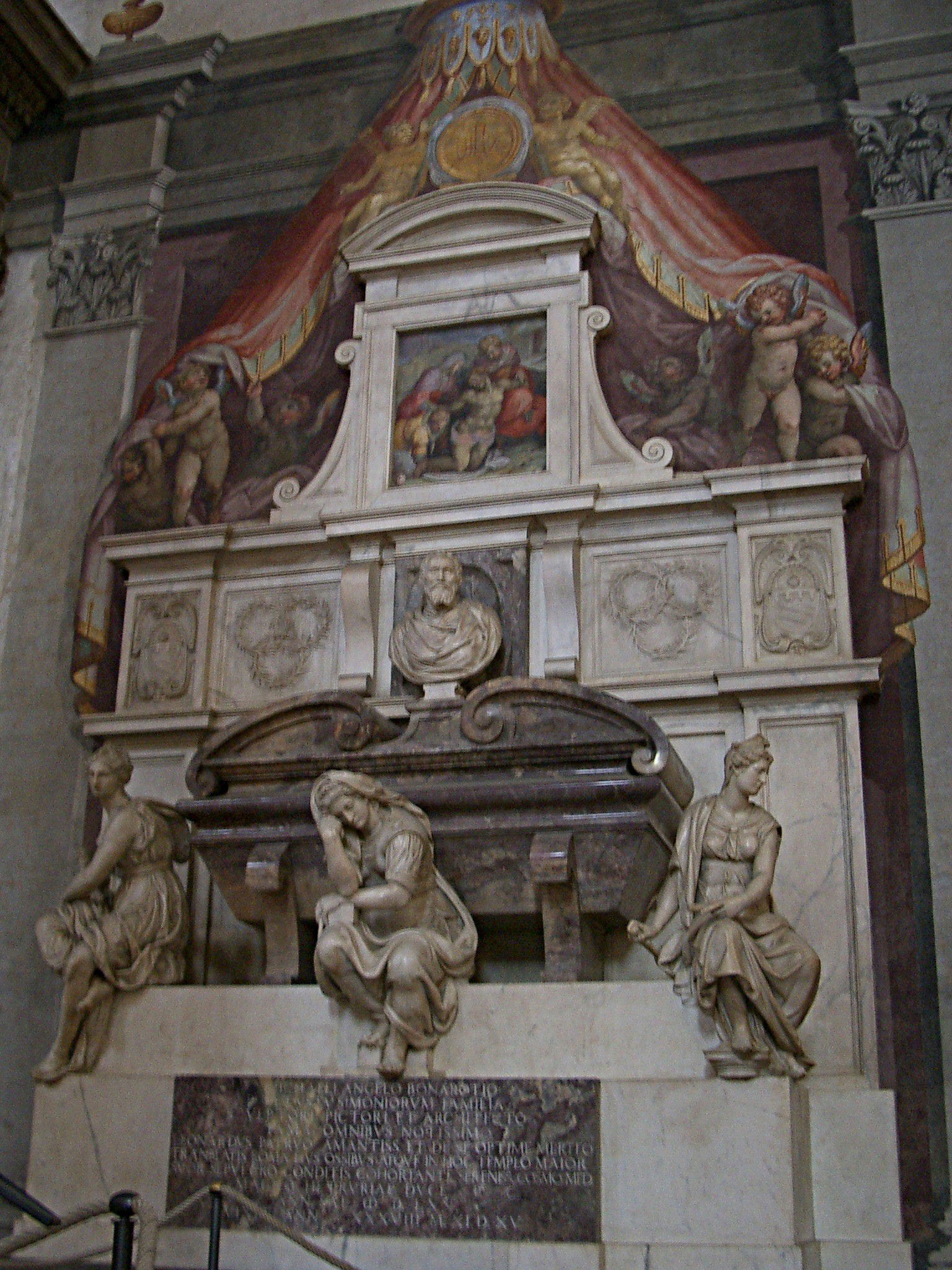
Tomb of Michelangelo
