= Vincenzo de' Rossi =

Italian sculptor (1525-1587)

Vincenzo de' Rossi (b. Fiesole, 1525. d. Florence, 1587) was an Italian sculptor.

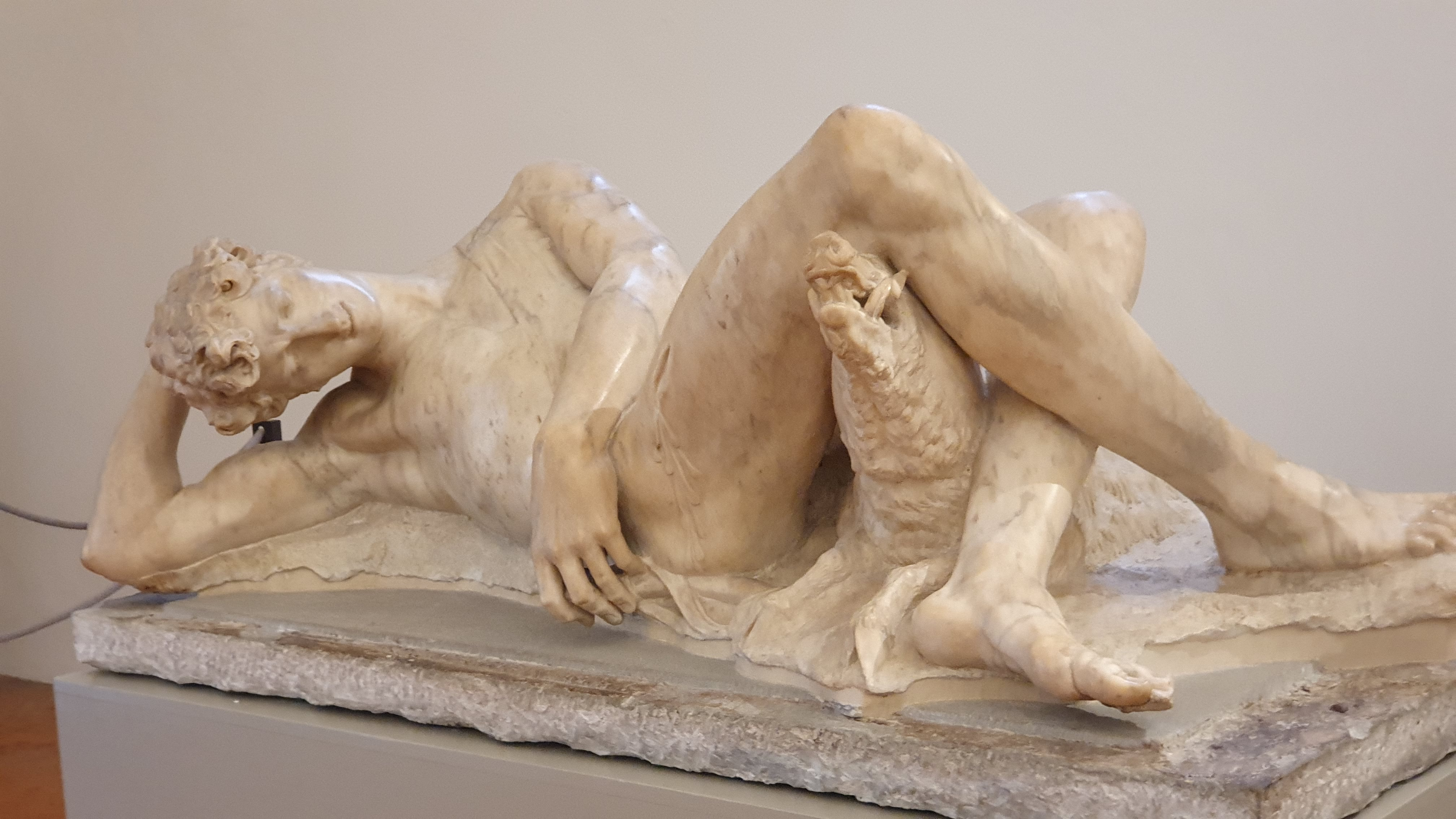
Dying Adonis

== Work ==
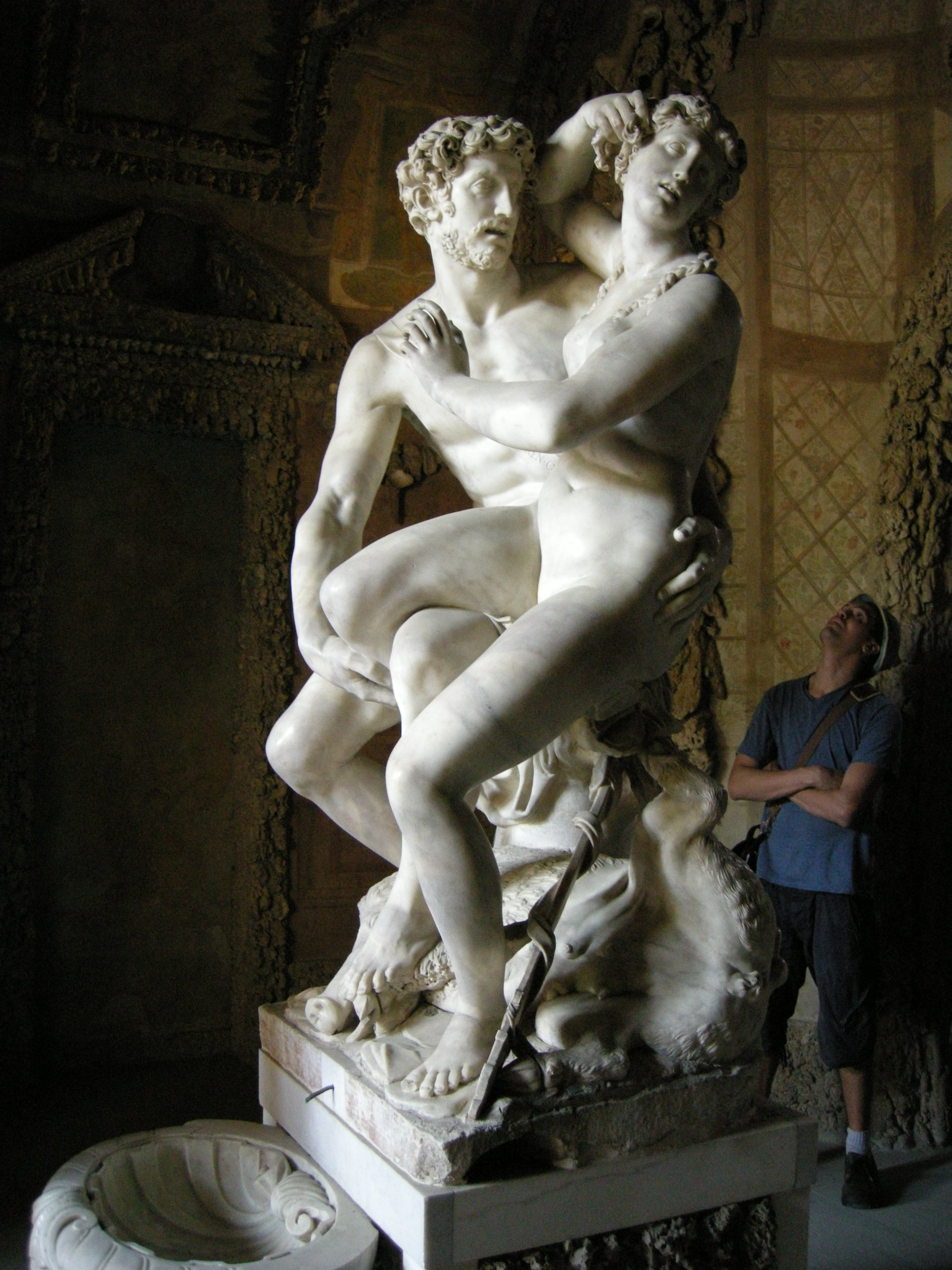
Theseus and Helen by Vincenzo de' Rossi. The sculpture was highly praised at the time for having been crafted from a single piece of marble, without additions, as was common.

Rossi was mentored by Baccio Bandinelli.

Many of Rossi's works historically were incorrectly attributed to Michelangelo, such as Dying Adonis.

Some of his most famous works were his sculptures of the Twelve Labours of Hercules, of which he only completed seven. Six of these sculptures are located in at the Palazzo Vecchio. The seventh labour, Hercules with Atlas, is located at the Villa di Poggio Imperiale.

His statue St. Joseph with Christ as a Child resides in the Pantheon in Rome.
