= Strage degli Innocenti =

Strage degli Innocenti or La Strage degli Innocenti may refer to:

== Literature ==
- La strage degli innocenti, a 1631 poem by Giambattista Marino

== Music ==
- La strage degli innocenti, a 1682 oratorio by Giovanni Buonaventura Viviani
- La Strage degli Innocenti, a 1900 oratorio by Lorenzo Perosi
- La strage degli innocenti, a cantata by Marcello Abbado

== Paintings ==
- Strage degli Innocenti, a painting in Siena Cathedral, probably by Matteo di Giovanni in 1481
- Massacre of the Innocents (Daniele da Volterra) or Strage degli innocenti, a 1557 painting
- La Strage degli Innocenti, a 2020 painting by Giuseppe Veneziano

== See also ==
- Massacre of the Innocents (disambiguation)
- Massacre of the Innocents, in the Gospel of Matthew
