= Double-sided painting =

Canvas with paintings on both sides

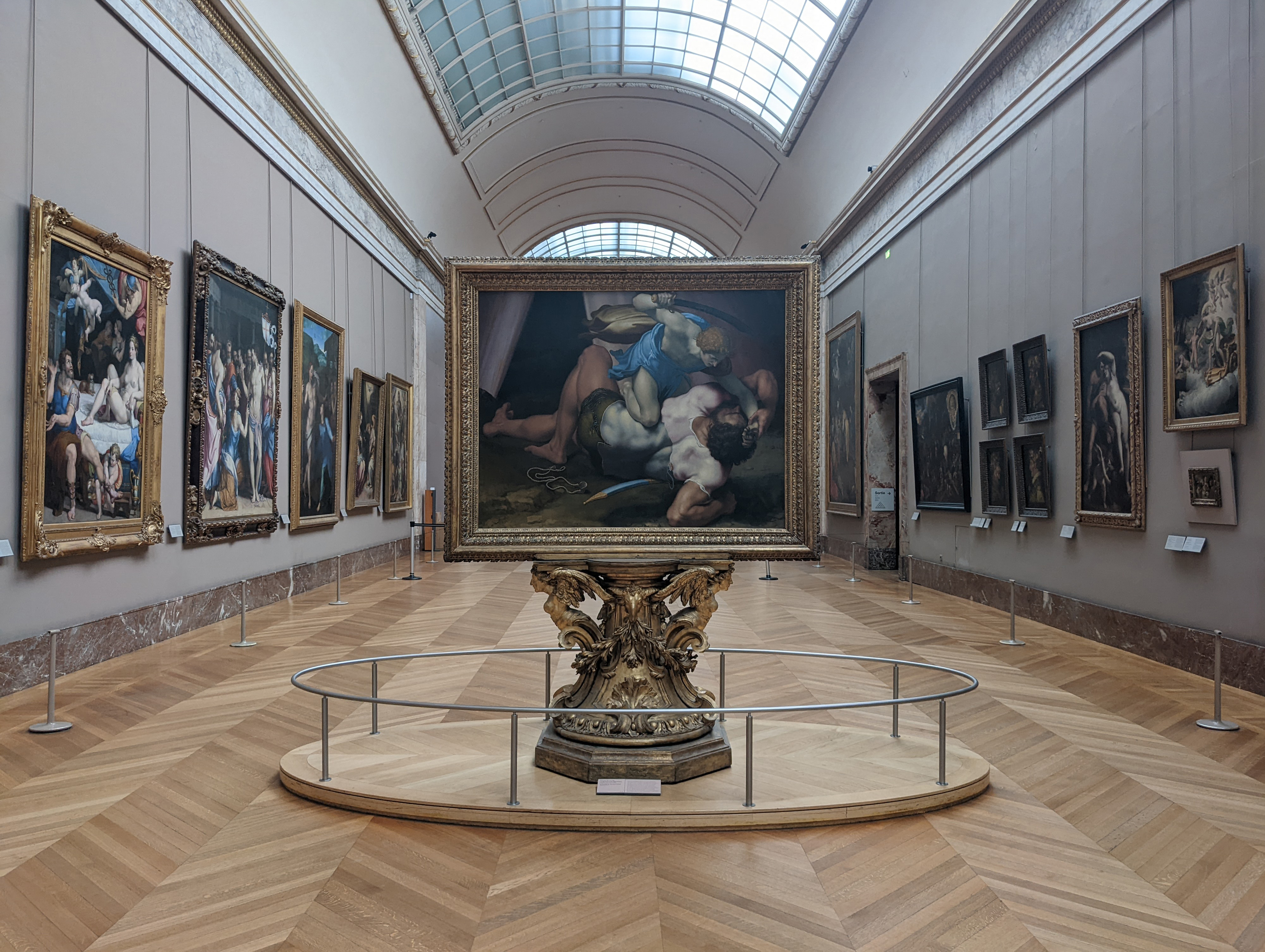
The recto side of Daniele da Volterra's David and Goliath.

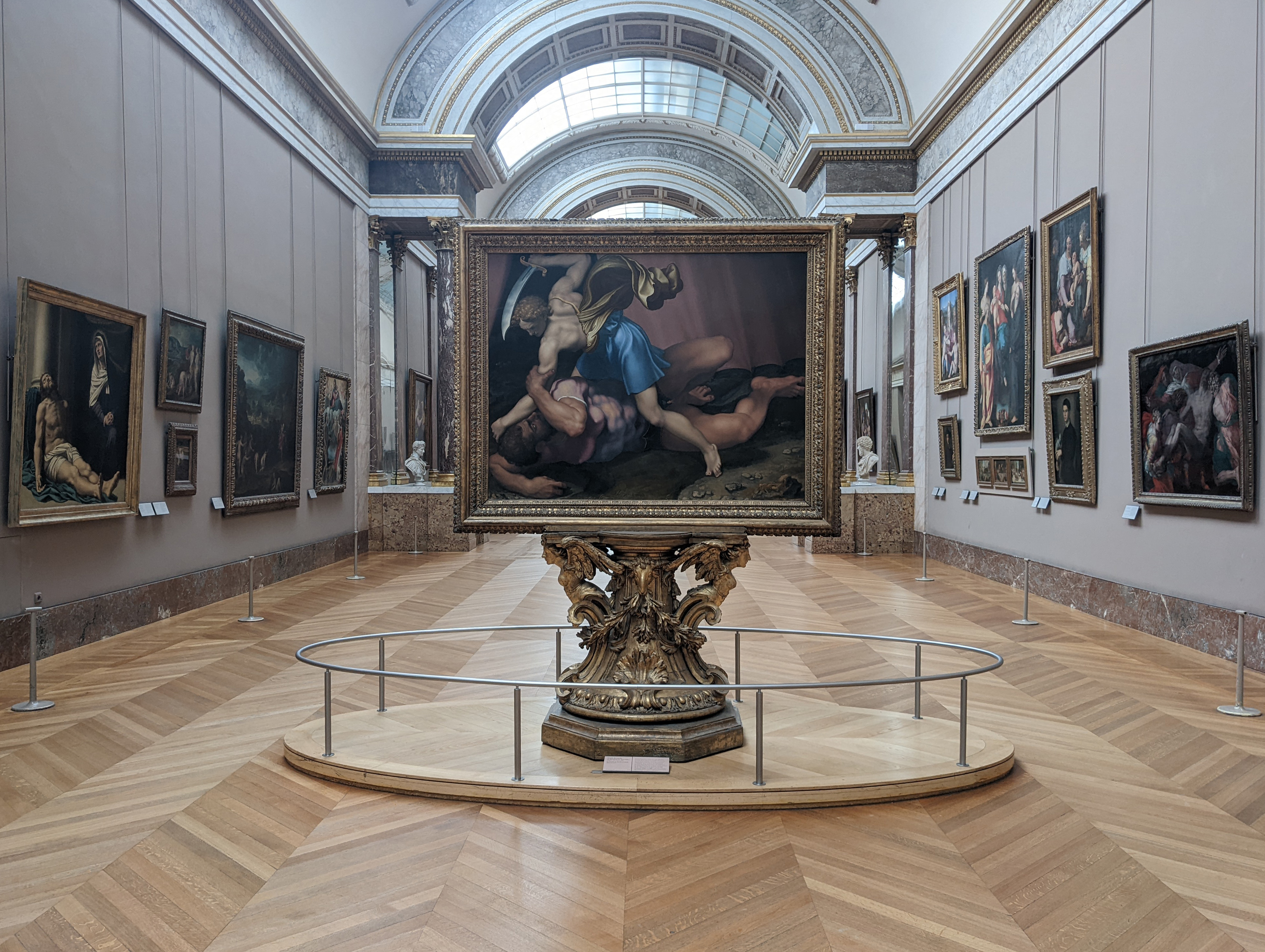
The verso side of Daniele da Volterra's David and Goliath.

A double-sided painting is a canvas which has a painting on either side. Historically, artists would often paint on both sides out of need of material. The subject matter of the two paintings was sometimes, although not normally, related.

Restoring and displaying double-sided paintings can pose additional challenges for museums and galleries. When repairing canvases, restorers must ensure that their restoration efforts do not damage the image on either side. They must also use stretcher bars that do not obscure either side of the image, and they cannot use crossbars to help keep tension.

== List of double-sided paintings ==
- David and Goliath by Daniele da Volterra
- Portrait of the Dwarf Nano Morgante by Bronzino
