= Elijah in the Desert =

Painting by Daniele da Volterra

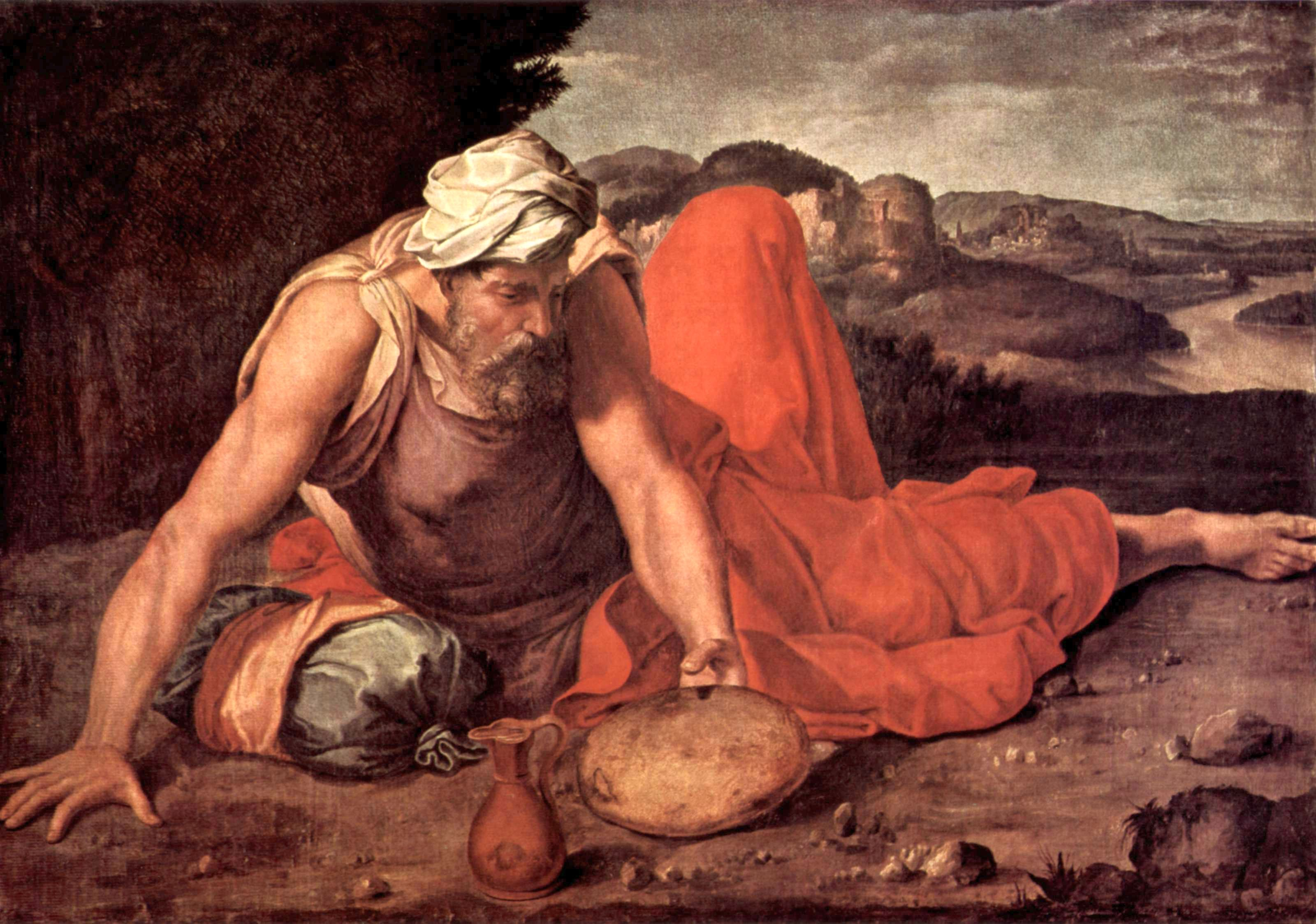
- Artist: Daniele da Volterra
- Year: c. 1543-1547
- Medium: oil on panel
- Dimensions: 81 cm × 115 cm (32 in × 45 in)
- Location: Uffizi, Florence

Elijah in the Desert is an oil on panel painting by Daniele da Volterra, from c. 1543-1547. With Massacre of the Innocents and Madonna and Child with the Infant St John the Baptist and Saint Barbara, it is one of a number of paintings by the artist now in the Uffizi in Florence.

== History ==
The work shows the influence of Michelangelo's work on the artist, especially the Sistine Chapel and Last Judgement. It shows the prophet Elijah reflecting on the bread brought to him by a raven and on a vine branch, interpreted in Christian theology as a foreshadowing of the Eucharist.

According to Benedetto Falconcini's Elogio, this work and Madonna and Child with the Infant St John the Baptist and Saint Barbara were in the artist's descendants' home in Volterra in 1772, before both passing by descent to the Pannocchieschi counts of Elci together with Madonna and Child with the Infant St John the Baptist and Saint Barbara. An export ban was placed on the work in 1979 and it was acquired by the Italian state in 2018

== Bibliography ==
- (in Italian) Roberto Paolo Ciardi and Benedetta Moreschini, Daniele Ricciarelli. Da Volterra a Roma, Volterra, Cassa di risparmio di Volterra, 2004.
- Paul Barolsky, Daniele Da Volterra: A Catalogue Raisonné, Garland Publishing, 1979.
