= Massacre of the Innocents (Daniele da Volterra) =

Painting by Daniele da Volterra

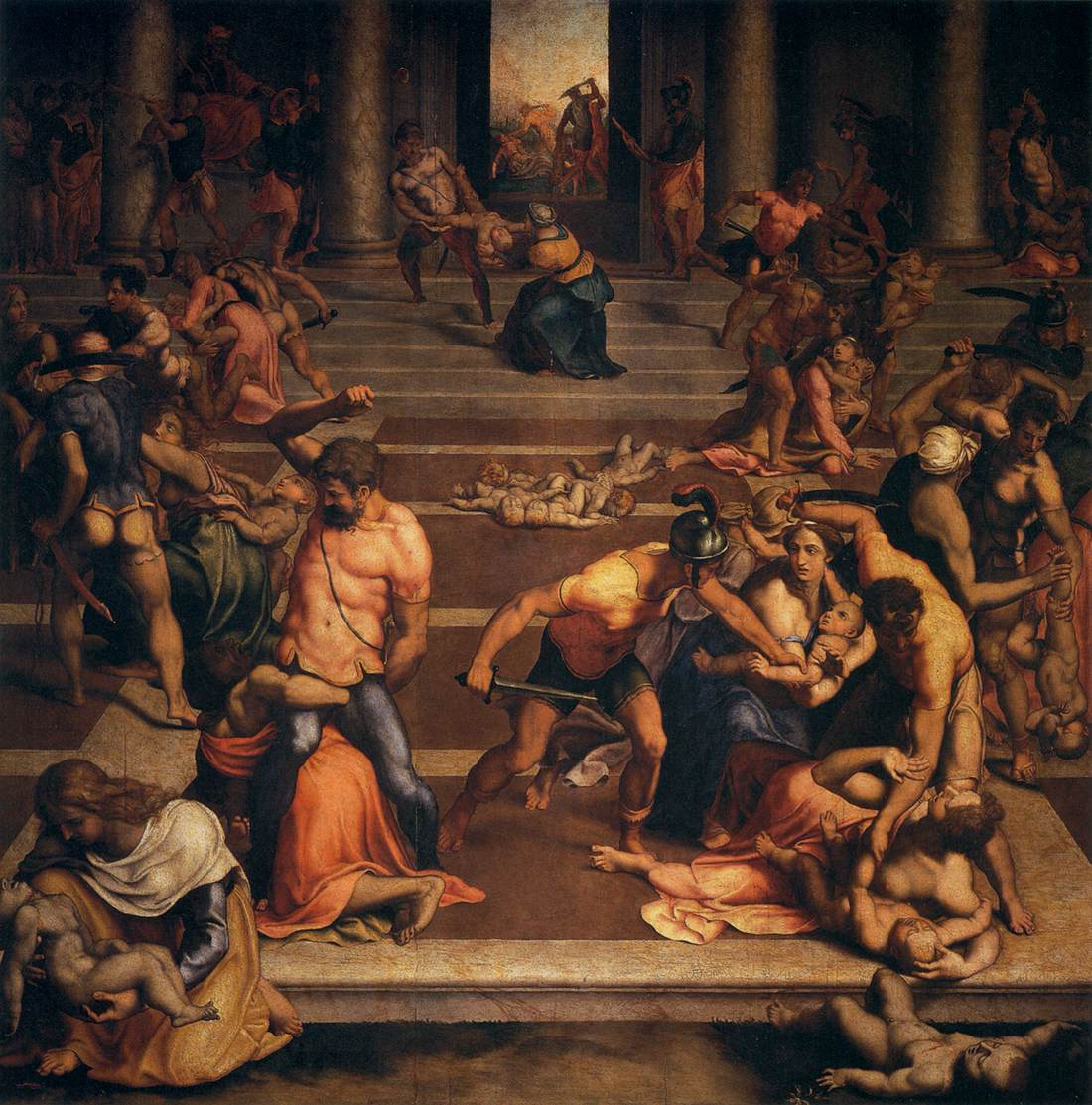
- Artist: Daniele da Volterra
- Year: 1557
- Medium: oil on panel
- Dimensions: 147 cm × 144 cm (58 in × 57 in)
- Location: Uffizi, Florence

Massacre of the Innocents is an oil on panel painting by Daniele da Volterra, created in 1557. It is held in the Uffizi, in Florence, one of a number of works by the artist in its collections (others are Madonna and Child with the Infant John the Baptist and Saint Barbara and Elijah in the Desert).

== History ==
After these things, since he had not been back to his home town of Volterra for a long time, he went there before returning to Rome and was made very welcome by his friends and relations, who asked him to leave some memory of him behind in his fatherland. He thus made them a painting with small figures showing the history of the Innocents, which was held to be a most beautiful work, and placed it in the church of San Piero

— Giorgio Vasari, Lives of the Artists, 1568

It was painted for San Pietro in Selci church in Volterra during the artist's last visit to his birthplace - he even waived the fee for the work It was the last autograph painting by the artist - after this date he almost exclusively worked as a sculptor For it he simply made some small modifications to one of his own cartoons, already used by his student Michele Alberti for a fresco at the chiesa della Trinità dei Monti in Rome. The main differences to the cartoon are due to the fact that there were two voids in the fresco - at bottom left a woman with a dead child was added (for whom a drawing survives in the Prints and Drawings department of the Louvre) and at bottom right a dead child

The Uffizi's director Giuseppe Bencivenni Pelli acquired it for 600 scudi for Leopold II in 1782. It was initially exhibited in the Tribuna of the Uffizi, where it remained until 1926. It then spent a time in the Galleria dell'Accademia before returning to the Uffizi. It was restored in 1979.

== Bibliography ==
- (in Italian) Roberto Paolo Ciardi and Benedetta Moreschini, Daniele Ricciarelli. Da Volterra a Roma, Volterra, Cassa di risparmio di Volterra, 2004.
- Paul Barolsky, Daniele Da Volterra: A Catalogue Raisonné, Garland Publishing, 1979.
