= Palazzo Massimo alle Colonne =

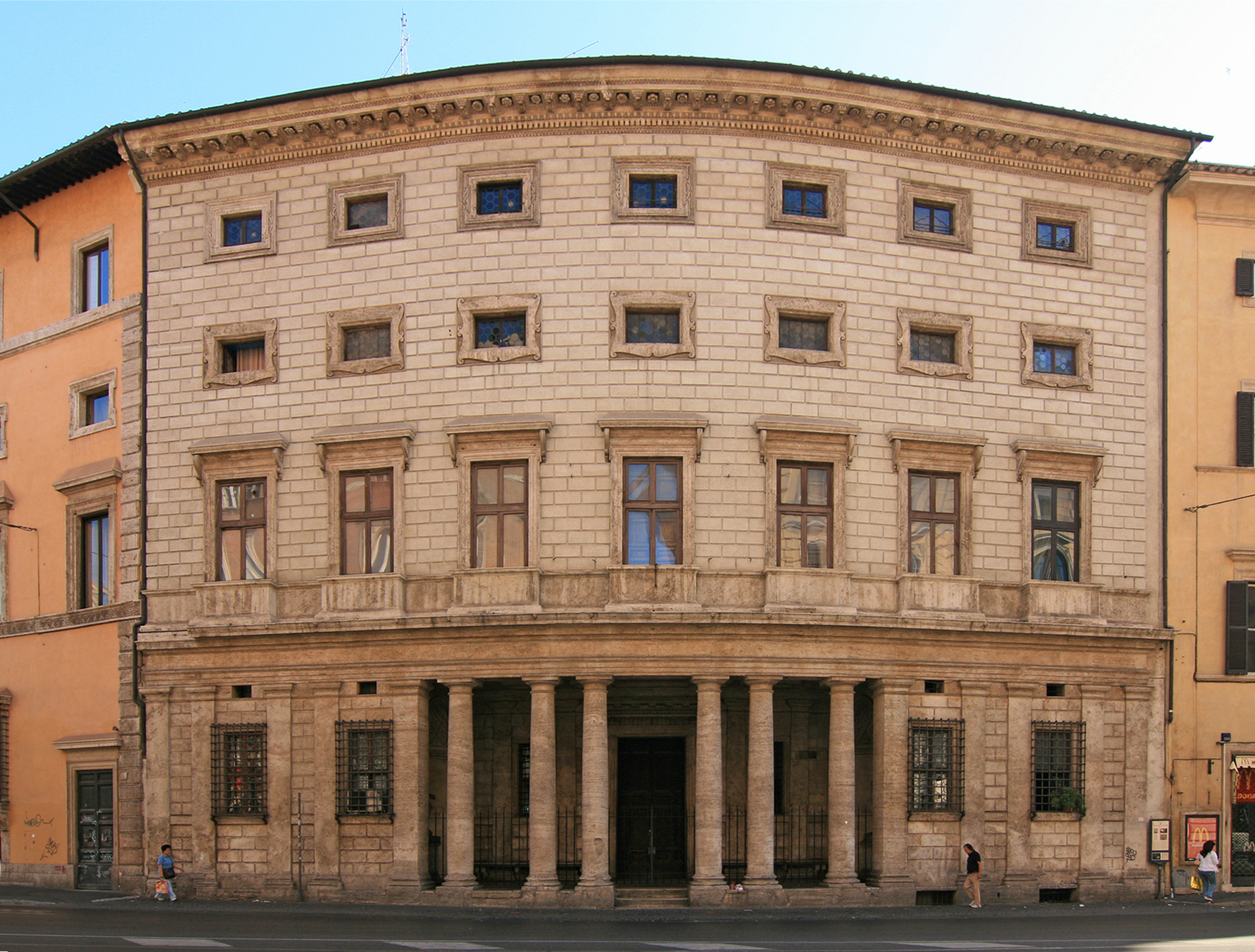
- Facade of Palazzo Massimo alle Colonne.
- Click on the map for a fullscreen view

General information
- Location: Rome, Italy
- Coordinates: 41°53′48″N 12°28′25″E

The Palazzo Massimo alle Colonne is a Renaissance palace in Rome, Italy.

== History ==
The palace was designed by Baldassarre Peruzzi in 1532–1536 on a site of three contiguous palaces owned by the old Roman Massimo family and built after arson destroyed the earlier structures during the Sack of Rome (1527). In addition the curved facade was dictated by foundations built upon the stands for the stadium (odeon) of the emperor Domitian. It fronts the now-busy Corso Vittorio Emanuele II, a few hundred yards from the front of the church of Sant'Andrea della Valle. Prince Fabrizio Massimo and his wife Princess Beatrice of Bourbon lived there just after their wedding in 1897.

== Entrance ==
The entrance is characterized by a central portico with six Doric columns, paired and single. Inside there are two courtyards, of which the first one has a portico with Doric columns as a basement for a rich loggia, which is also made of Doric columns. The column decorations gave the name to the palace, alle Colonne. The facade is renowned as one of the most masterful of its time, combining both elegance with stern rustication. The recessed entrance portico differs from typical palazzo models such as exemplified by the Florentine Palazzo Medici. In addition, there is a variation of size of windows for different levels, and the decorative frames of the windows of the third floor. Unlike the Palazzo Medici, there is no academic adherence to superimposition of orders, depending on the floor. On the opposite facade of this palace, opening onto the Piazzetta de' Massimi, the palace connects with the frescoed facade of the conjoined annex, the Palazzetto Massimo (or Palazzetto Istoriato). For many centuries, this used to be the central post office of Rome, a Massimo family perquisite. To the left of the palace is the Palazzo di Pirro, built by a pupil of Antonio da Sangallo.

== Interior ==
The interior ceilings and vestibules are elaborately ornamented with rosettes and coffered roofs. The entrance ceiling is decorated with a fresco by Daniele da Volterra, who represented scenes from the Life of Fabio Massimo, the supposed Roman founder of the Massimo family.

== Chapel ==
The chapel on the second floor was a room where the 14-year-old Paolo Massimo, son of Fabrizio Massimo, was recalled briefly to life by Saint Philip Neri on March 16, 1583. The interior of the palace is open to the public annually only on that day. Other notable events in the palace of the 16th century including various intrafamilial murders.

Preceded by Palace of Justice, Rome	Landmarks of Rome; Palazzo Massimo alle Colonne	Succeeded by Palazzo Mattei
