= Madonna and Child with the Infant John the Baptist and Saint Barbara =

Painting by Daniele da Volterra

Madonna and Child with the Infant St John the Baptist and Saint Barbara
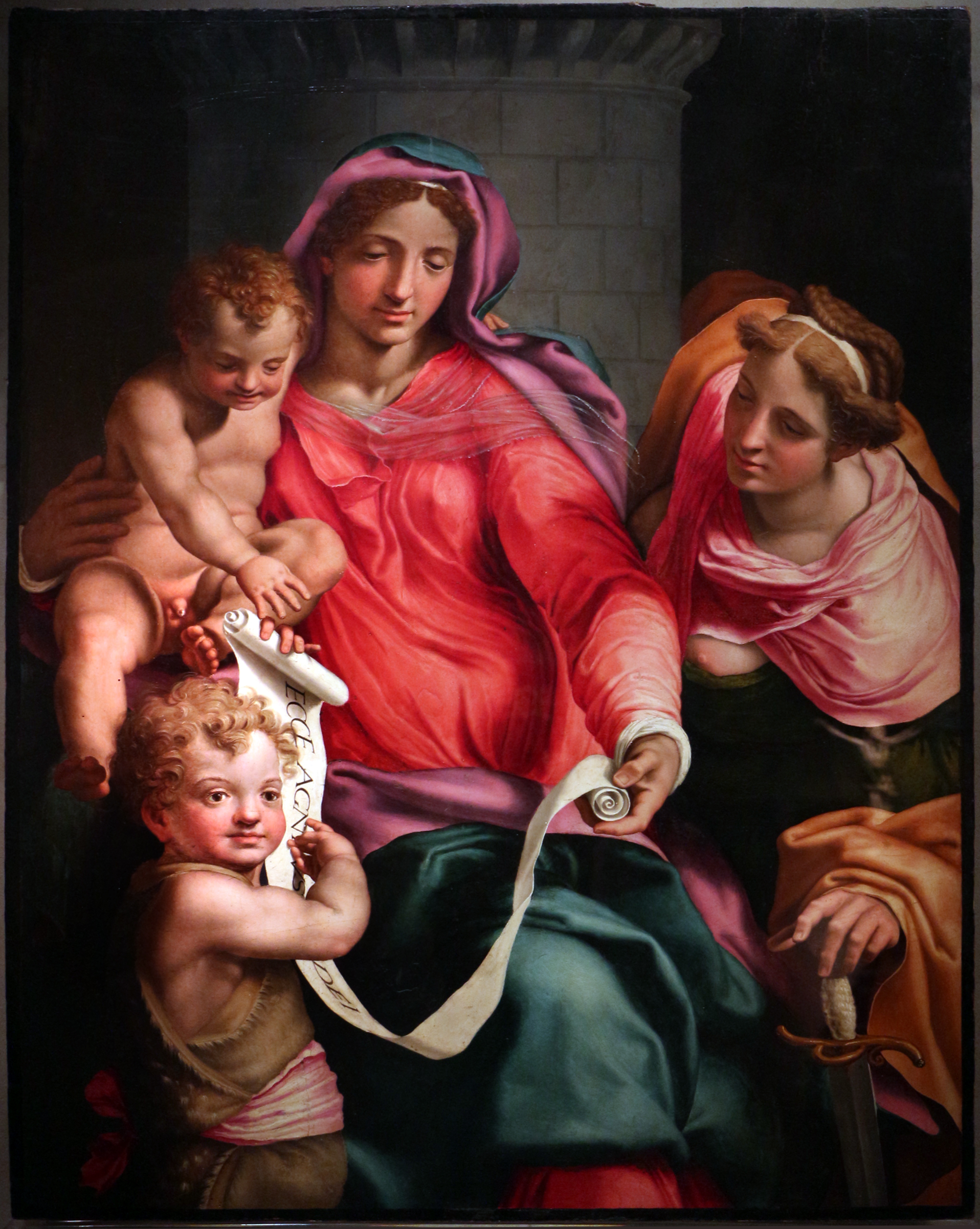
- Artist: Daniele da Volterra
- Year: 1548
- Medium: oil on panel
- Dimensions: 81 cm × 115 cm (32 in × 45 in)
- Location: Uffizi, Florence

Madonna and Child with the Infant St John the Baptist and Saint Barbara is an oil on panel painting by Daniele da Volterra, from 1548. It is held in the Uffizi, in Florence.

== History ==
According to Benedetto Falconcini's Elogio this work and Elijah in the Desert were still in the artist's descendants' house in Volterra in 1772, before descending to the Pannocchieschi counts of Elci. An export bar was placed on the work in 1979 and it remained the last work by the artist in private hands until the Uffizi acquired it in September 2019.
