= Massacre of the Innocents (disambiguation) =

Massacre of the Innocents is a narrative from the Gospel of Matthew.

Massacre of the Innocents may also refer to:

- Massacre of the Innocents (Bruegel)
- Massacre of the Innocents (Daniele da Volterra)
- Massacre of the Innocents (Matteo di Giovanni)
- The Massacre of the Innocents (Poussin)
- Massacre of the Innocents (Moretto)
- Massacre of the Innocents (Reni)
- Massacre of the Innocents (Rubens)

== See also ==
- Strage degli Innocenti (disambiguation)
