= Michele Alberti =

Late 16th-century Italian painter

- Born: c. 1530; Sansepolcro, Tuscany
- Known for: Painting
- Movement: Mannerist

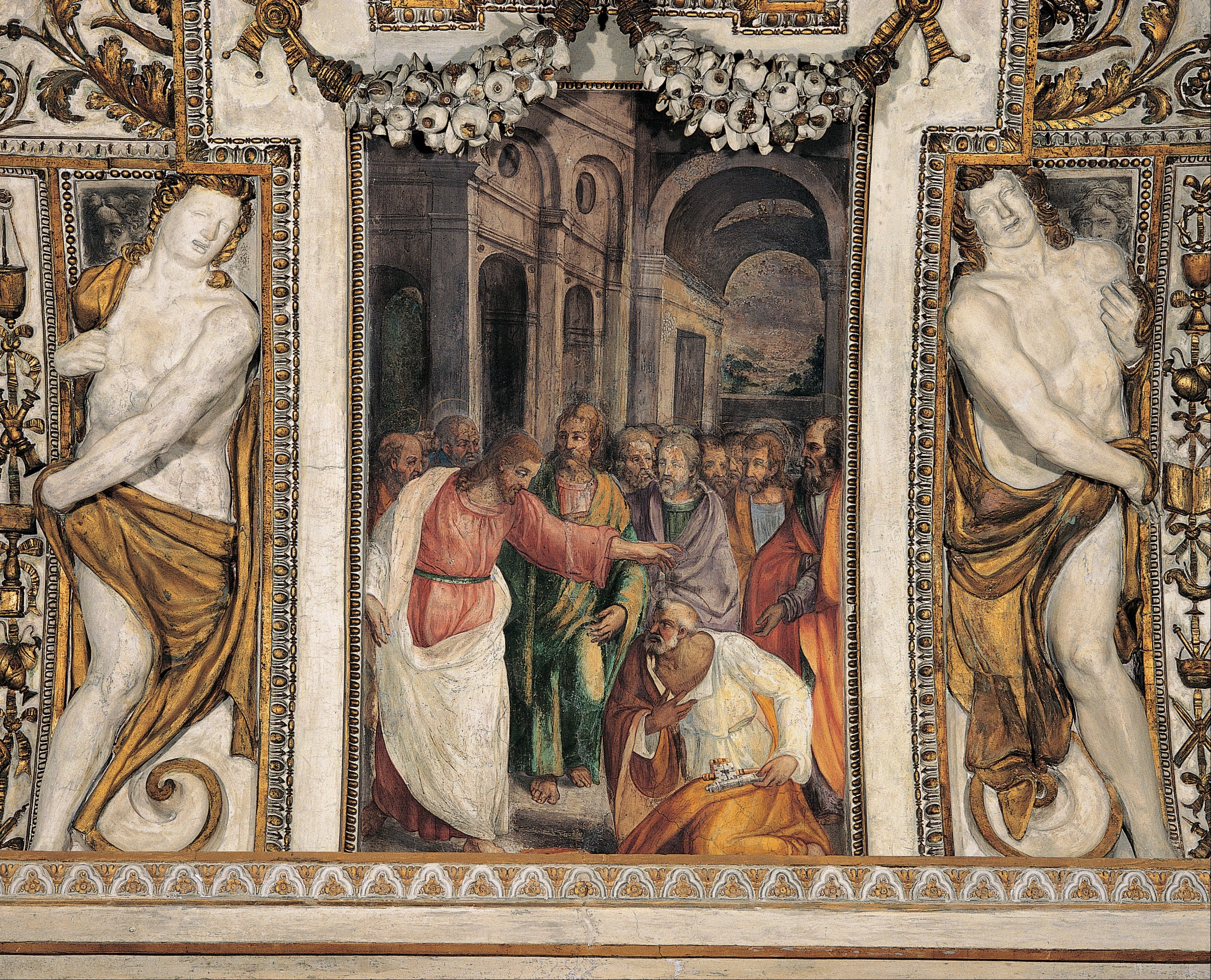
Deliver of the Keys to Saint Peter

Michele Alberti was an Italian painter of the latter half of the 16th century.

== Biography ==
Born in Sansepolcro, Tuscany, Alberti trained in Florence, where he was a pupil of Daniele da Volterra. His most famous paintings are Murder of the Innocents at the church of Trinità dei Monti. He painted the vaults of the Conservators' Apartment, representing the Murder of the Innocents, much spoiled by restoration. Michele Alberti has been erroneously recorded as a member of the family of Durante Alberti of Borgo San Sepolcro.
