= David and Goliath (Daniele da Volterra) =

Double-sided painting by Daniele da Volterra

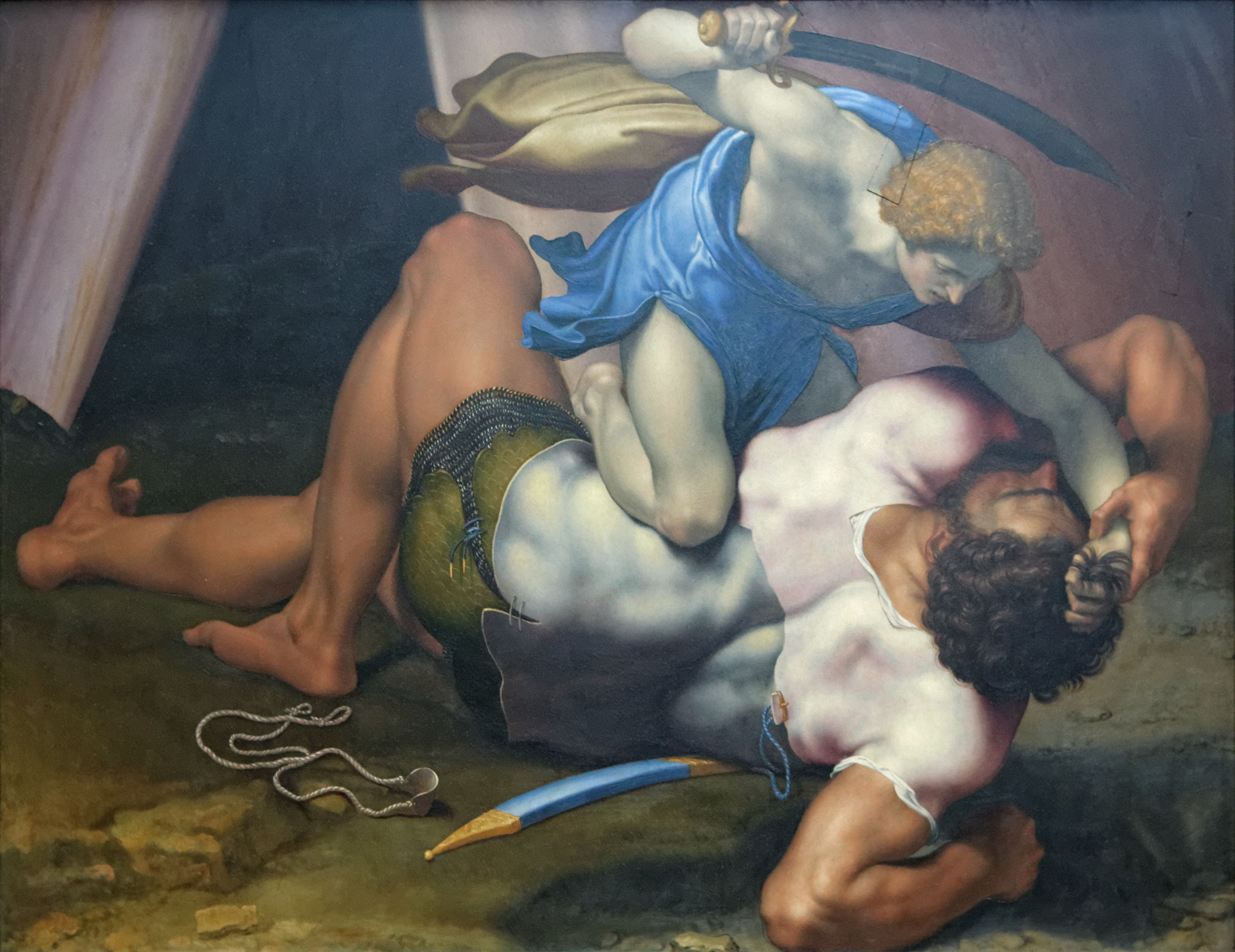
Recto

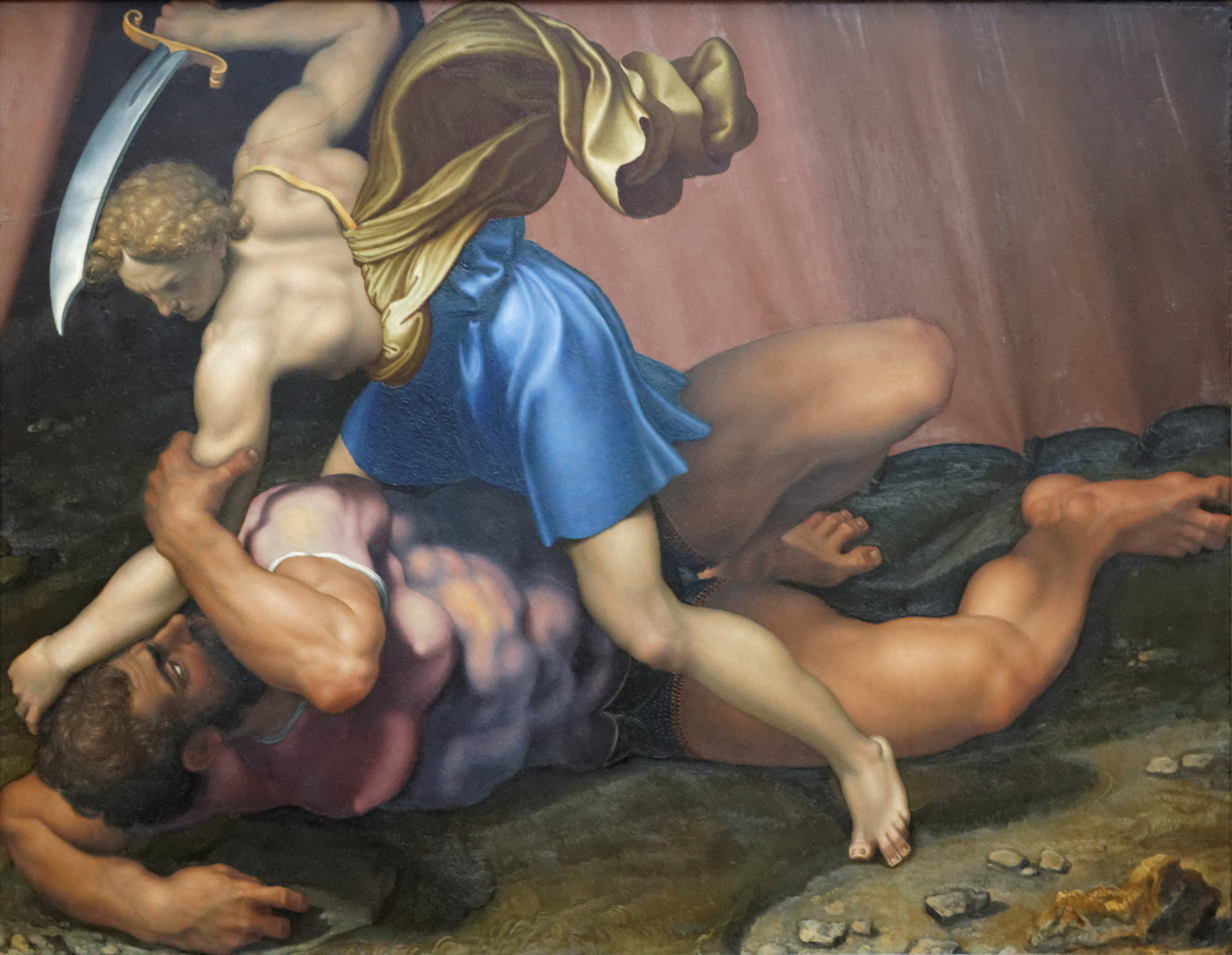
Verso

David and Goliath or David Killing Goliath is a double-sided oil on slate painting by Italian mannerist painter Daniele da Volterra, created c. 1555. It is held in the Louvre, in Paris. Both sides show the same scene.

== History ==
A commission from Italian author Giovanni Della Casa, Archbishop of Benevento, it uses the composition from a drawing by Michelangelo, Volterra's friend and teacher. It shows Volterra engaging with the contemporaneous debate on whether painting or sculpture was the superior art form; being double-sided allowed the work to compete with sculpture. He produced a clay maquette for the work and chose a very large and flat piece of slate. The slate broke during the process of painting, and was repaired with two barely visible tenons.

The work belonged to Annibale Rucellai after the death of Giovanni Della Casa, and was offered nearly two centuries later to Louis XIV on 31 July 1715 as a Michelangelo. It was restored at the Louvre in 2007, repairing rain damage from a storm which broke the glass ceiling at the Château de Fontainebleau.
