= Daniele da Volterra =

Italian painter and sculptor (c. 1509–1566)

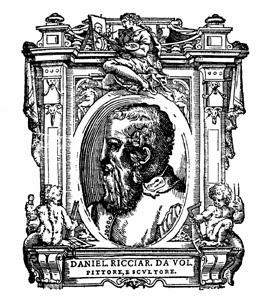
- Daniele da Volterra, in the Lives of Giorgio Vasari
- Born: Daniele Ricciarelli c. 1509; Volterra, Republic of Florence
- Died: 4 April 1566 (aged 56–57); Rome, Papal States
- Known for: Painting
- Movement: Mannerist

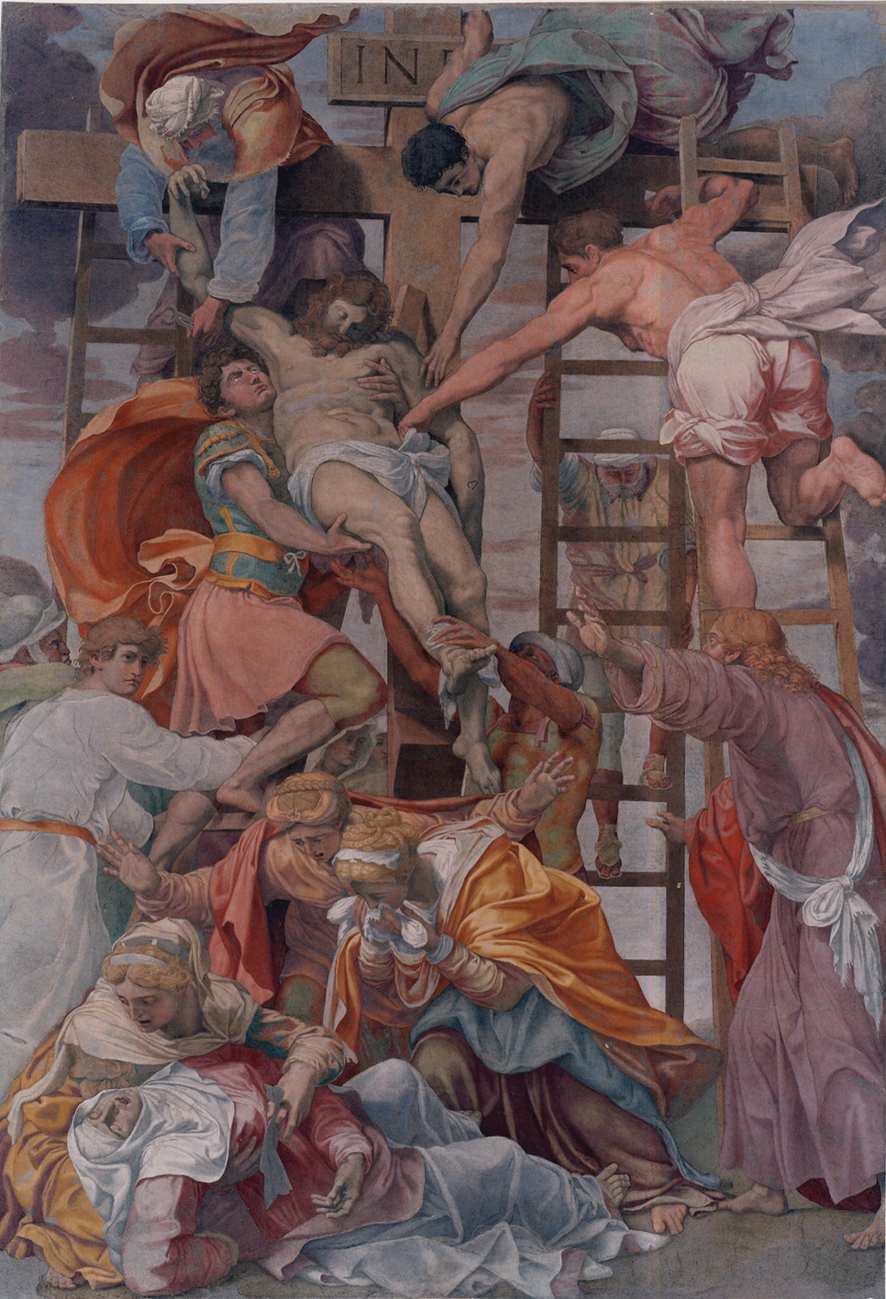
Daniele da Volterra, Descent from the Cross (c. 1545), after its restoration in 2004; Trinità dei Monti, Rome.

Daniele Ricciarelli (Italian: [daˈnjɛːle rittʃaˈrɛlli]; c. 1509 – 4 April 1566), better known as Daniele da Volterra (/voʊlˈtɛrə/, Italian: [daˈnjɛːle da (v)volˈtɛrra]), was a Mannerist Italian painter and sculptor.

He is best remembered for his association with Michelangelo. Several of Daniele's most important works were based on designs made for that purpose by Michelangelo. After Michelangelo's death, Daniele was hired to cover the genitals in his Last Judgment with vestments and loincloths. This earned him the nickname Il Braghettone ("the breeches maker").

== Biography ==
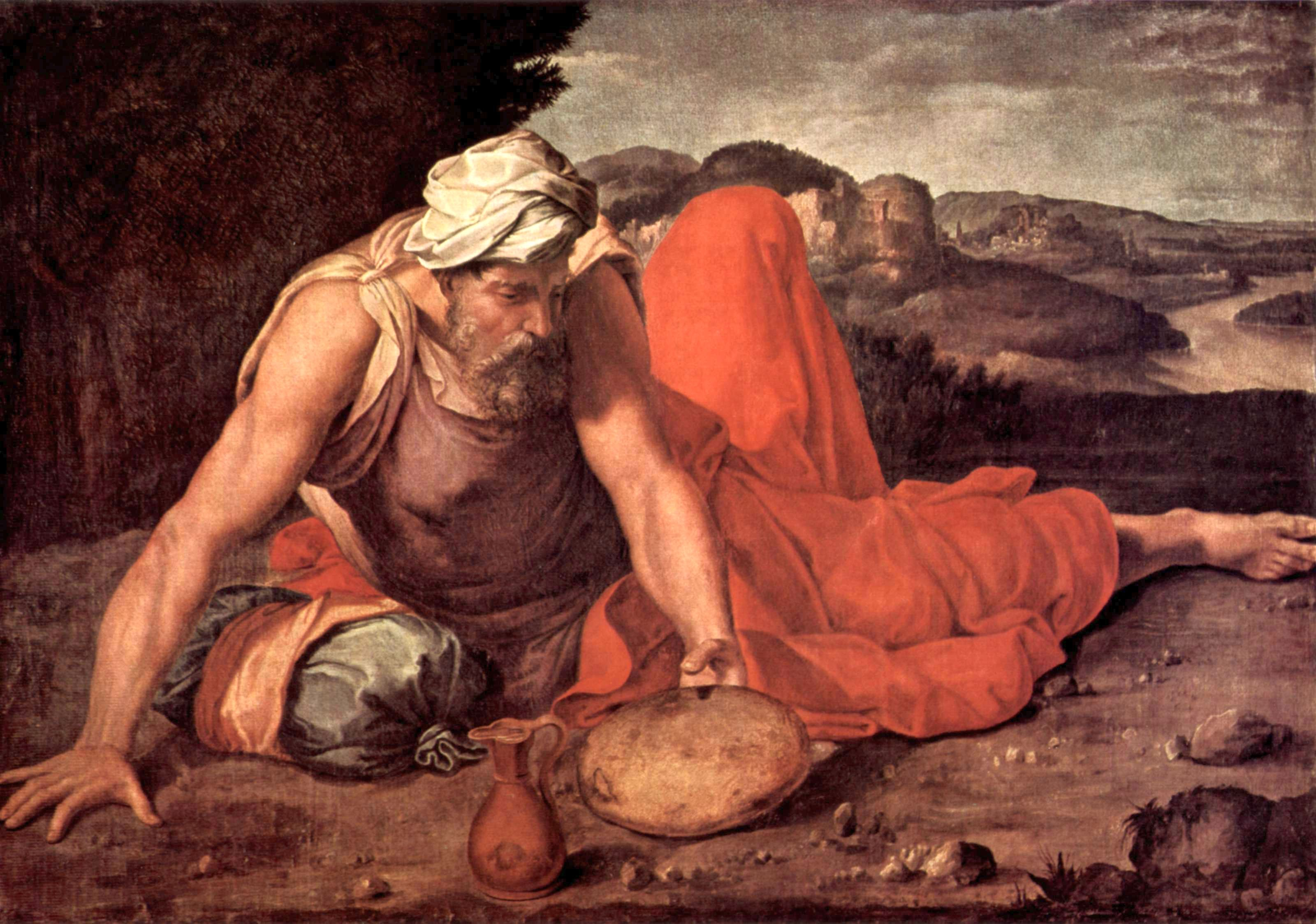
Daniele da Volterra, The Prophet Elias (c. 1550–1560); in the Uffizi Gallery, Florence.

Daniele Ricciarelli was born in Volterra in present-day Tuscany, then part of the Republic of Florence. As a boy, he initially studied with the Sienese artists Il Sodoma and Baldassare Peruzzi, but he was not well received and left them. He appears to have accompanied the latter to Rome in 1535 and helped paint the frescoes in the Palazzo Massimo alle Colonne. He then became an apprentice to Perino del Vaga.

From 1538 to 1541, he helped Perino with the painting of frescoes in the villa of Cardinal Trivuzio at Salone, in the Massimi chapel in Trinità dei Monti, and the chapel of the crucifixion in San Marcello al Corso. He was commissioned to paint a frieze in the main salon of the Palazzo Massimo alle Colonne, with the life of Fabius Maximus.

In Rome, he also started working in the circle of Michelangelo and befriended him. Michelangelo used his influence with Pope Paul III to secure Daniele's commissions and the post of superintendent of the works of the Vatican, a position he retained until the Pope's death. Michelangelo also provided him with sketches on which Daniele based some of his paintings, especially his series of frescoes in the Orsini chapel in the Trinity College, the commission for which Daniele had received in December 1541.

Later, Daniele was commissioned by Paul III to complete the decoration of the Sala Regia. On the death of the pope in 1549, he lost his position as superintendent and the pension to which it entitled him. He then devoted himself chiefly to sculpture.

He died in Rome in 1566. According to Daniele's will, the marble knee of the missing left leg of the Christ from Michelangelo's Deposition was in his possession at the time of his death. Among his pupils was Giulio Mazzoni from Piacenza. Leonardo Ricciarelli was his nephew.

== Works ==
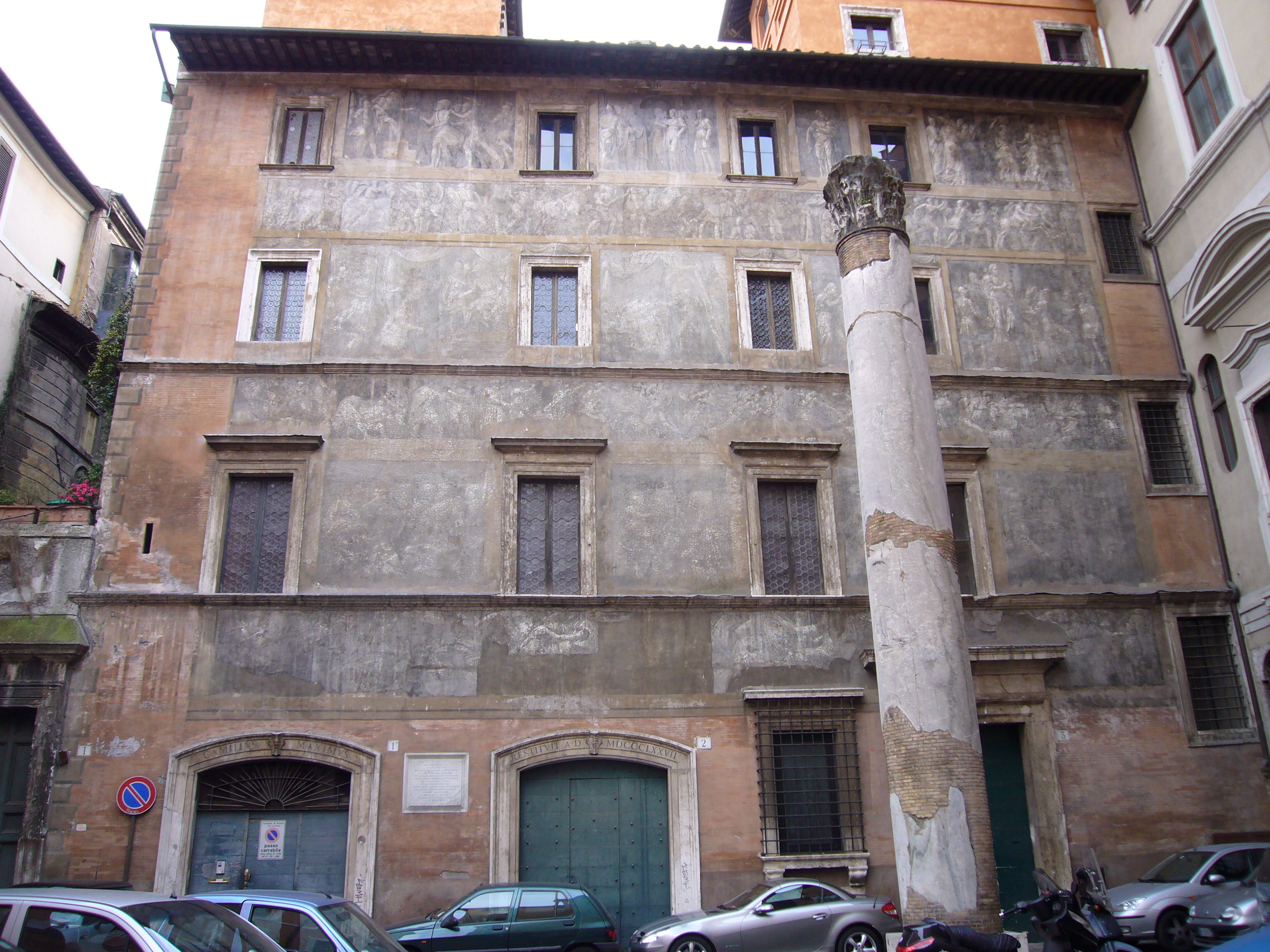
The façade of the Palazzo di Pirro (nowadays part of the Palazzo Massimo alle Colonne) was decorated by Daniele with biblical scenes.

Daniele's best-known painting is the Descent from the Cross in the Trinità dei Monti (c. 1545), after drawings by Michelangelo; by an excess of praise this work was at one time grouped with Raphael's Transfiguration and the Last Communion of St. Jerome by Domenichino as the most famous pictures in Rome. Daniele's two-sided painting of David killing Goliath (restored in 2008) in the Louvre too seems to have been based on Michelangelo's designs; for a long time it was attributed to him.

Other notable works include the Massacre of the Innocents (1557) in the Uffizi Gallery, Florence, a portrait he drew of Michelangelo and a bust he made from Michelangelo's death mask.

A well-known sculpture is the Cleopatra in the Belvedere. From France, Daniele received the commission to make a bronze equestrian statue of Henry II, but he finished only the horse; this was later used for a statue of Louis XIII at the Place Royale and melted down during the French Revolution.

== Style ==
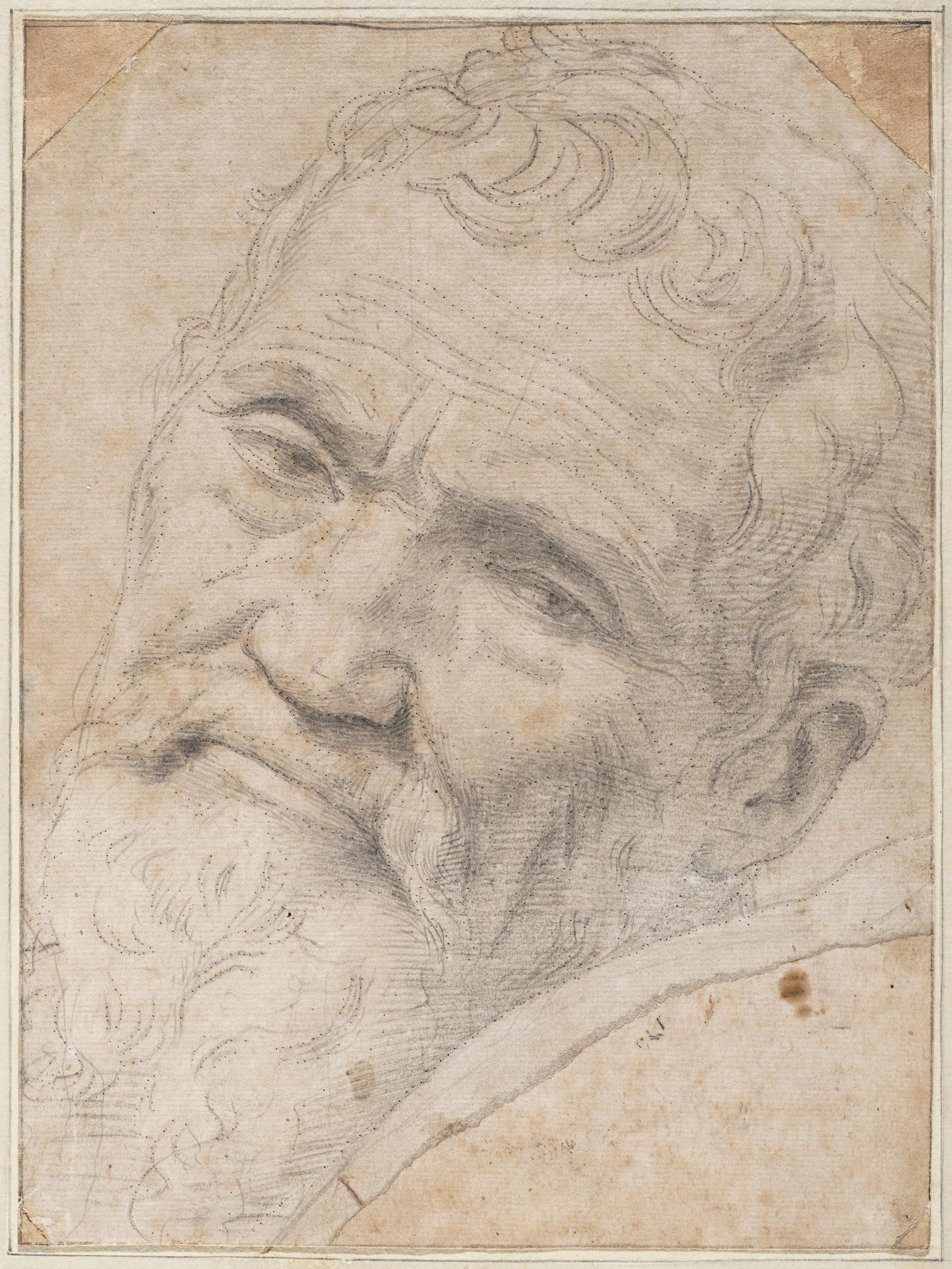
Daniele da Volterra, portrait of Michelangelo; Teylers Museum, Haarlem.

The 1913 Catholic Encyclopedia gave the following description of Daniele's style as a painter:

His work is distinguished by beauty of colouring, clearness, excellent composition, vigorous truth, and curiously strange oppositions of light and shade. Where he approaches closely to Michelangelo, he is an artist of great importance; where he partakes of the sweetness of Sodoma, he becomes full of mannerisms, and possesses a certain exaggerated prettiness. A recent author has wisely said: "He exaggerates Michelangelo's peculiarities, treads on the dangerous heights of sublimity, and, not possessing his master's calm manner, is apt to slip down." His position in present-day criticism is very different to what was given to him a generation ago, and more nearly approaches to a truthful view of his art.

== The loincloths in Michelangelo's Last Judgment ==
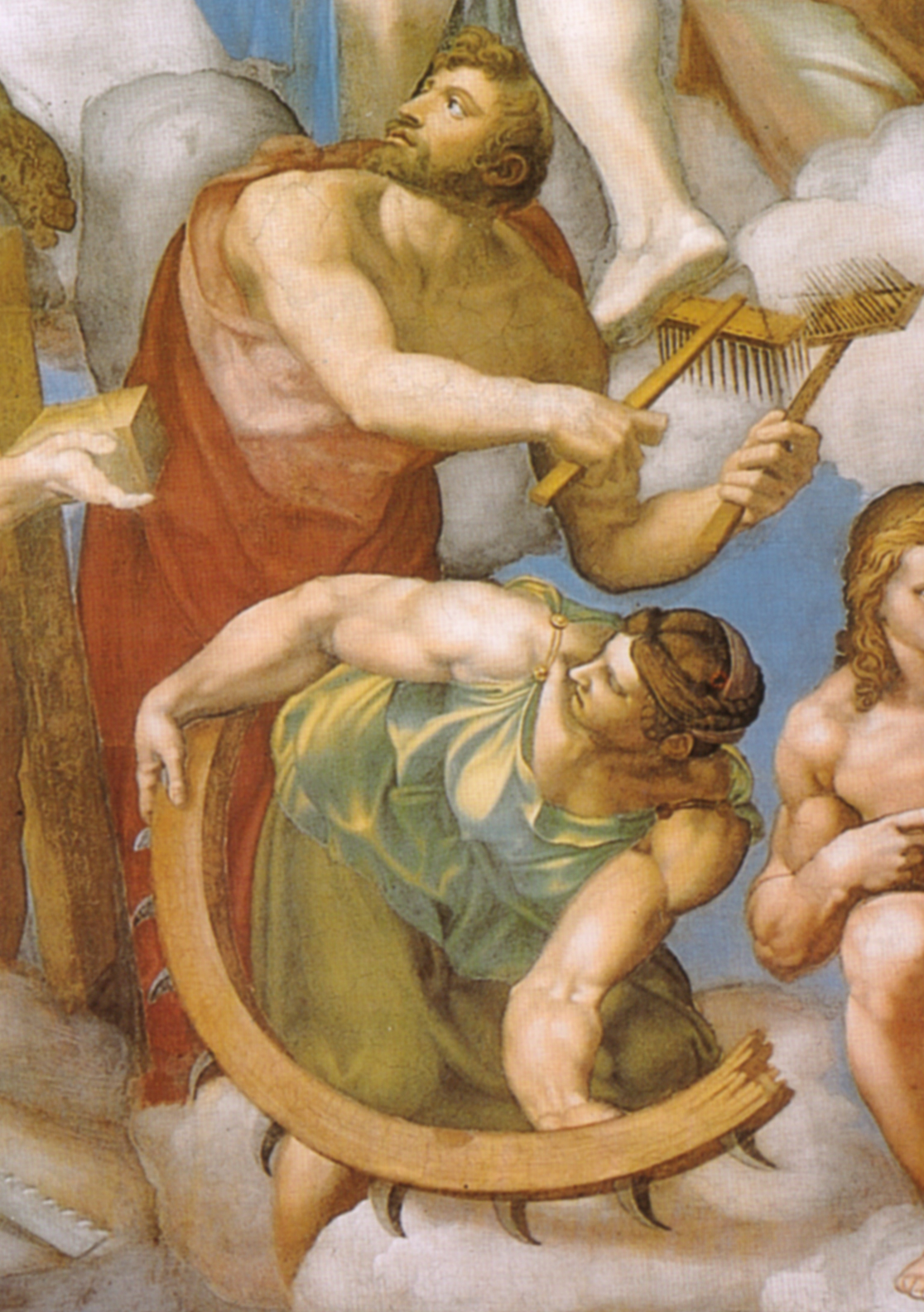
Michelangelo, detail of The Last Judgment (1534–1541). St. Blaise, holding the iron combs of his martyrdom, and the body of St. Catherine of Alexandria, who is holding a breaking wheel, were chiselled away and repainted by Daniele da Volterra in 1565.

Daniele is infamous for having covered over, with vestments and fig-leaves, many of the genitals and backsides in Michelangelo's The Last Judgment fresco in the Sistine Chapel. It was Pope Pius IV who ordered the 'imbraghettamento' (breeching) of the nudes on 21 January 1564. This work was begun in 1565, shortly after the Council of Trent had condemned nudity in religious art. It earned Daniele the nickname "Il Braghettone" ("the breeches-maker").

He also chiselled away a part of the fresco and repainted the larger part of Saint Catherine and the entire figure of Saint Blaise behind her. This was done because in the original version Blaise had appeared to look at Catherine's naked behind, and because to some observers the position of their bodies suggested sexual intercourse.

The loincloths and draperies in the lower half of the fresco, however, were not painted by Daniele. His work on the Last Judgment was interrupted at the end of 1565 by the death of Pope Pius IV, after which the scaffolding he used had to be removed quickly because the chapel was needed for the election of a new pope.

== Legacy ==
His pupils included painter Michele Alberti.

== Gallery ==
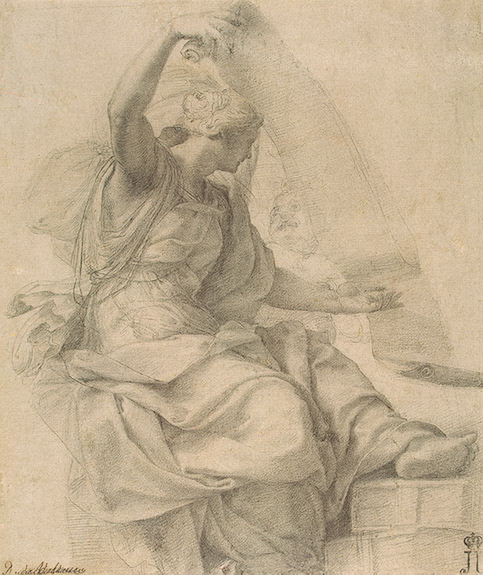
Sybil (c. 1540–1545); Hermitage Museum, Saint Petersburg

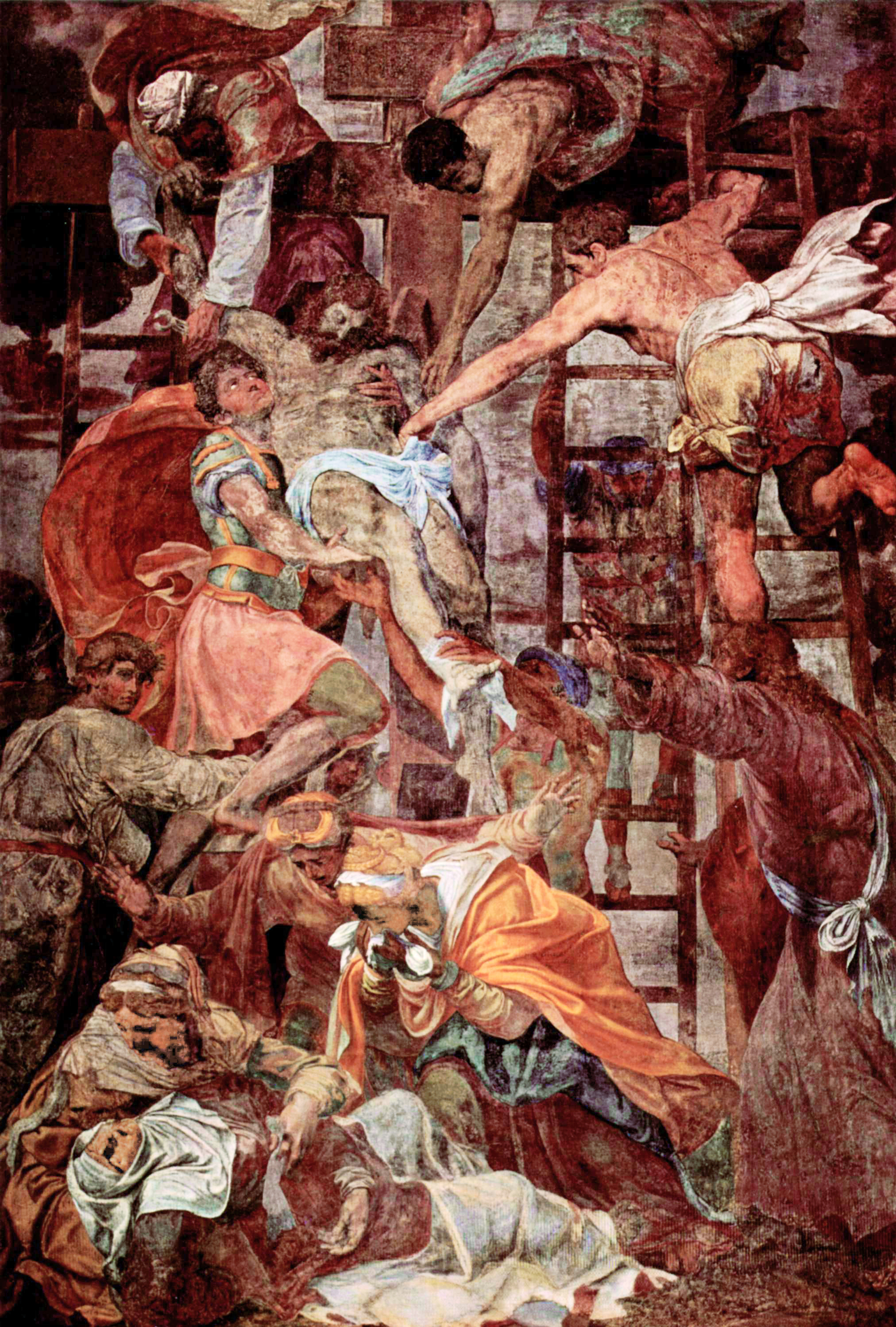
Descent from the Cross (c. 1545), before its 2004 restoration; Trinità dei Monti, Rome

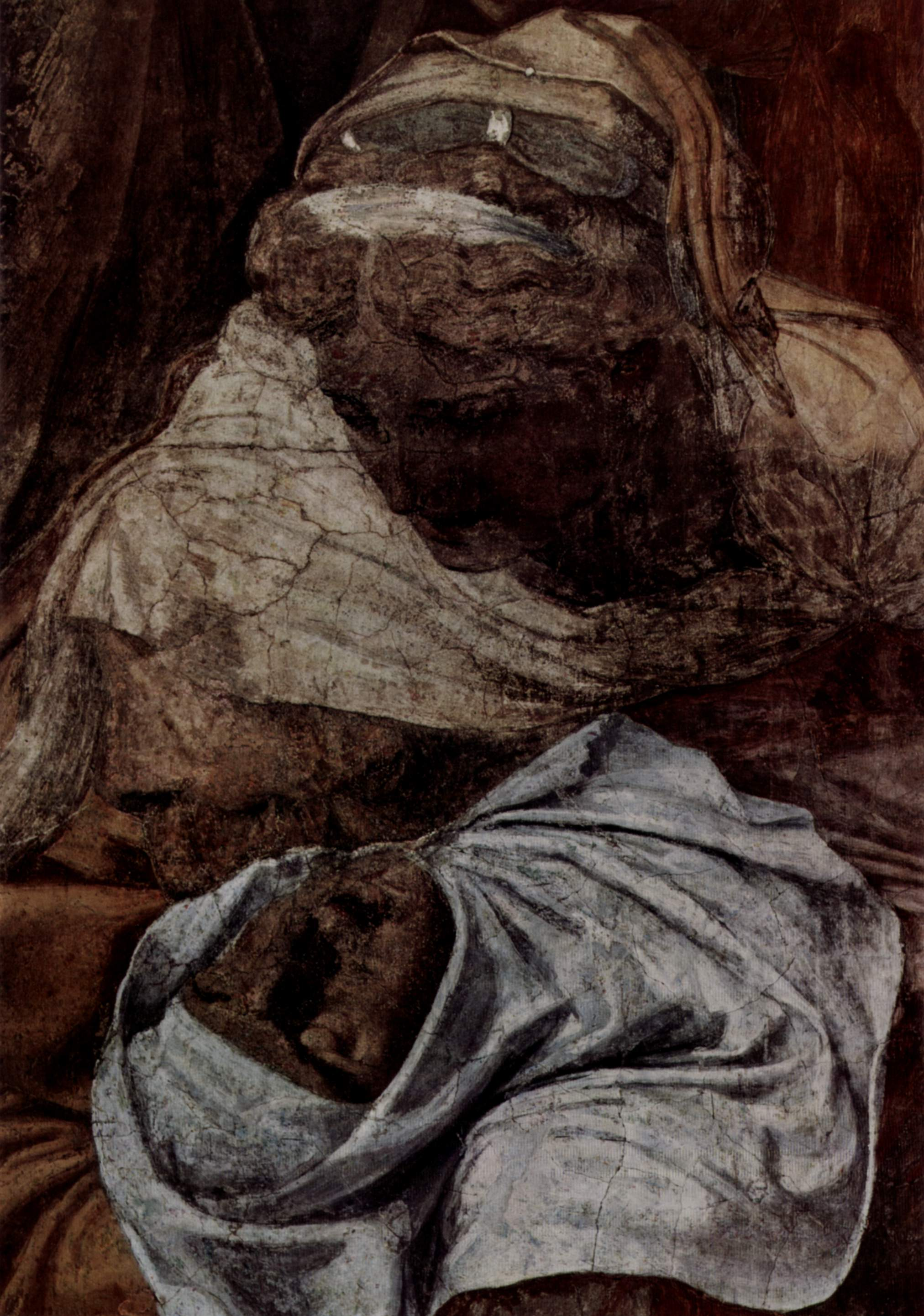
Descent from the Cross (detail, before restoration)

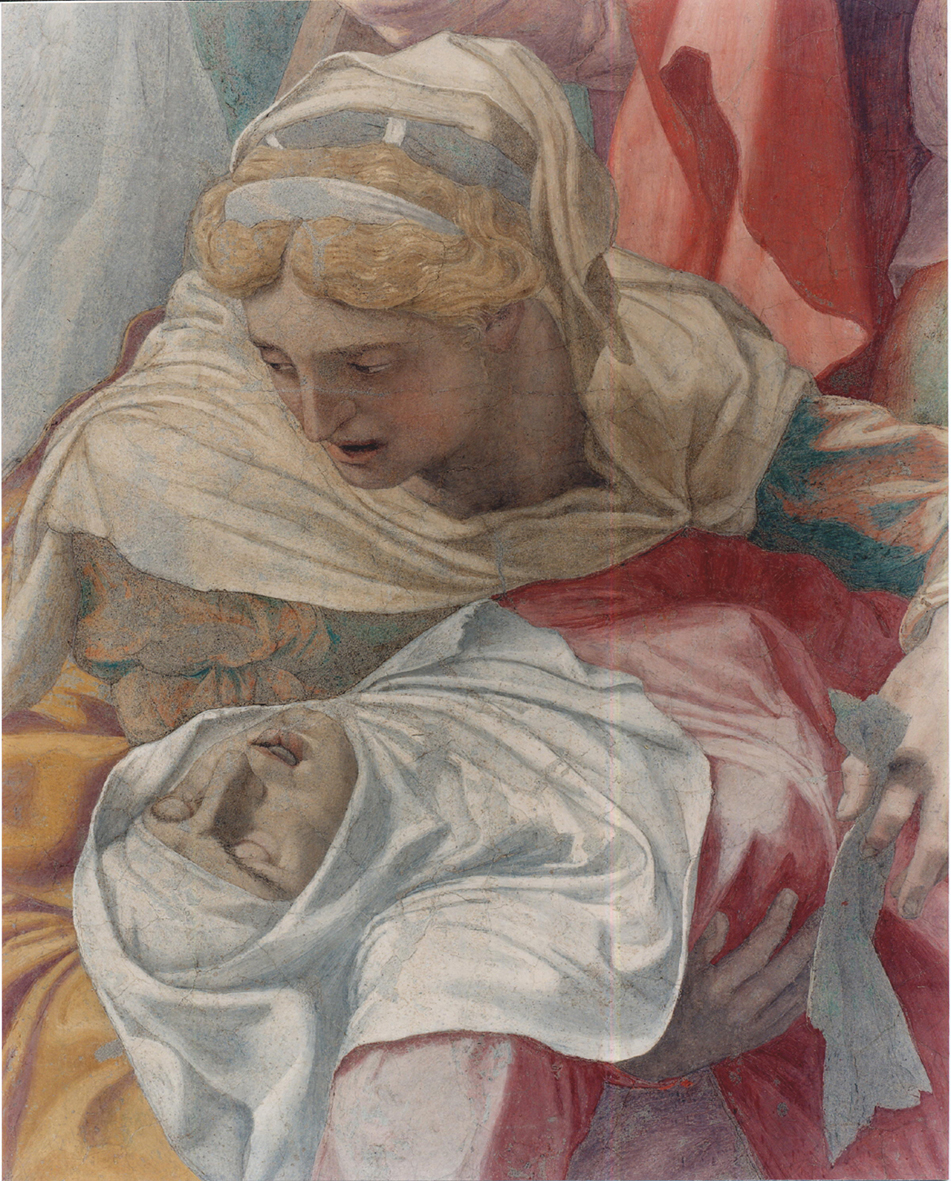
Descent from the Cross (detail, after restoration)

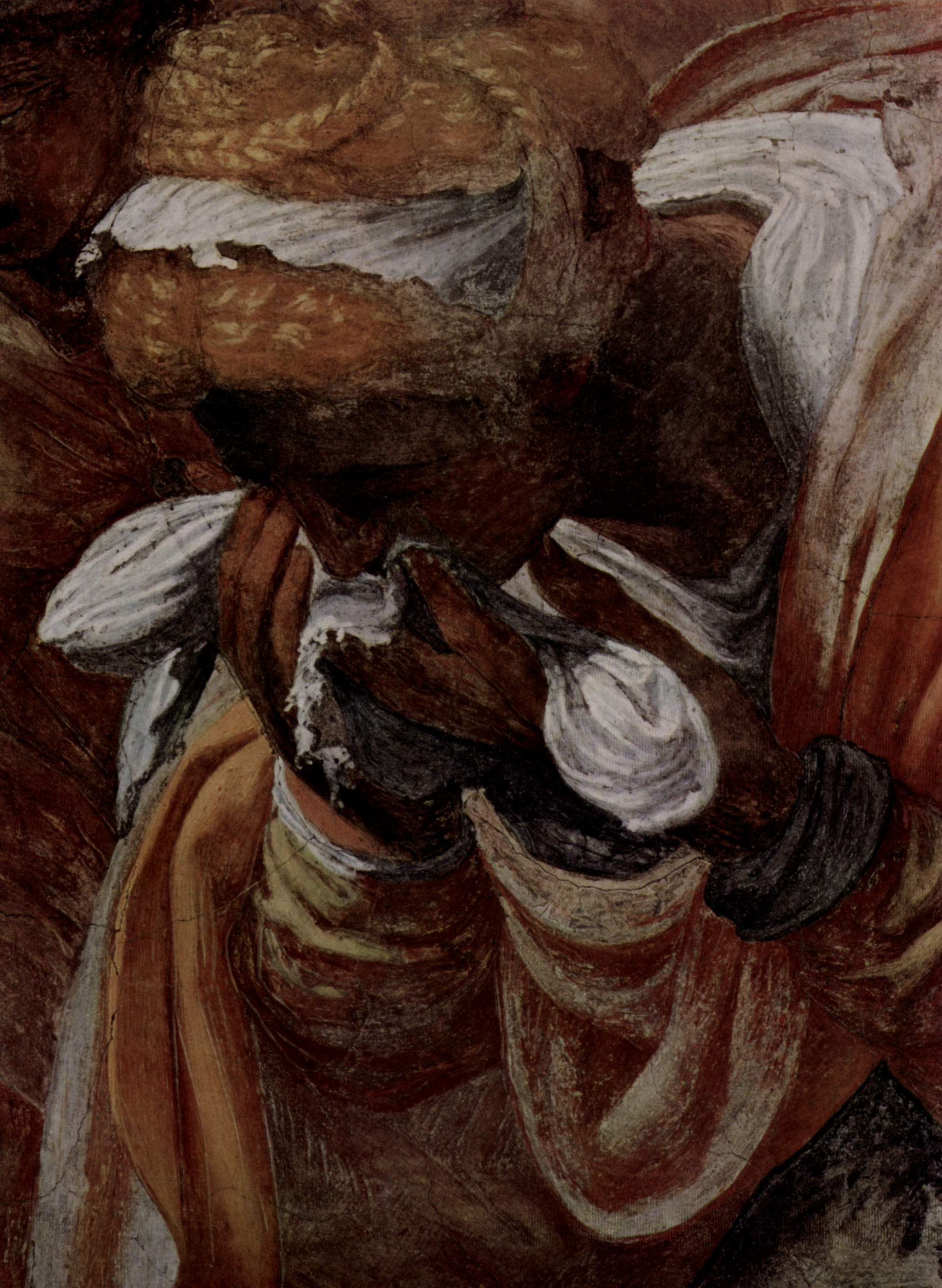
Descent from the Cross (detail, before restoration)

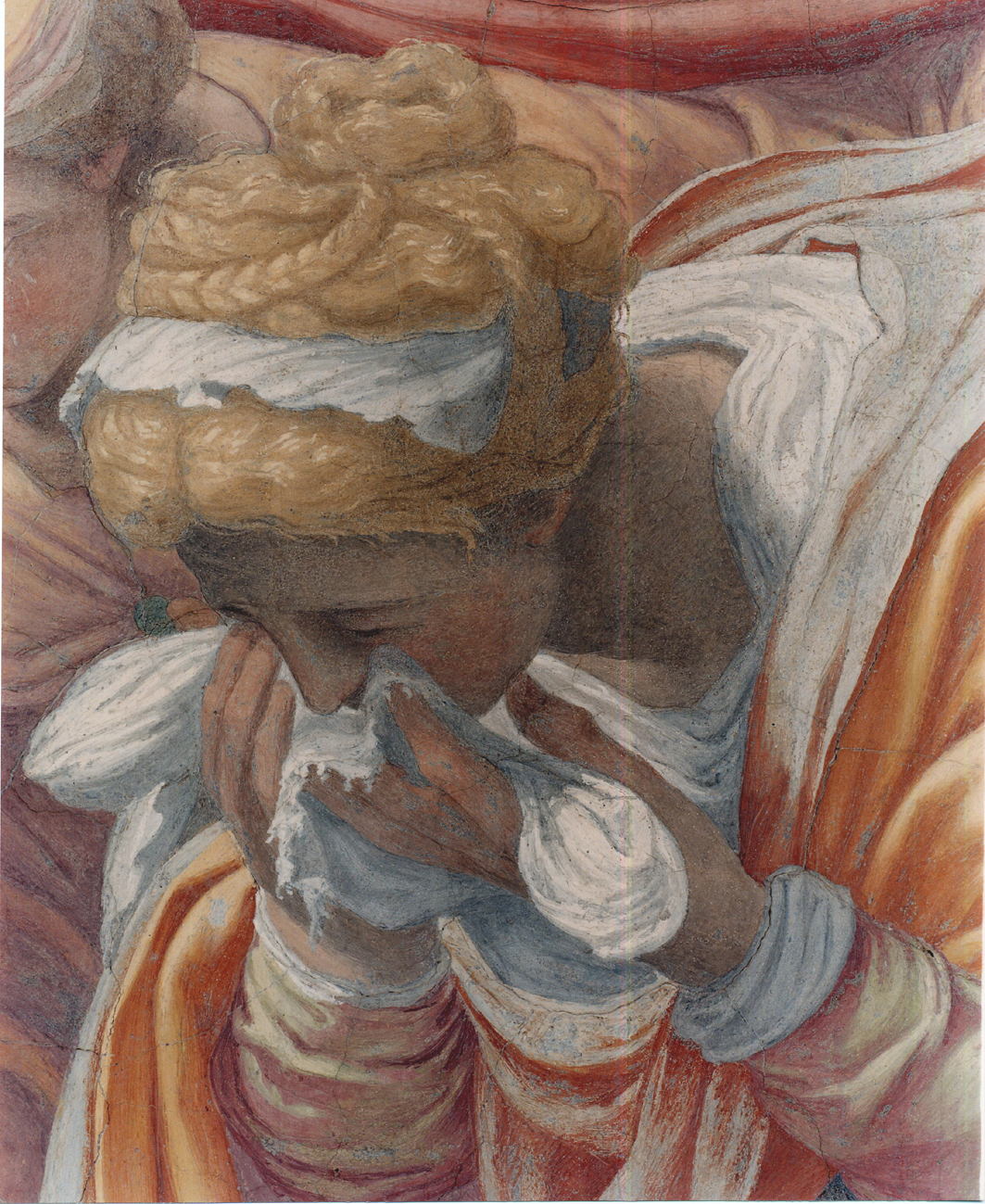
Descent from the Cross (detail, after restoration)

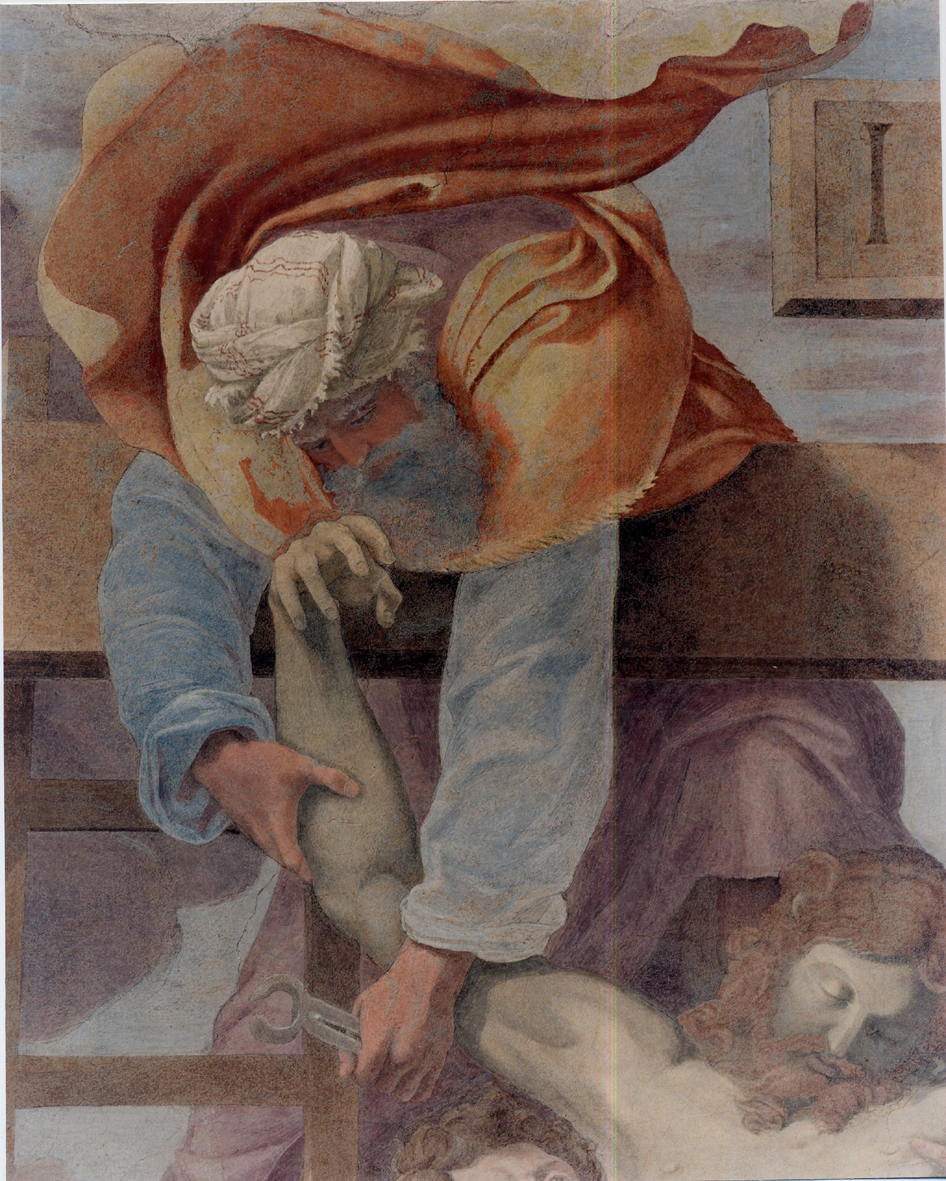
Descent from the Cross (detail, after restoration)

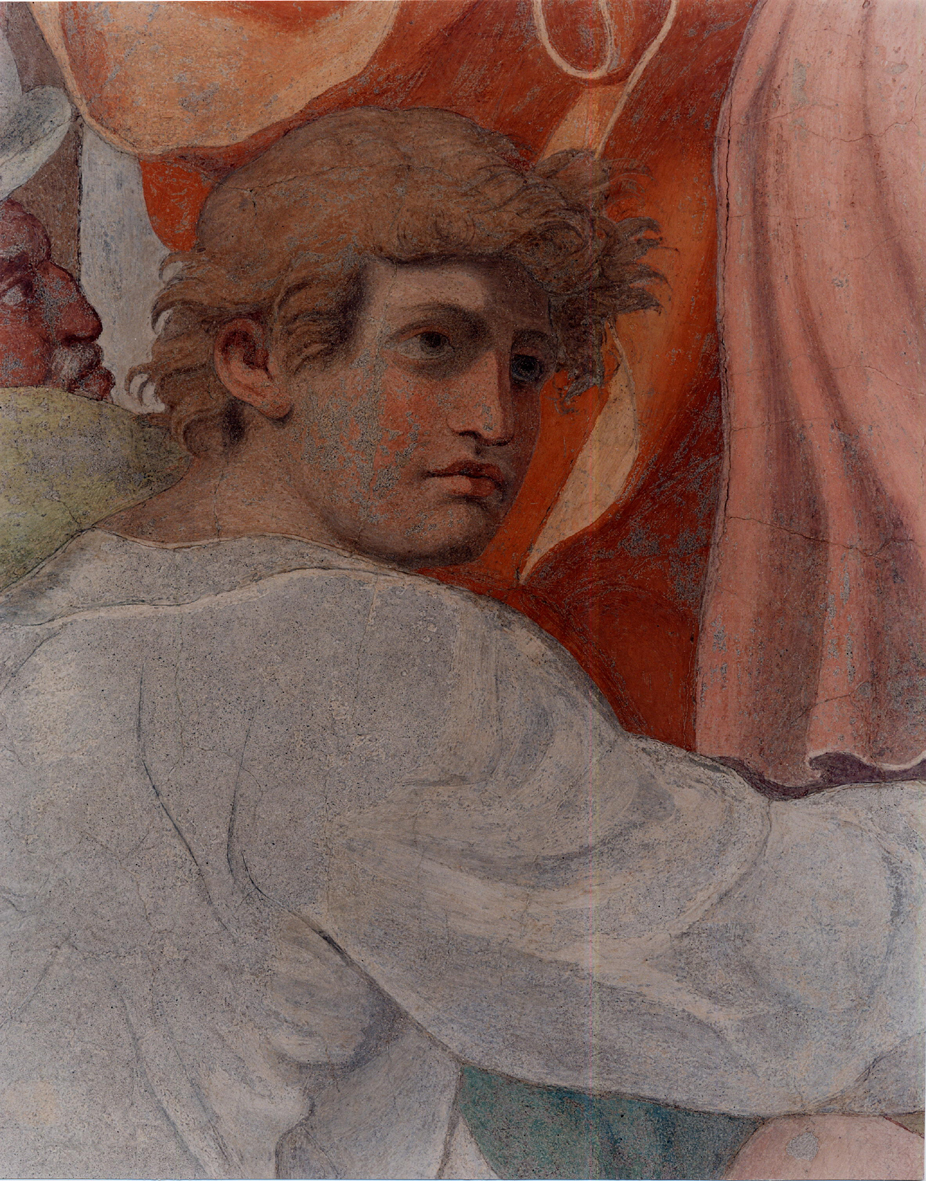
Descent from the Cross (detail, after restoration)

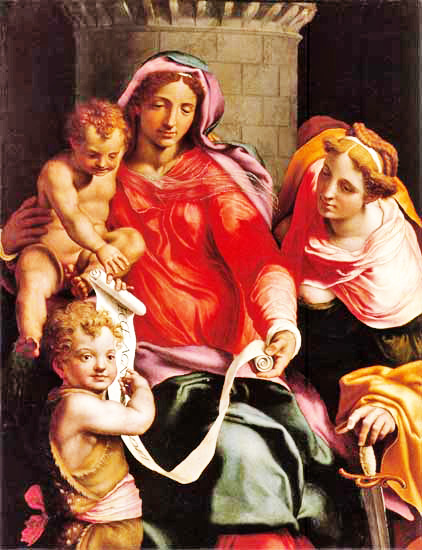
Madonna with Child, young Saint John the Baptist and Saint Barbara (c. 1548); Uffizi, Florence

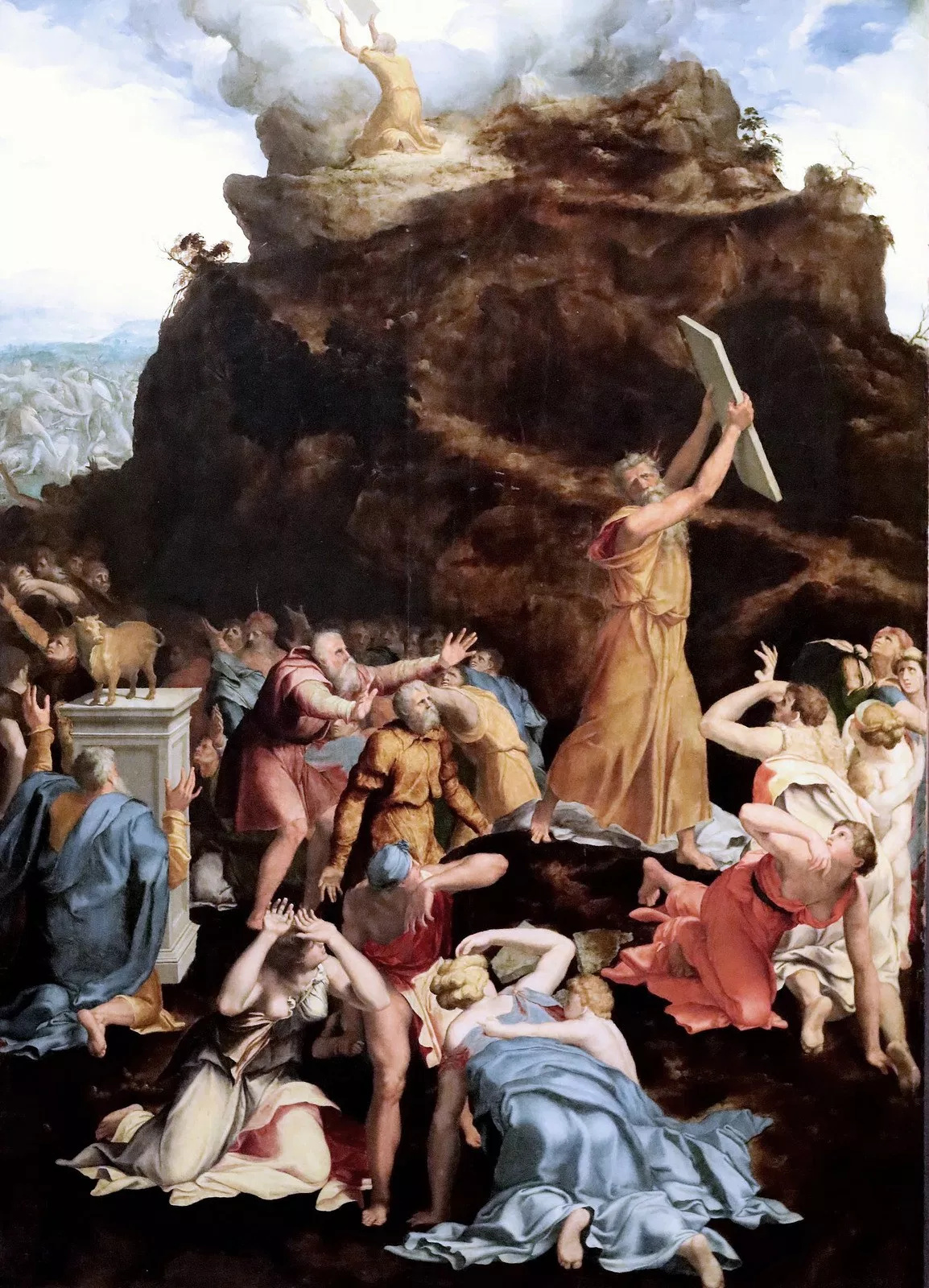
Moses on Mount Sinai (1545–1555); Gemäldegalerie Alte Meister, Dresden

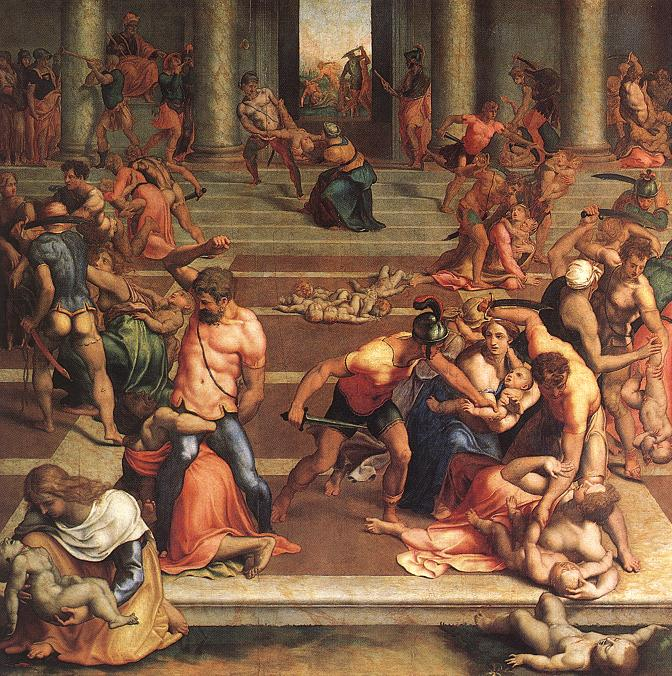
Massacre of the Innocents (c. 1557); Uffizi, Florence

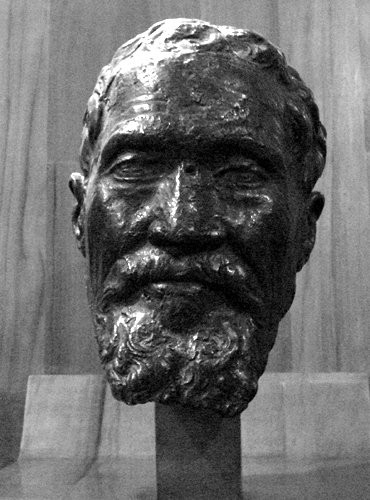
Bronze portrait of Michelangelo (1564), after his death mask; Castello Sforzesco, Milan

== Sources ==
- Fabrizio Mancinelli, "The Painting of the Last Judgment: History, Technique and Restoration". In Loren Partridge, Michelangelo : The Last Judgment – A Glorious Restoration. New York: Harry N. Abrams, Inc. 2000. ISBN 0-8109-8190-4.
