= Pier Maria Baldi =

Italian painter

Pier Maria Baldi (circa 1630 - 9 November 1686) was an Italian painter and architect.

== Biography ==
Born around 1630 in Florence, Pier Maria Baldi trained under Baldassare Franceschini, known as il Volterrano. He worked along with fellow pupil Cosimo Ulivelli in Franceschini's projects, decorating rooms in the Palazzo Giraldi, now Taddei, on via de' Ginori. He had a brother Romualdo Baldi, who was a friend of Franceschini.

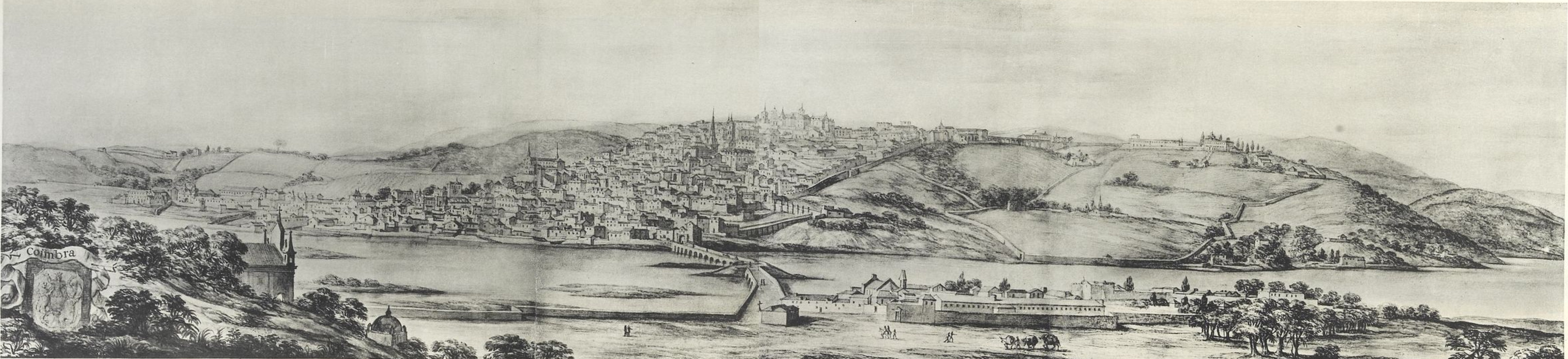
View of Coimbra

In 1667 the Grand Duke Ferdinando II de' Medici recommended Pier Maria to Bernini and Pietro da Cortona in Rome. From September 1668 to March 1669 he was a chamberlain to the future Cosimo III de' Medici, while the latter traveled through Europe, including France, Spain, Portugal, Ireland, England, the Netherlands and Belgium. He documented painted and drawn vedute of this trip, conserved in two volumes in the Biblioteca Laurenziana of Florence. This is a fascinating collection of the skylines of European towns in the 17th century.

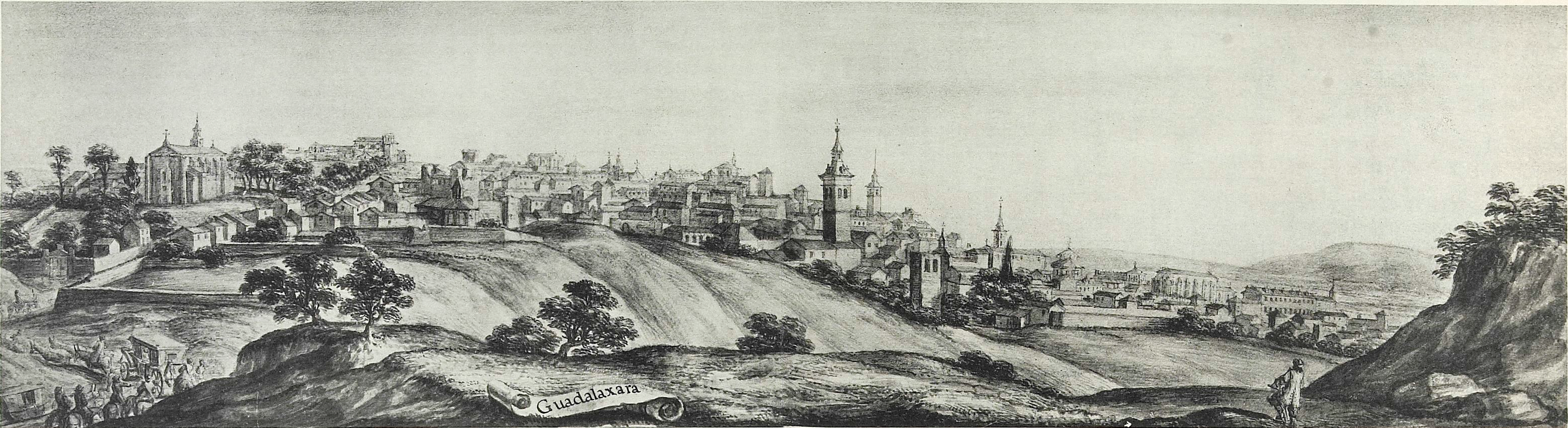
View of Guadalajara, Spain

Among his painted figure pieces are a Madonna of the Rosary and Saint Domenic (circa 1684) for the main altar of San Domenico al Maglio (now belonging to the Scuola di Sanità Militare) and a lunette frescoed with the Baptism of St Augustine in the first cloister of Santo Spirito.

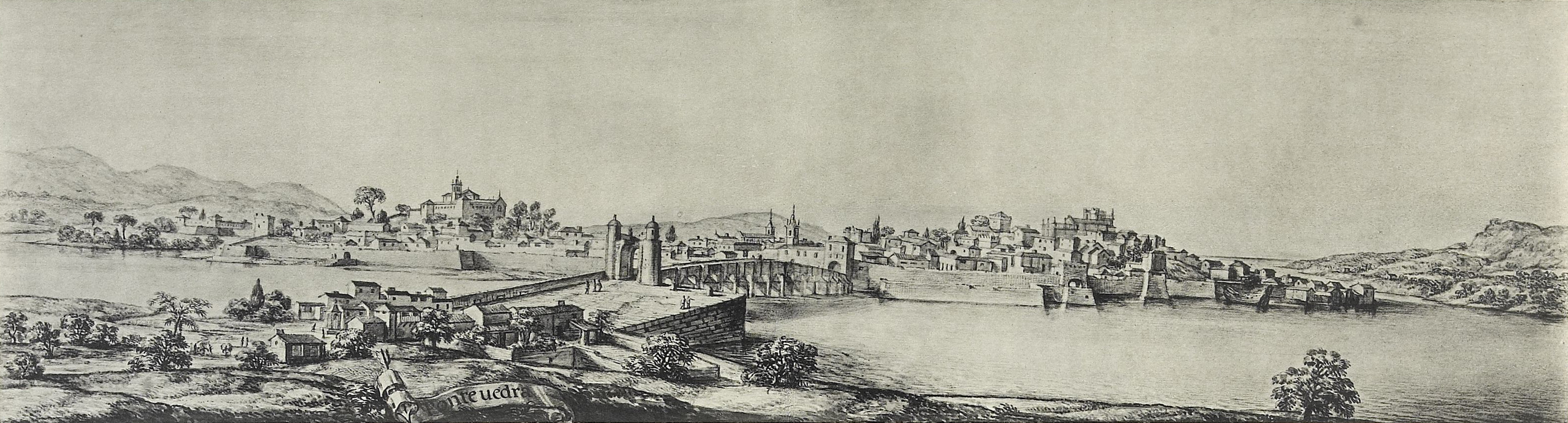
View of Pontevedra in 1669

== Work as an architect ==
He had trained as an architect under Ferdinando Tacca, and joined Tacca's team enlarging the Palazzo Medici Riccardi, which had been purchased by Gabriello Riccardi in 1659. From 1670 to 1684 Baldi designed for him the northward extension of the palazzo along Via Larga. The lobbying of Riccardi, helped obtain in 1670 the appointment of Baldi in 1670 to chief architect to the court of Grand Duke Cosimo III. In 1673 Baldi designed the Fountain in Piazza Santa Croce.

He added the final touches to Tacca's Cappella dei Principi in San Lorenzo. In 1679 he designed for the Grand Duke the church of Santi Quirico, Lucia e Pietro d'Alcantara and its attached convent of the Reformed Friars Minor. The church is near the Medici Villa dell’Ambrogiana and connected to it by a passageway. In 1680, Baldi is recorded as superintendent of the buildings and fortifications of Livorno. He was buried in the cloister of the above convent.

== Notes ==
- Wikimedia commons contains Baldi vedute of Alcalá la Real, Coimbra (above), Montilla, Spain, Las Cinco Llagas, Lisbon, Alcalá de Henares, Guadalajara, Spain (above), Pontevedra (above), Setúbal and Rates.
