= Cecco Bravo =

Italian painter (1601–1661)

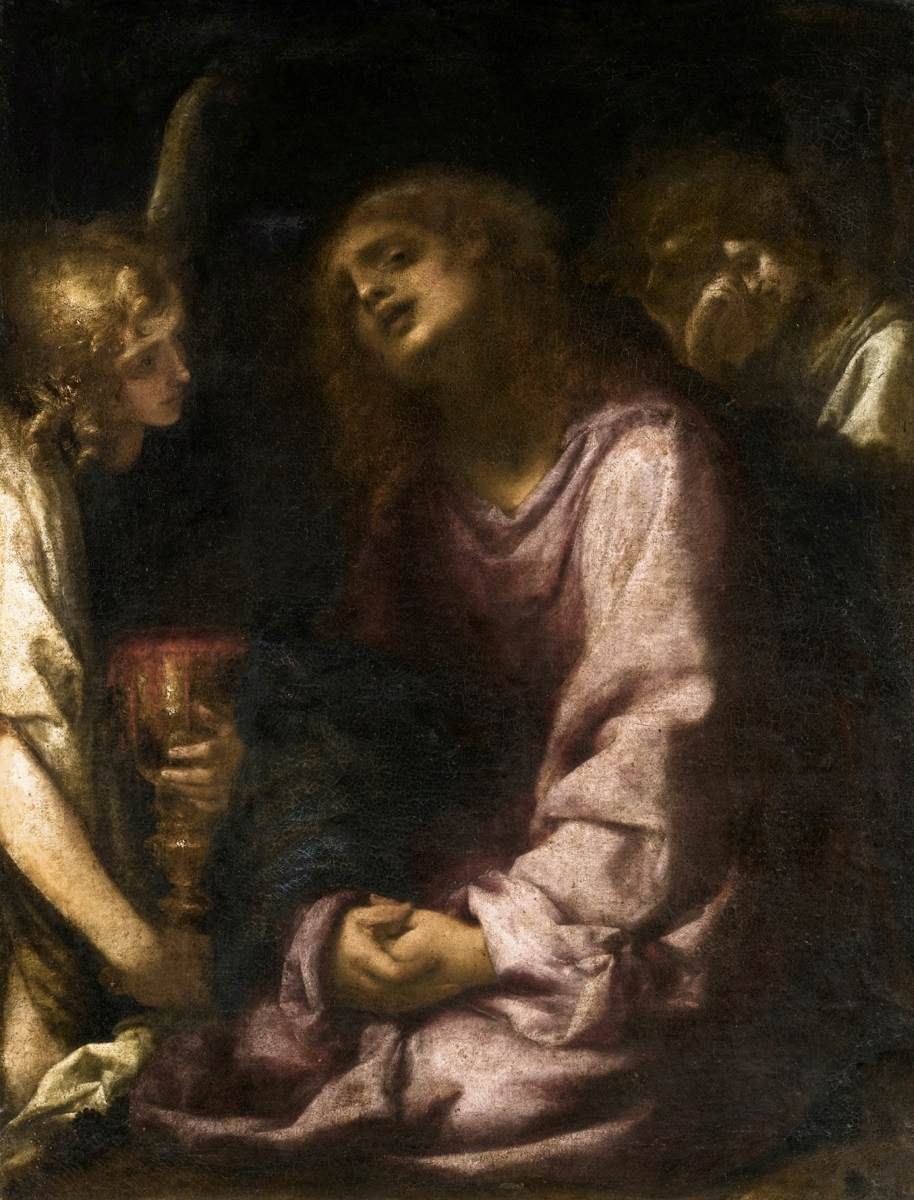
- Christ Supported by Two Angels (1650s), oil on canvas, 132 × 105 cm, priv. col.
- Born: Francesco Montelatici; 15 November 1601; Florence, Duchy of Florence
- Died: 11 December 1661 (aged 60); Innsbruck, Duchy of Austria
- Education: Giovanni Bilivert; Sigismondo Coccapani; Matteo Rosselli
- Known for: Painting
- Movement: Baroque

Francesco Montelatici, best known as Cecco Bravo (15 November 1601 – 11 December 1661), was an Italian painter of the Florentine Baroque school. Bravo was a profoundly original and anti-conformist artist. Miles Chappell described his works as "almost a painterly inversion of the Florentine tradition of rigorous disegno, with their deep, at times passionate expression, forceful figures and impetuous definition with a loaded brush."

== Biography ==
Cecco Bravo was born in Florence to Antonio di Giovanni Montelatici and his wife Polita di Domenico Baggiani. He trained with Giovanni Bilivert and Sigismondo Coccapani. In the early 1620s he worked in the studio of Matteo Rosselli. Bravo began working independently from at least 1624, as evidenced by several entries in the records of the Accademia delle Arti del Disegno. On 14 February 1625, Archdeacon Pietro Niccolini, who would become Archbishop of Florence in 1632, commissioned him an altarpiece for the church of San Simeone. The work depicts Saint Nicholas saving three young men unjustly condemned to death and is now in a private collection. For this first documented commission, Bravo used Bilivert's 1621 painting of St. Helena Adoring the Cross in the church of Santa Croce, Florence, as his model, particularly drawing on its elegance of draftsmanship and brilliant use of colour, both of which are hallmarks of the Florentine pictorial tradition.

During these same years, Bravo began working for the Servite Order, with whom he developed an increasingly close relationship. The archival records of the Servite Convent of the Santissima Annunziata, Florence, reveal that, between 1625 and 1630, he produced eight portraits, now lost, of the Seven Holy Founders of the Servite Order, commissioned by the Servite friar Ridolfo Gugliantini.

By 1629, he had his own independent studio. His first recorded work is a fresco of the Virgin, St. John and Angels (c. 1628-9; San Marco, Florence) and a painting of Charity (Annunziata of Florence). These works are deeply influenced by Florentine Mannerist painters, particularly Andrea del Sarto and Pontormo. Between 1632 and 1635 he took part in the decoration of the Chapel of St. Luke in the Servite Convent of the Santissima Annunziata, Florence, a project promoted by Fra' Serafino Lupi to honour the memory of the general of the Order Angelo Maria Montorsoli. For the chapel, Bravo painted canvases depicting Montorsoli kneeling before a crucifix amid the three vows of obedience, poverty, and chastity, represented by women crowning him. Although the works themselves are lost, a detailed account of them survives, drawn up in 1701 during the renovation of the chapel. In 1633, Bravo decorated the church of Santissima Annunziata in Pistoia with six lunettes depicting the Life of the Blessed Bonaventura Bonaccorsi, continuing a series begun by Bernardino Poccetti. He painted a frieze depicting children’s Games and stories from Orlando Furioso (c. 1631) for Villa Corsini a Mezzomonte in Impruneta.

Lorenzo welcomes Apollo and the Muses, fresco by Cecco Bravo on the south wall of the Sala degli Argenti in Palazzo Pitti

In July 1636, Bravo was commissioned to decorate the library in the Casa Buonarroti of Florence. After his depiction of Fame on the ceiling of the library, he became disenchanted with the patron’s excessive instructions, and the panels of illustrious Florentines on the walls were completed by others, including Domenico Puligo and Matteo Rosselli (1636). In October 1628, he was commissioned to complete work initiated by Giovanni da San Giovanni (who died after starting) for the Sala degli Argenti in Palazzo Pitti. The commission was shared with the Florentine Baroque painters Ottavio Vannini and Francesco Furini. The frescoes, intended to celebrate Lorenzo de' Medici, were commissioned in 1635 by Ferdinando II de' Medici in preparation for his marriage with Vittoria della Rovere, celebrated publicly in July 1637. The three artists significantly altered the original iconographic plan devised by San Giovanni. On the south wall, Bravo completed Lorenzo as messenger of peace and Lorenzo welcomes Apollo and the Muses, which glorify Lorenzo de' Medici for welcoming exiled scholars and artists to Florence, ushering in a new Golden Age of peace and cultural prosperity. The elegance of the scenes draws inspiration from the refined style of Francesco Furini, while the use of fluid and transparent colours is reminiscent of Pietro da Cortona's work in the Sala della Stufa.

Between the end of 1639 and the beginning of 1640, Bravo was part of a team that frescoed quadri riportati on the walls of the Oratorio dei Vanchetoni, Florence. The Oratorio also contains frescoes by San Giovanni, Pietro Liberi and Baldassare Franceschini (il Volterrano). For the Oratory, Bravo painted the ceiling fresco with St. Zanobi, St. Antonino and St. Charles Borromeo, notable for its dramatic perspective layout, luminous atmosphere, and theatrical Baroque composition.

On 26 November 1656, Bravo was awarded the title of Maestro del Naturale (Master of Life Drawing) by the Accademia delle Arti del Disegno. The position was offered to Bravo after fellow Florentine painter Simone Pignoni stepped down and declined the role. As Maestro del Naturale, Montelatici was responsible for overseeing life-drawing classes (disegno dal naturale), an important component of academic artistic training. In 1659, Cecco was recommended by the Cardinal Leopoldo de' Medici for a position as a court painter to Anna, wife of the archduke Ferdinand Karl of the Tyrol. He accepted and spent the last two years of his life in Innsbruck, moved to Tyrol on 1 June 1660. Of the works produced during his time in Austria, only the canvas depicting Aurora (Vienna, Kunsthistorisches Museum) and the Portrait of Ferdinand Charles (Innsbruck, Ambras Castle) survive. Bravo died in Innsbruck on 11 December 1661, aged 60.

One of his patrons was Filippo Baldinucci, but Bravo was not included in his biographies of Florentine artists. This absence is explained by Baldinucci's death in 1696, by which time only three of the six volumes that make up his Notizie had been published. Consequently, Bravo fell out of favour with historiography, and for a long time his work was only remembered through brief mentions in Florentine guidebooks and eighteenth-century scholarly literature. In the final decades of the 20th century, renewed interest in his work led to a more in-depth study of Bravo’s biography and art.

== Style ==
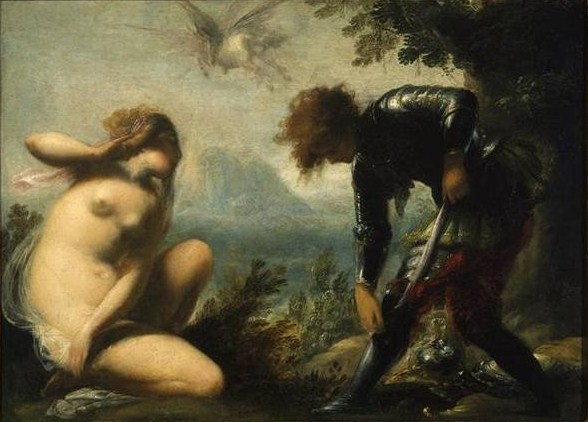
Angelica and Ruggiero, scene from Ariosto's Orlando Furioso, c. 1640, oil on canvas, 31.1 × 43.2 cm, Smart Museum of Art, Chicago

Bravo is one of the few Florentines to violate the crisp drawn edges of figures, and aim for a general bravura of execution, nearly becoming a pintore del tocco. Some attribute this to influences he encountered in Venice, for example, Bernardo Strozzi. Cecco Bravo influenced Felice Ficherelli (il Riposo). Howard Hibbard contrasted the murky sensuality of the paintings of Pignoni, Furini and Bravo with the piety of Carlo Dolci.

The art historian Anne Barsanti described Cecco's "characteristic compositional scheme" as one in which "the main figures (usually two), expressing themselves in anxious or excited gestures, are placed against a background full of incident but lacking real depth; flashes of light emphasise the dreamlike atmosphere".

Cecco was a prolific draftsman whose drawings, usually executed in red and black chalk, use a flurry of broken lines to create a rich chiaroscuro. The largest collections of his drawings are in the Department of Prints and Drawings at the Uffizi, the Biblioteca Marucelliana in Florence, the Louvre in Paris, and the Scottish National Gallery in Edinburgh. Bravo's drawings primarily consist of nudes, executed with a rapid, fragmented line and featuring strong chiaroscuro, in open defiance of Renaissance drawing practices. Notable for their intensely visionary quality are the large sheets called sogni (dreams) by Niccolò Gabburri, who acquired them from the Baldinucci collection (Florence, Uffizi, Frederikssund, Willumsens Museum, Chicago, Art Institute, Washington, D.C., National Gallery of Art).

=== Gallery ===
Armida, Uffizi, Florence

Aurora Surrounded by Genii, Kunsthistorisches Museum, Vienna

The Rape of Proserpina, Kunsthistorisches Museum, Vienna

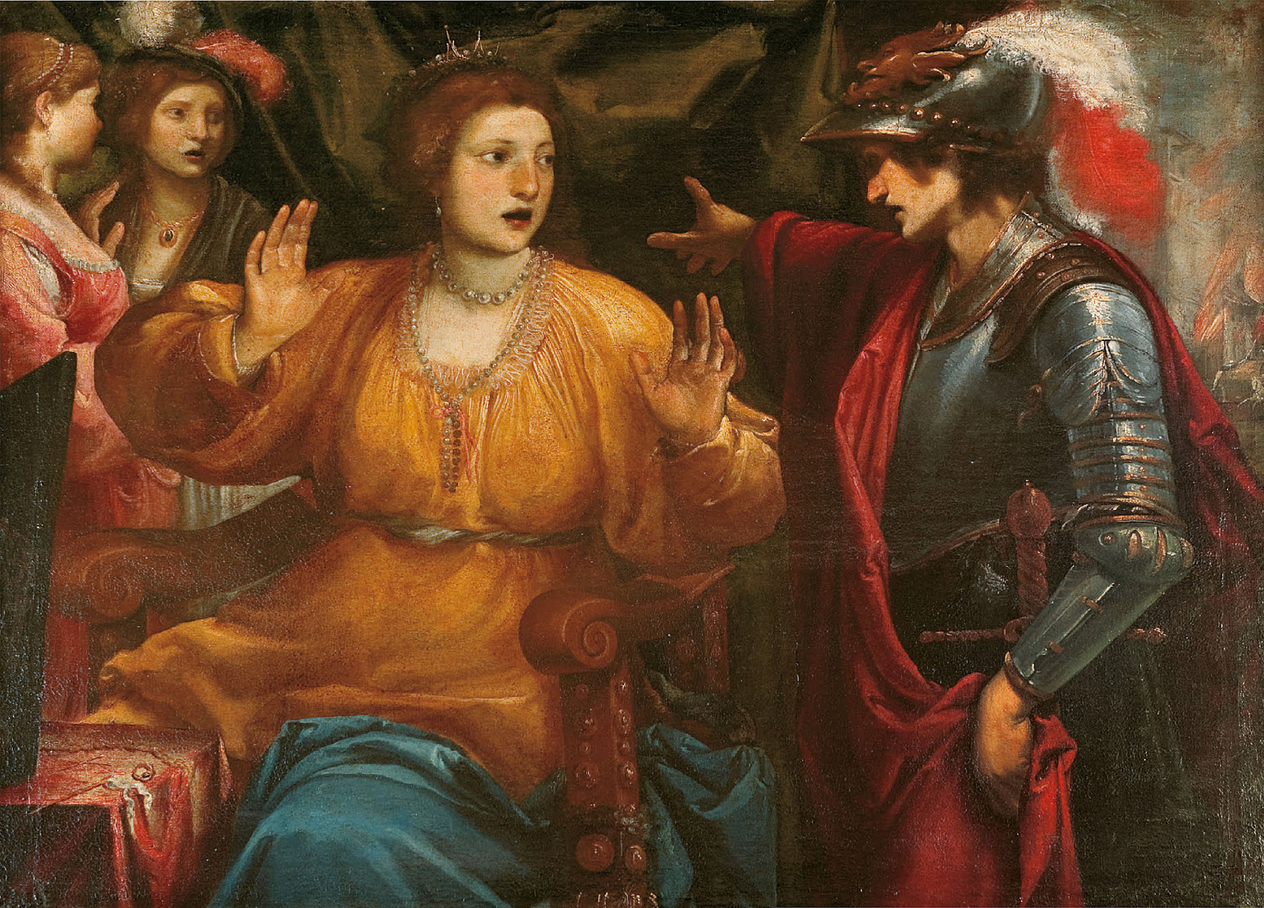
Semiramis, Uffizi, Florence

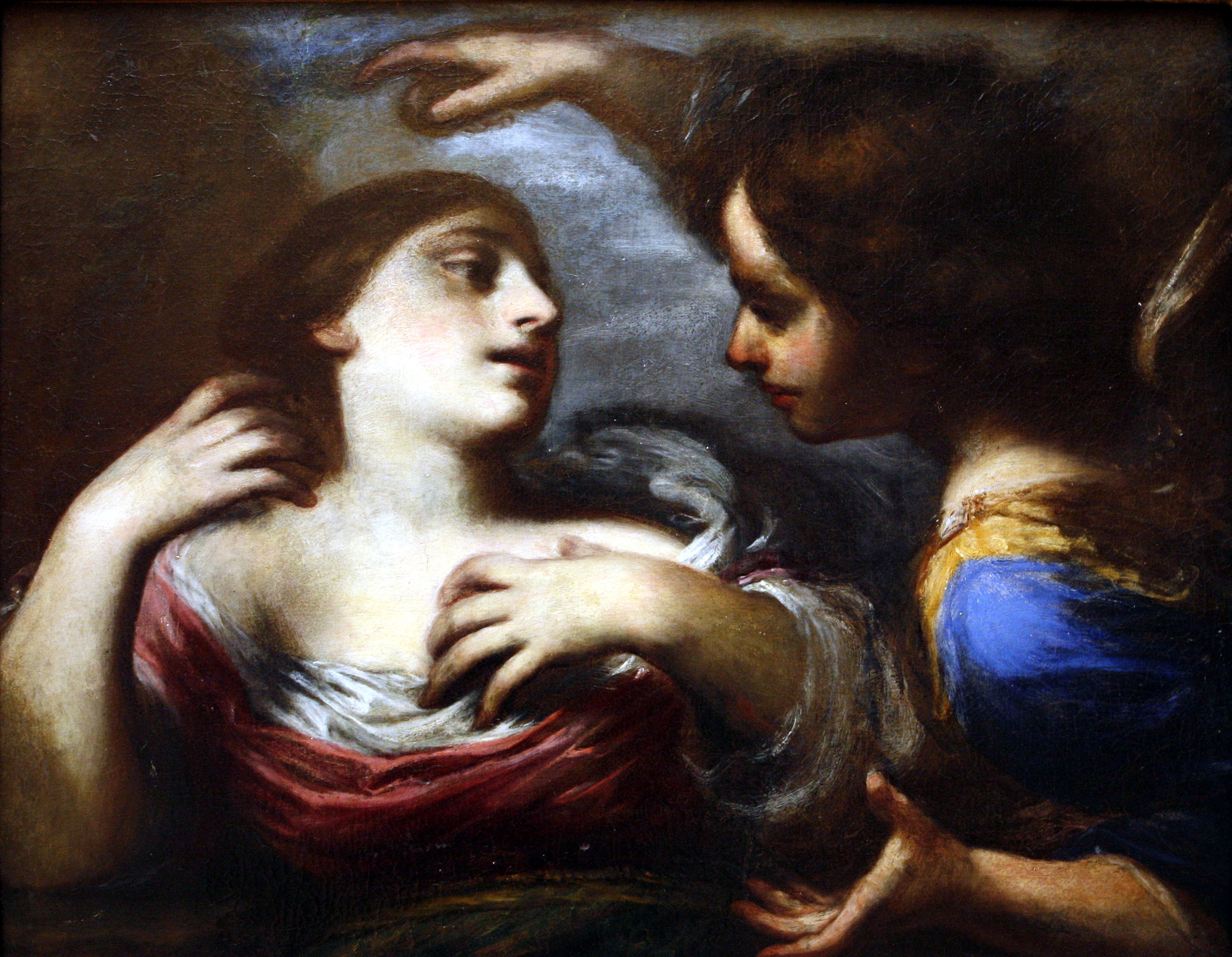
Hagar and the Angel, Musée des Beaux-Arts de Dijon

Erminia and the Shepherds, Museo Civico, Pistoia

Odysseus and Nausicaa, Galleria Canesso, Milan

The Death of Cleopatra, Bowes Museum

== Bibliography ==
- Ewald, Gerhard (1960). "Hitherto Unknown Works by Cecco Bravo". The Burlington Magazine. 102 (689): 343–352. JSTOR 873040.
- Ewald, Gerhard (1961). "Addenda to Cecco Bravo". The Burlington Magazine. 103 (701): 346-351+353. JSTOR 873449.
- Chappell, Malcolm (1966). "Medici Patronage and the Baroque: A Reappraisal". The Art Bulletin. 48 (2): 133–166. doi:10.1080/00043079.1966.10788937.
- Chappell, Miles (1999). "Cecco Bravo. Florence". The Burlington Magazine. 141 (1159): 646–647. JSTOR 888547.
- Anna Barsanti; Roberto Contini, eds. (1999). Cecco Bravo pittore senza regola. Firenze 1601-Innsbruck 1661 (in Italian). Exh. cat. Milan: Electa. ISBN 978-8843569779.
- Barsanti, Anne (2003). "Cecco Bravo [Montelatici, Francesco]". Grove Art Online. Oxford: Oxford University Press. doi:10.1093/gao/9781884446054.article.T015065.
- Da Gai, Valerio (2012). "MONTELATICI, Francesco, detto Cecco Bravo". Dizionario Biografico degli Italiani (in Italian). Vol. 76: Montauti–Morlaiter. Rome: Institute of the Italian Encyclopaedia. ISBN 978-88-12-00032-6.
- Sorce, Francesco (2022). "'Macometto in Una Nugola Nera' (Muhammad in a Black Cloud): The Imaginary War of Giovanni da San Giovanni (and Ferdinando II de' Medici) at Palazzo Pitti". In Ivana Čapeta Rakić; Giuseppe Capriotti (eds.). Images in the Borderlands. The Mediterranean between Christian and Muslim Worlds in the Early Modern Period. Turnhout: Brepols Publishers. JSTOR jj.47367711.16.
- Baldassarri, Francesca (26 September 2024). "Cecco Bravo and a 17th-century subsoil beauty". conceptualfinearts.com.
