= Saint John the Evangelist (Furini) =

Painting by Francesco Furini

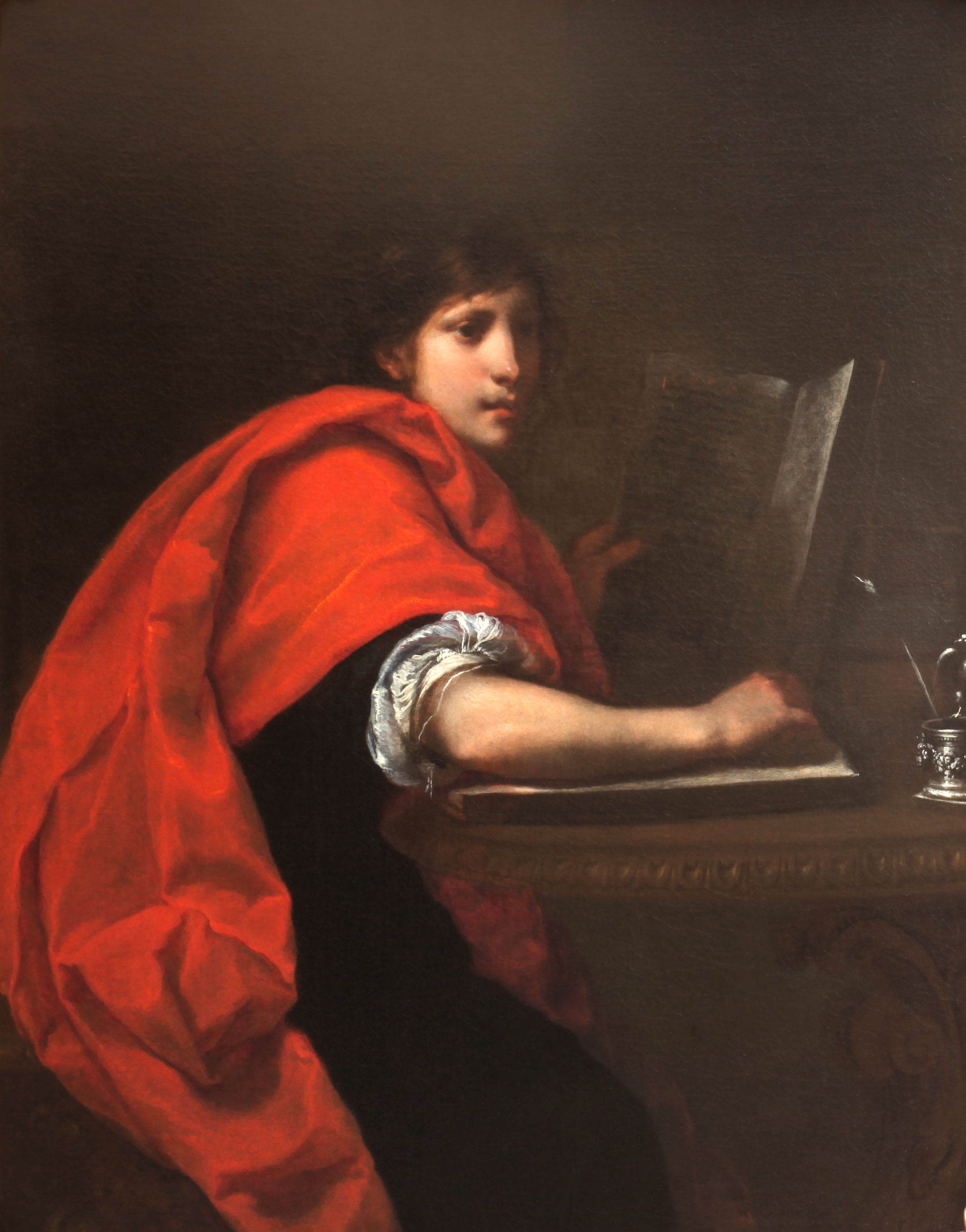
Saint John the Evangelist (1635-1636) by Francesco Furini

Saint John the Evangelist is a 1635–1636 painting by Francesco Furini, which has been in the Museum of Fine Arts of Lyon since 1987.

It was inspired by the work of Caravaggio and was commissioned by the painter's patron marquess Vitelli. The facial features show it was based on the same model as the artist's Apollo the Archer (Columbia University) and for various female allegorical figures.

== Sources ==
- "Saint Jean l'Evangéliste - Musée des Beaux Arts de Lyon". mba-lyon.fr.
