= Giovanni Maria Morandi =

Italian painter (1622–1717)

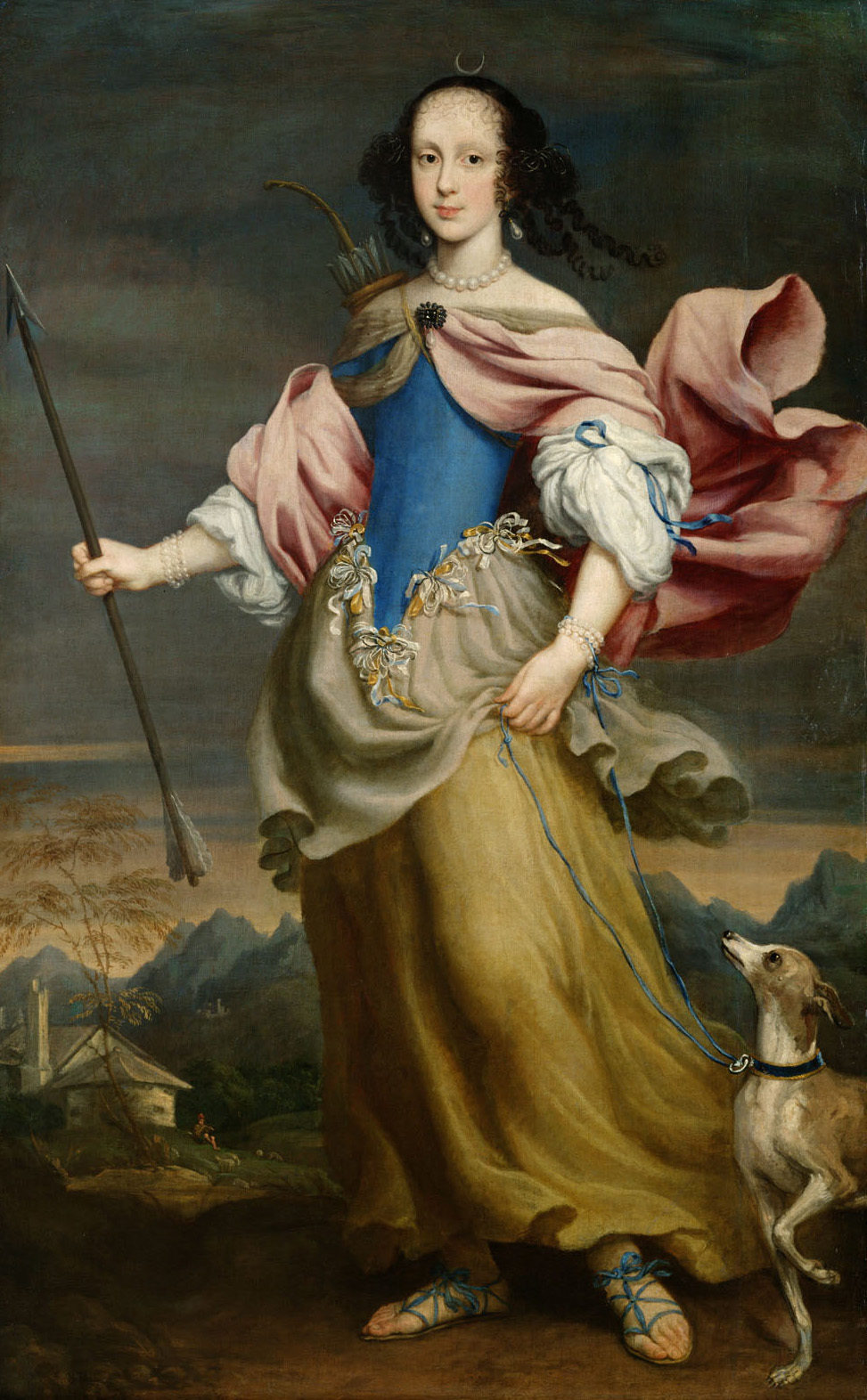
Claudia Felicitas of Austria, dressed as Diana (1666)

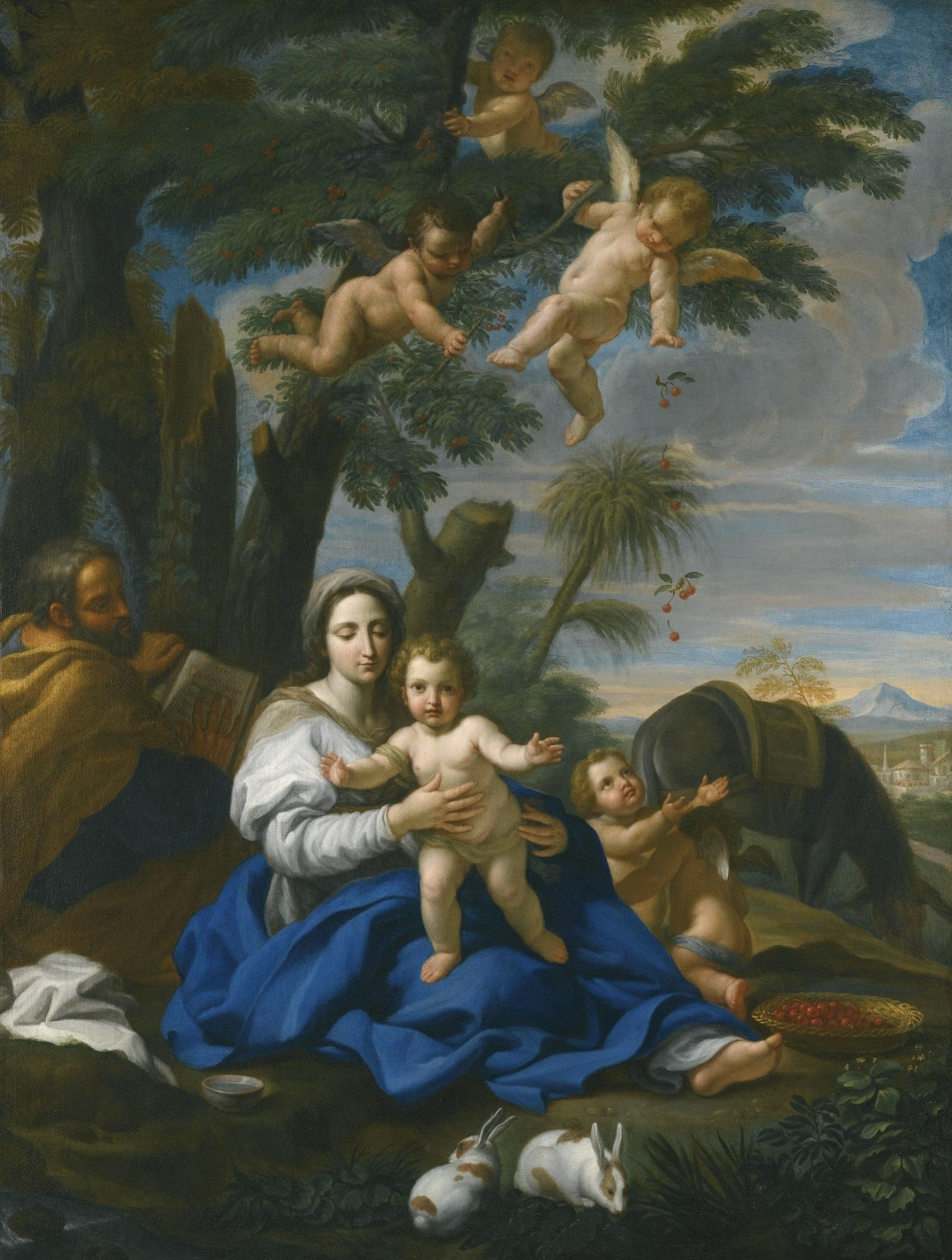
Resting on the Flight into Egypt (1680s)

Giovanni Maria Morandi (30 April 1622 – 18 February 1717) was an Italian Baroque painter, known for altarpieces and portraits.

== Biography ==
He was born in Florence. He studied art with Orazio Fidani and Giovanni Bilivert. Very few works date from this period, although a painting of Christ at the Chiesa di San Fiorenzo (demolished) is mentioned by Raffaelo Del Bruno in his guide book to Florence (1757). He probably left there sometime in the late 1640s or early 1650s.

Most of his career was spent in Rome, where he painted numerous altarpieces, including the Death of Mary in the church of Santa Maria della Pace (1664). He also worked at Santa Maria in Vallicella, where he depicted the Pentecost, Santa Maria del Popolo, where he painted a Visitation, and Santa Maria dell'Anima, where he created a Visitation and a Marriage of the Virgin. In addition, he painted murals on mythological subjects at the Palazzo Salviati in Trastevere.

He became a member of the Accademia di San Luca where, in 1671, he served as director. In 1690, he entered the newly founded Pontifical Academy of Arcadia under the name "Mantino Agoriense". For many years, he had a workshop that was very popular. His students there included Francesco Zuccarelli, Francesco Conti, Odoardo Vicinelli and Pietro Nelli.

His patrons included Emperor Leopold I and Pope Alexander VII, who provided most of his commissions, in Rome and Siena, where he was the official portraitist for the Pope's family, the Chigis. Also in Siena, he painted an Annunciation for the church at Santa Maria della Scala, and a Saint Filippo Neri in Ecstasy at Siena Cathedral.

Morandi died in Rome on 18 February 1717.
