= Palazzo Galli Tassi =

Palazzo Galli Tassi may refer to:

- Palazzo Galli Tassi, Florence
- Palazzo Galli Tassi, Lucca
