= Palazzo Galli Tassi, Florence =

Building in Florence, Italy

Palazzo Galli Tassi
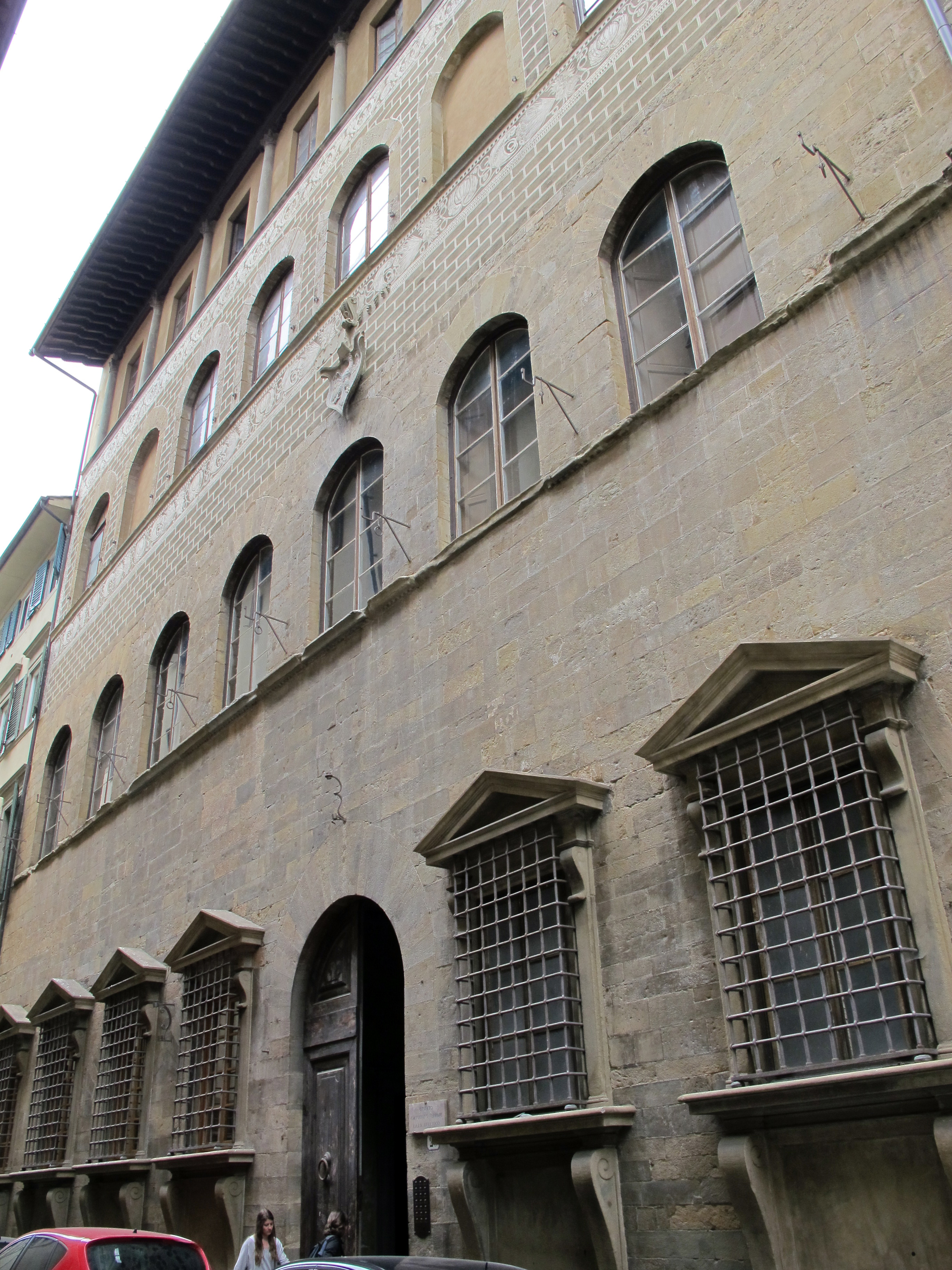
- Interactive map of the Palazzo Galli Tassi area

General information
- Location: Florence, Tuscany, Italy
- Coordinates: 43°46′15.57″N 11°15′34.56″E

The Palazzo Galli Tassi is a historic building in Florence, Italy, located between Via dei Pandolfini and Borgo degli Albizi.

== History ==
It was built in the early 16th century, incorporating a group of pre-existing medieval merchant houses. Traditionally associated with Baccio Valori, the palace later became the property of the Galli Tassi family in 1623, who initiated major renovations, including works by Gherardo Silvani (1645) and Gaspare Maria Paoletti (1762). During the period of Florence as the capital of Italy (1865–1871), it housed the Ministry of Agriculture and was later used for public offices and private ownership.

== Description ==
The interior features significant decorative cycles by major 17th-century Florentine artists, including Giovanni da San Giovanni, Fabrizio Boschi, Ottavio Vannini, Cosimo Ulivelli, Luigi Baccio del Bianco, Francesco Furini, and Matteo Rosselli. A notable marble group of Hercules and Jole by Domenico Pieratti stands in the central courtyard. The façade is adorned with 16th-century sgraffito decorations, allegorical motifs, and historical coats of arms, including that of the Valori family.

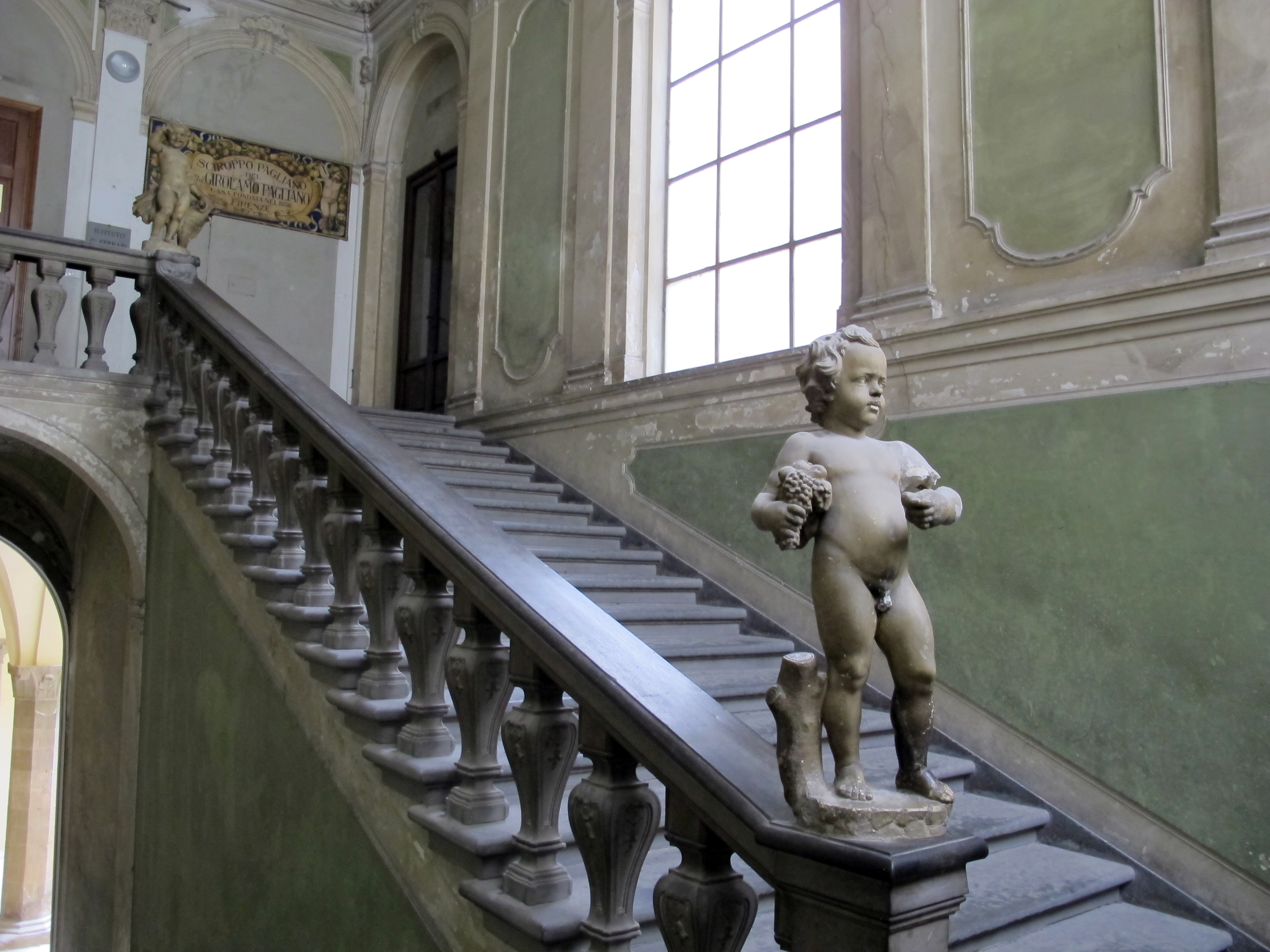
The staircase

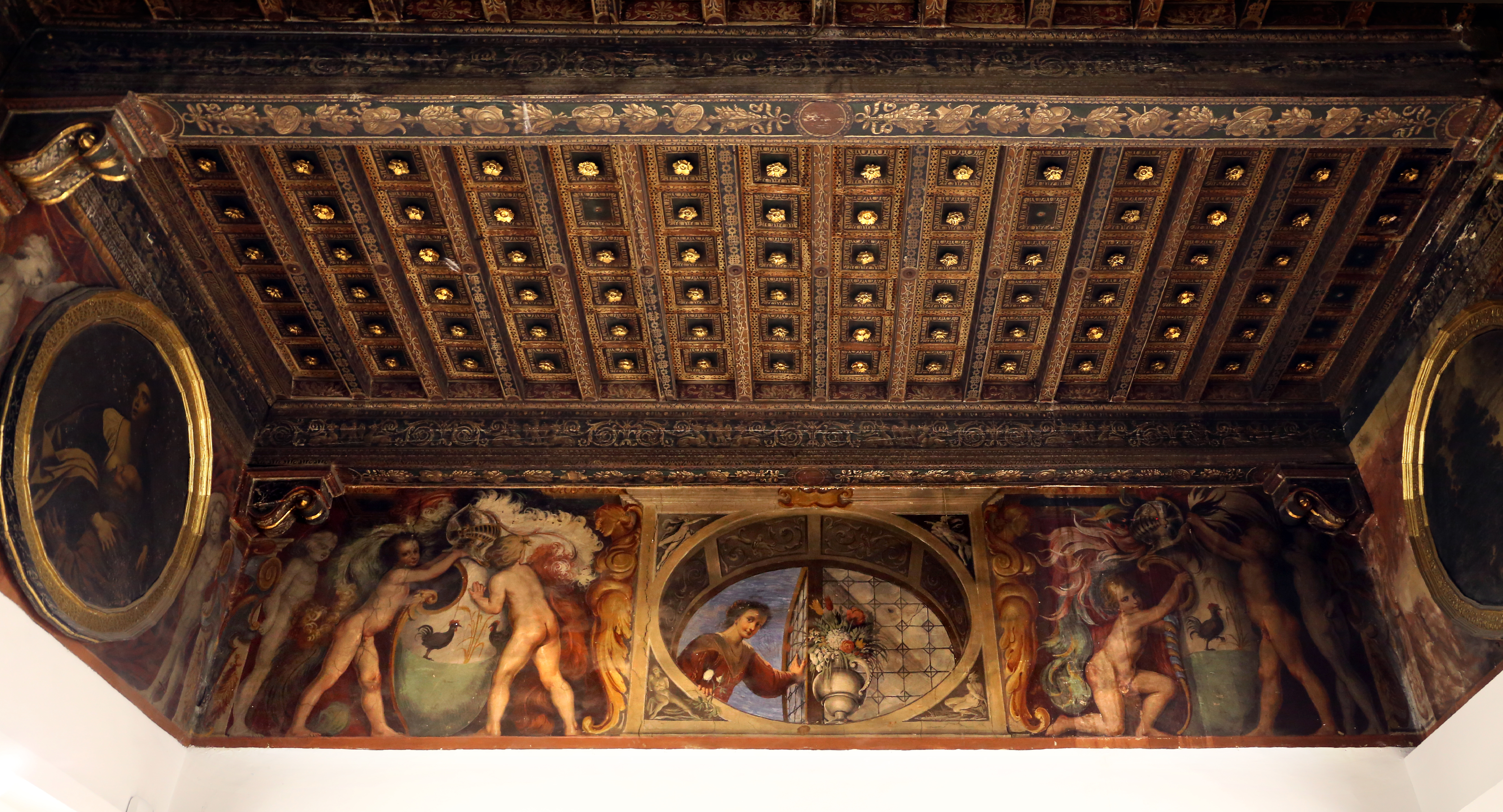
Pastor fido decorations by Baccio del Bianco

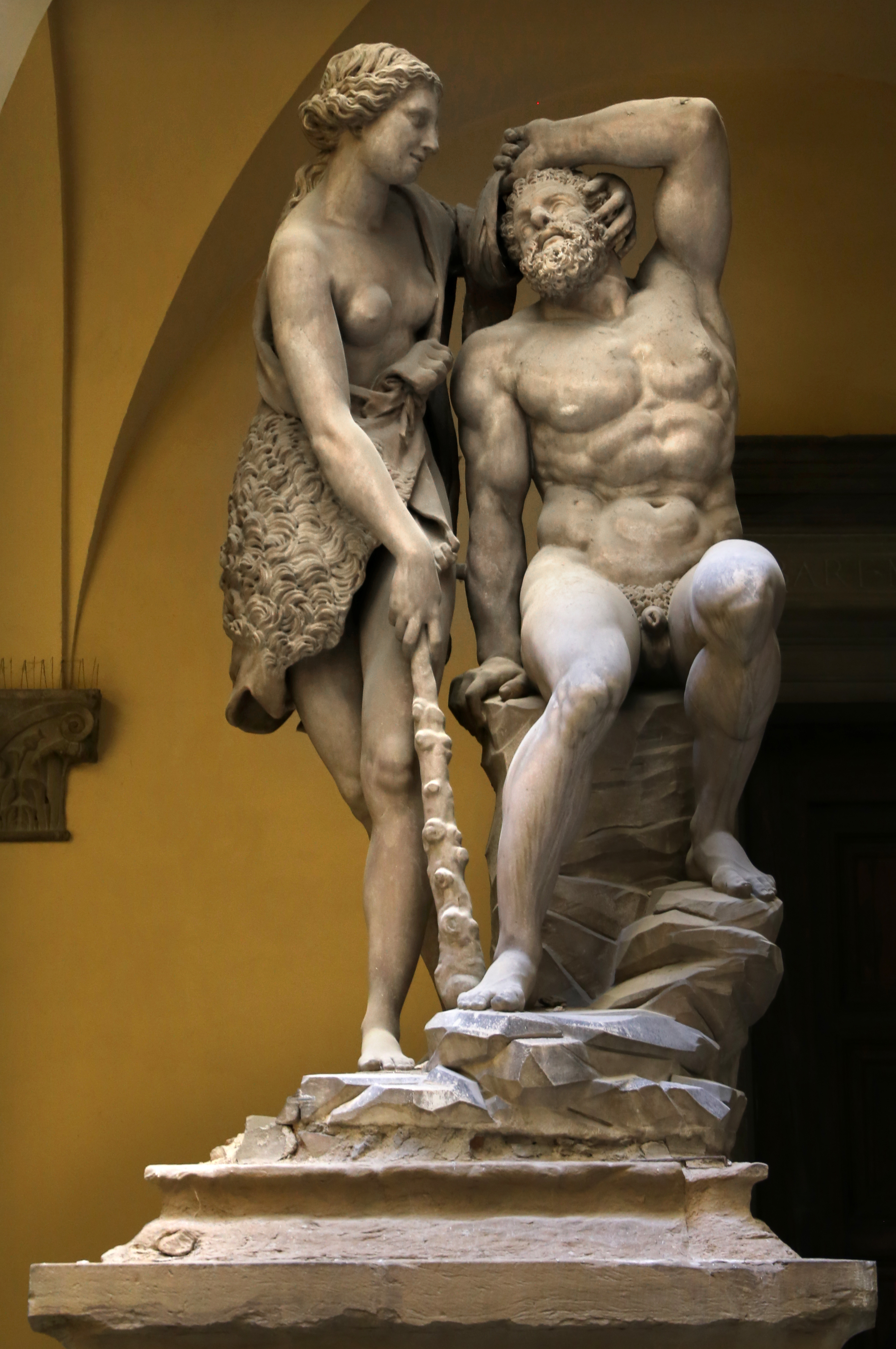
Hercules and Jole by Domenico Pieratti

== Sources ==
- Firenze e provincia. Milan: Touring Club Italiano. 2005. p. 393.
- Mario Bevilacqua; Giuseppina Carla Romby, eds. (2007). Atlante del Barocco in Italia. Toscana 1. Firenze e il Granducato. Province di Grosseto, Livorno, Pisa, Pistoia, Prato, Siena. Rome: De Luca Editori d'Arte. p. 414.
- Paolini, Claudio (2008). Case e palazzi nel quartiere di Santa Croce a Firenze. Florence: Paideia. pp. 147–148.
- Pecchioli, Eleonora (2005). 'Florentia Picta'. Le facciate dipinte e graffite dal XV al XX secolo. Florence: Centro Di. pp. 204–207.
