= Oratorio dei Vanchetoni =

Church building in Florence, Italy

Coordinates: 43°46′23.76″N 11°14′49.89″E

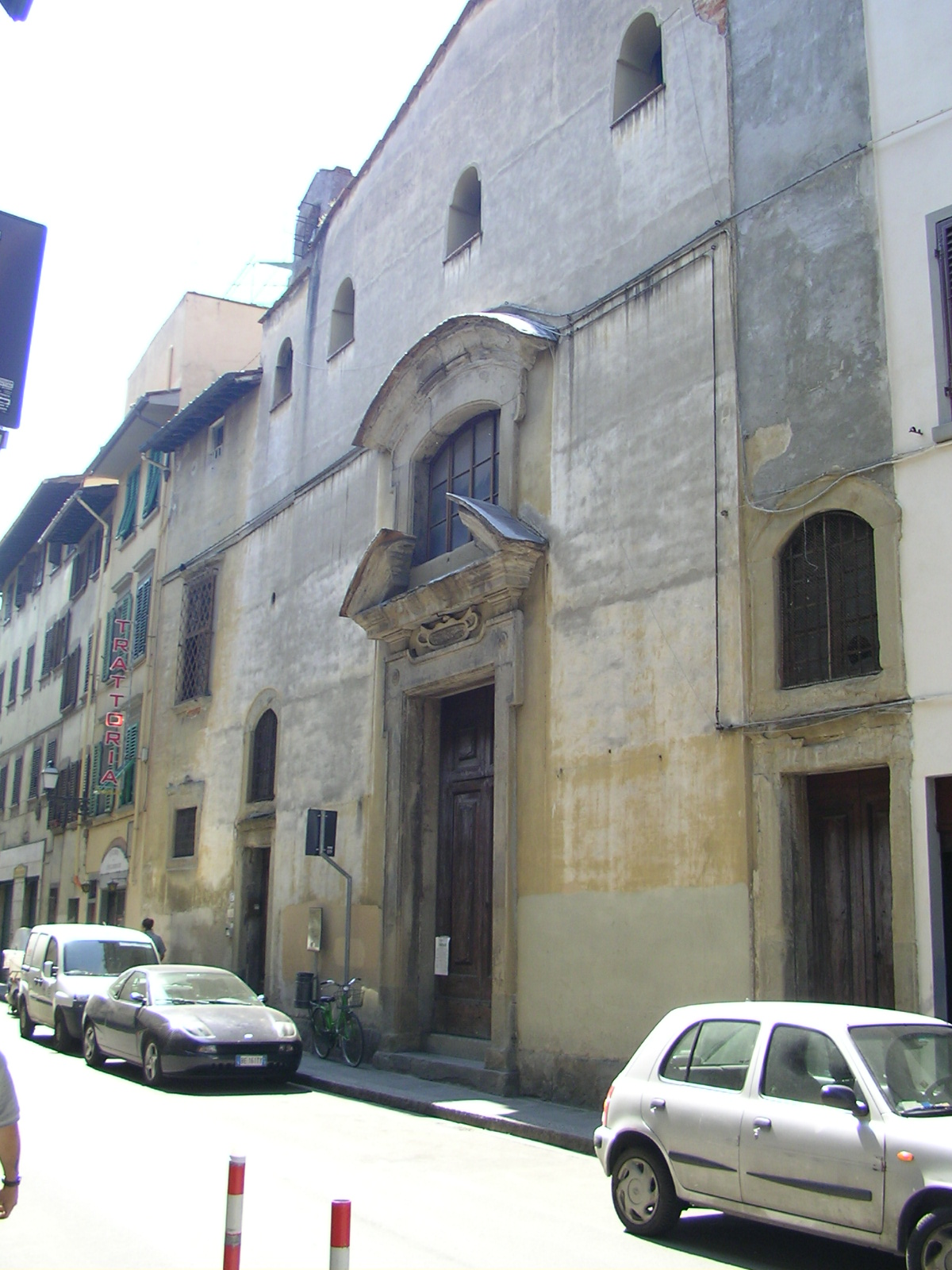
The Oratory of the Vanchetoni

The Oratorio dei Vanchetoni or Oratory of the Vanchetoni is a Roman Catholic prayer hall for the Arch-confraternity of San Francesco, in Florence, region of Tuscany, Italy.

== History ==
The society was founded by Ippolito Galantini (1565-1619), and had the purpose of educating poor children on the Christian doctrine. The members of the company were called vanchetoni, for their habit of walking quietly, and bacchettoni, in reference to the used baton for penitential self-scourging.

The confraternity building was designed by Matteo and Giovanni Nigetti in 1602–1604, and built in land once the orchard of the Church of Ognissanti. The long hall where the confratelli gathered, was frescoed between 1633 and 1649 by quadri riportati of saints by Giovanni Martinelli, Domenico Pugliani, Baldassare Franceschini il Volterrano, Cecco Bravo and Lorenzo Lippi. Galantini was posthumously made venerable in 1765, and beatified in 1825.

Today, the oratory is used for chamber concerts and small meetings.
