= Madonna dei Galletti, Pisa =

Church building in Pisa, Italy

Coordinates: 43°43′0.20″N 10°23′57.67″E

Church della Madonna dei Galletti
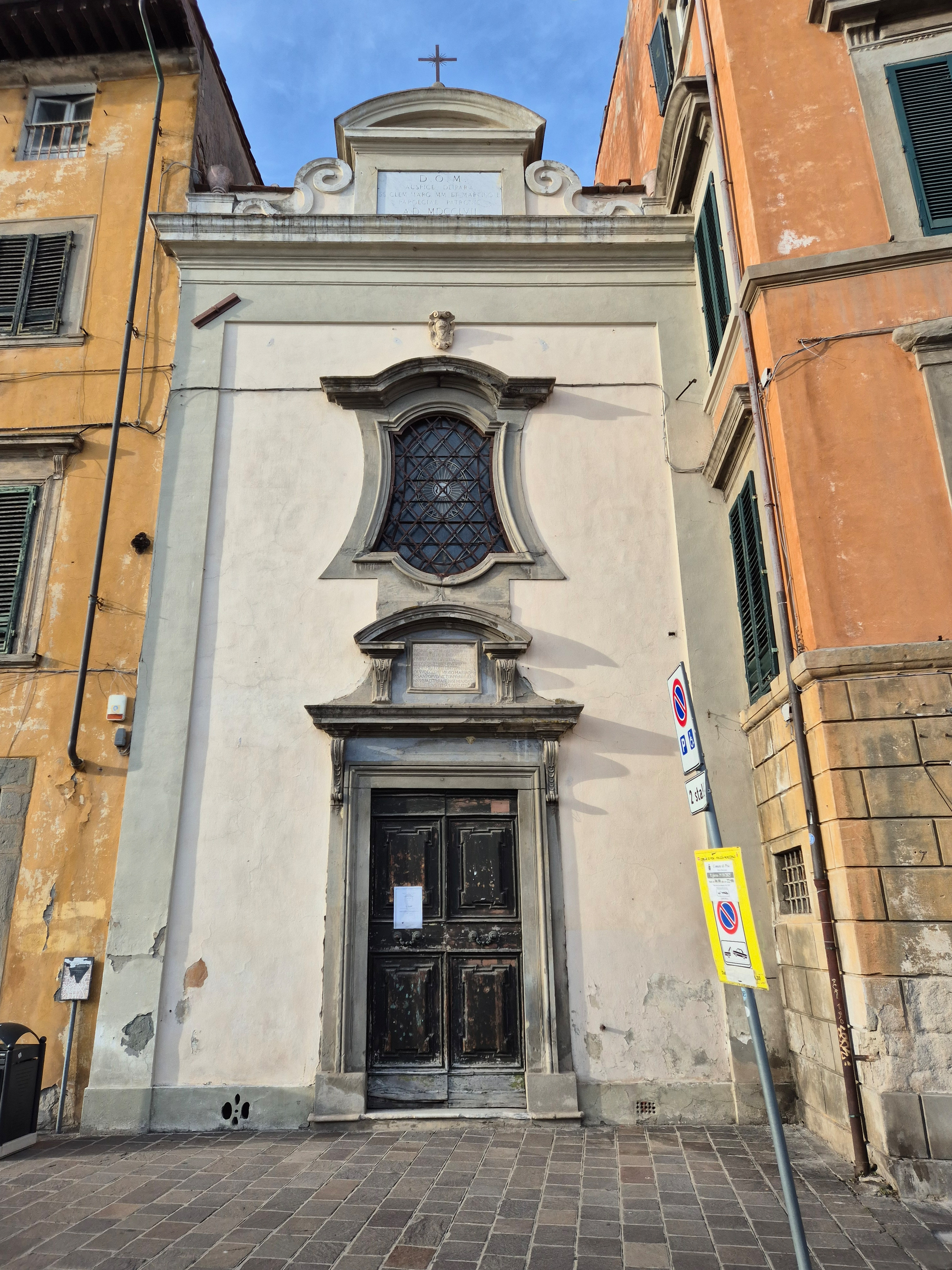
- Facade

Religion
- Affiliation: Roman Catholic
- Province: Pisa

Location
- Location: Pisa, Italy
- Interactive map of Church della Madonna dei Galletti

Architecture
- Type: Church
- Style: Baroque
- Groundbreaking: 13th Century
- Completed: 1757

The Madonna dei Galletti is a Baroque-style, Roman Catholic church in Pisa, region of Tuscany, Italy.

== History ==
Documents from 1227 mention a church at the site called San Salvatore in Porta Aurea; the latter is one of the gates of the walls of medieval Pisa. The church underwent reconstruction in the 16th century. The façade was added in 1757 on designs of Ignazio Pellegrini. The gilded wooden ceiling from 1642 has been attributed to Del Norcia, and the canvases therein to Jacopo Vignali, Cecco Bravo, Lorenzo Lippi, and Francesco Curradi. The church owes its name to a frescoed image of Madonna and Child attributed to Taddeo di Bartolo, which was discovered in a biscuit box in 1640, and which is now found on main altar.
