= San Giovanni Battista, Pistoia =

Church building in Pistoia, Italy

Coordinates: 43°55′51″N 10°54′45″E

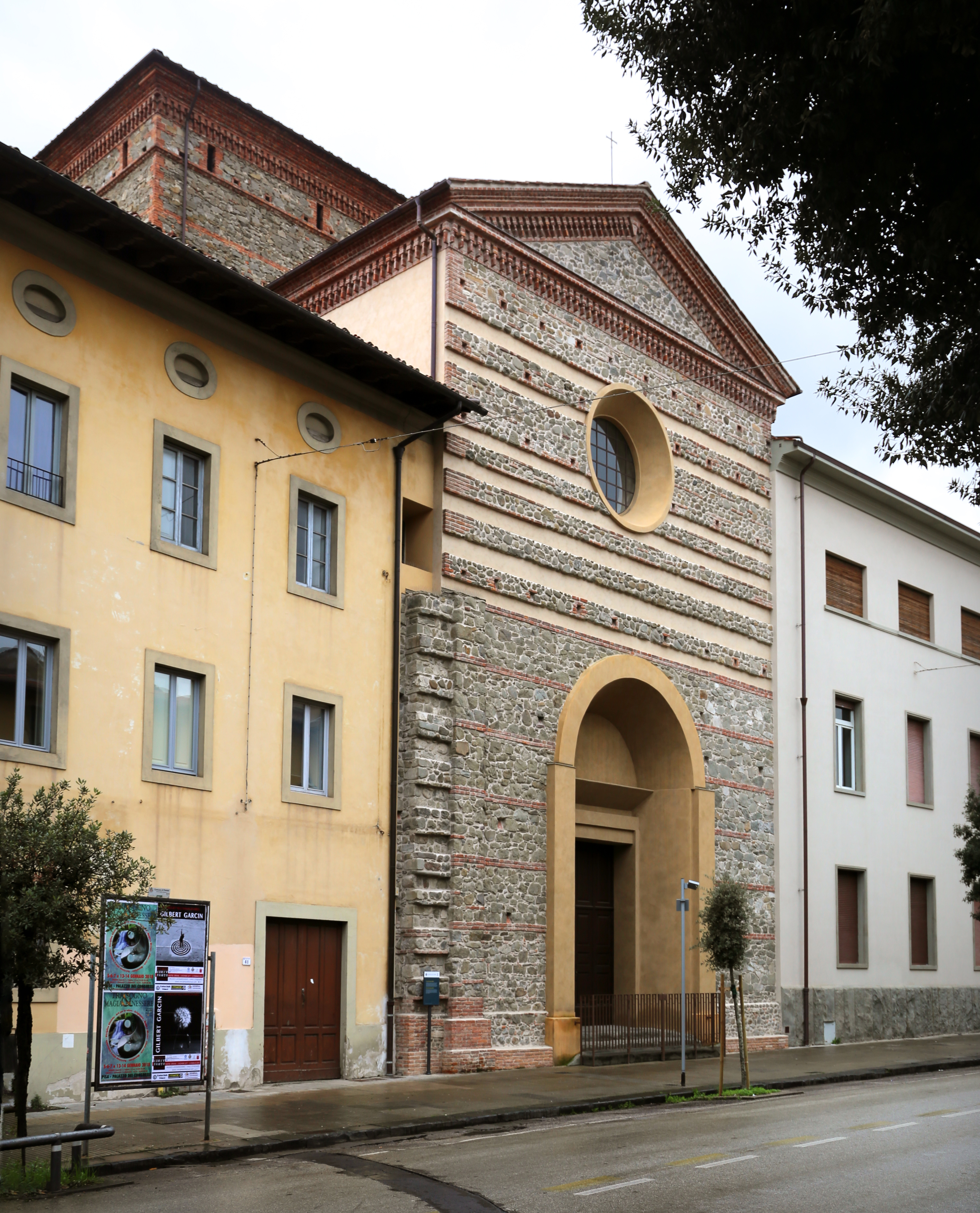
Adoration of the Shepherds by Sebastiano Vini

San Giovanni Battista is a deconsecrated Roman Catholic church located on Corso Gramsci in Pistoia, region of Tuscany, Italy. The present building is a reconstruction of the former Renaissance-style church which was severely damaged during World-War II, and is now used for exhibitions.

== History and description ==
In 1312, Gherardino di Giovanni Ammannati donated his palace and garden to the Franciscan order, so they could build a monastery. The church was designed circa 1494 by Ventura Vitoni; the dome was not completed until 1513. In 1783, it was also attached to the Monastery of Santa Lucia. By the 19th century, the monastery had become a "Conservatorio" or boarding school dedicated to educating girls di civil condizione. The education was free, and the girls were trained in skill.

None of the artwork noted in an inventory of 1821 is presently in the church, including:

- Nativity of Christ by Beccafumi and another by Bastiano Veronese
- An Enthroned Madonna by Fra Paolino
- A Baptism of Christ by Francesco Desideri
- A Baptism of the Jews in the River Jordan by Livio Mehus
- A Sermon in the Mount also by Mehus
- Child in the Desert by Desideri
- Birth of Christ by Francesco Leoncini
- Visitation by Agostino Melissi
- Zaccarias offers incense by Leoncini
- Jesus in Limbo attributed to Leoncini
- Decollation of John th Baptist by Melissi
- Herod's dance by Melissi.
- St John in jail by Giacinto Gimignani
- St Francis above the grate attributed to il Scalabrino (Giovanni Battista di Pietro di Stefano Volponi?)
