= Orazio Fidani =

Italian painter

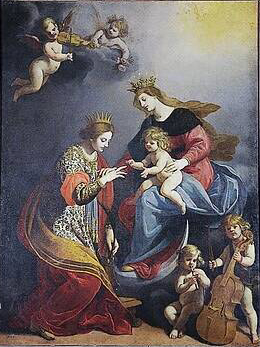
Baptism of Christ, 1635

Orazio Fidani (10 July 1610, Florence – 2 January 1656, Florence) was an Italian painter; primarily of religious and mythological subjects.

He practiced a style of Naturalism associated with Florence. The works of Caravaggio were an obvious influence. His primary teacher was Giovanni Bilivert, whose studio he was employed in for twelve years. He later wrote Bilivert's biography. Francesco Furini was a friend and frequent collaborator. He also worked with Vincenzo Mannozzi and Felice Ficherelli.

He painted at numerous churches throughout the Tuscan countryside. Some of his altarpieces are reproductions of Bilivert's. Toward the end of his short life, he went to live at the Florence Charterhouse, where he completed frescoes and works on canvas.
