= Agostino Melissi =

Italian painter (1615–1683)

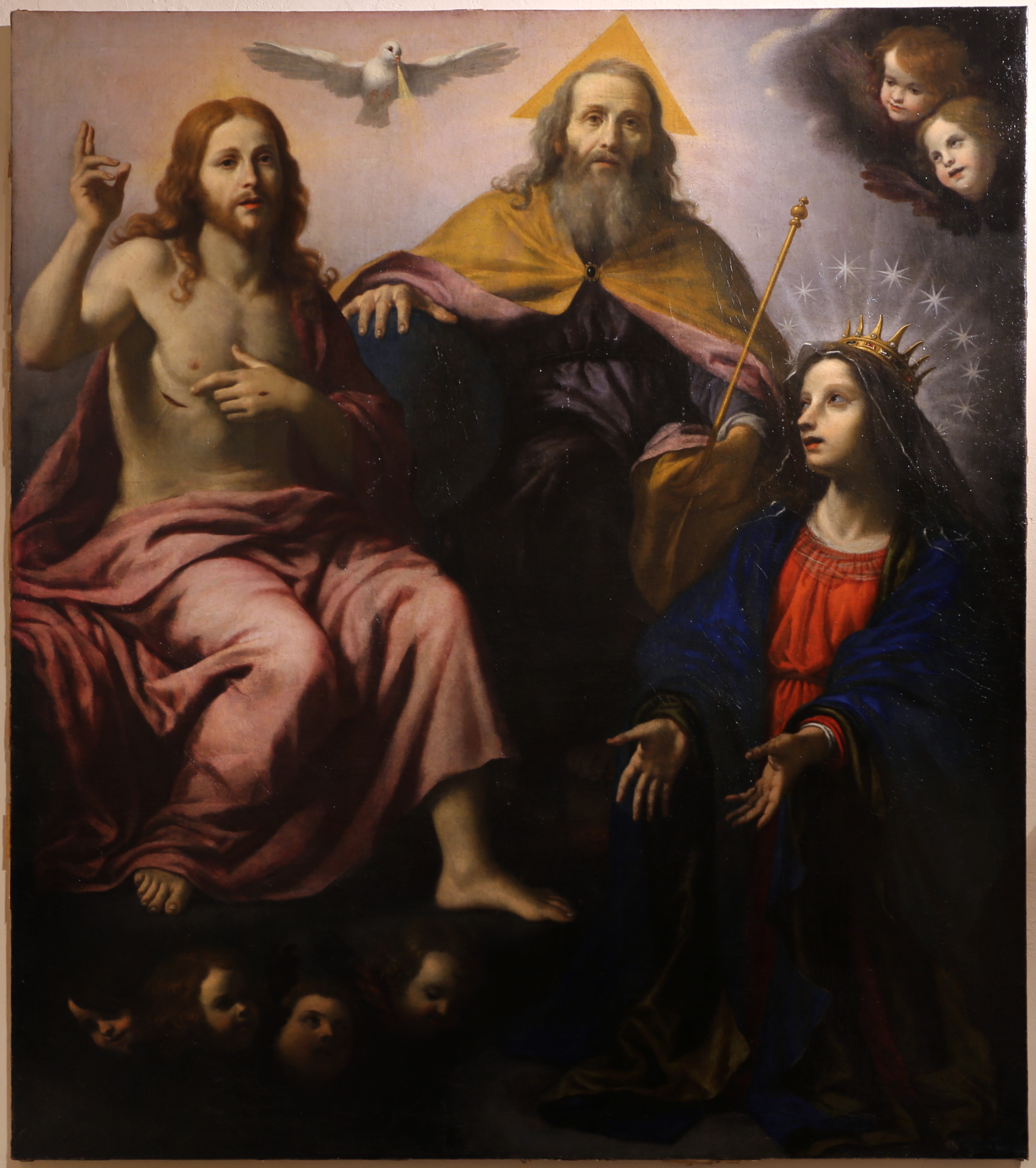
The Virgin Intercedes with the Trinity

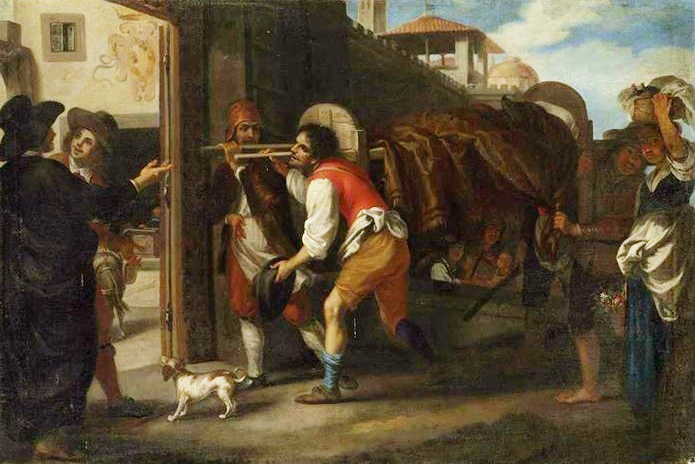
Piovano Arlotto Smuggling a Wild Boar into Florence

Agostino Melissi (c.1616 – 1683) was an Italian painter of the Baroque period; active mainly in Florence.

== Biography ==
He was born in Florence. He began as a pupil of Matteo Rosselli then, from 1634, served an apprenticeship in the studios of Giovanni Bilivert. Many of his early works would be attributed to his teacher. One of the first to be identified as his was a "Pietà", now lost, created for the Medicis in 1638. His first signed work is from 1640: an altarpiece depicting Saint Catherine of Alexandria, at the Basilica of the Santissima Annunziata. Contemporary records also mention four works from the 1640s at the church of San Giovanni Battista, Pistoia, which was destroyed during World War II.

His work for the Arazzeria Medicea (tapestry factory) through 1674 is well-documented. There, he made drawings (known as cartoons) of works by Andrea del Sarto and many others for use in the weaving process. He also made cartoons, after Del Sarto and Franciabigio, for frescoes at the Chiostro dello Scalzo.

In 1645. he made his first application for membership in the Accademia delle Arti del Disegno. Five years later, he began a series of paintings dealing with the life of Alexander the Great. In 1666 he designed a tapestry depicting Cosimo de' Medici upon his triumphant entry into Siena. His last signed and dated work is a depiction of the Virgin interceding with the Trinity, for the church of San Pietro al Terreno. He worked on it from 1657 to 1674 and left it unfinished.

He died in Florence sometime in late 1683, and was interred at the Monastero delle Murate.
