= Jacques Bylivelt =

Dutch goldsmith (1550–1603)

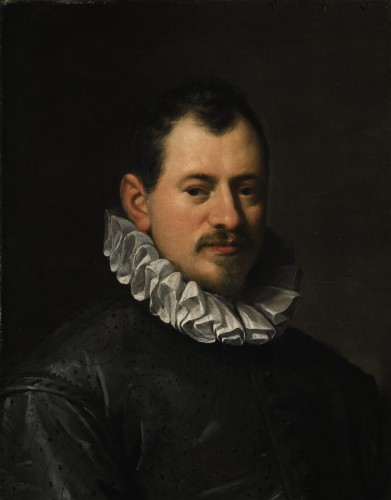
Jacques Bylivelt; portrait by Hans von Aachen (1585)

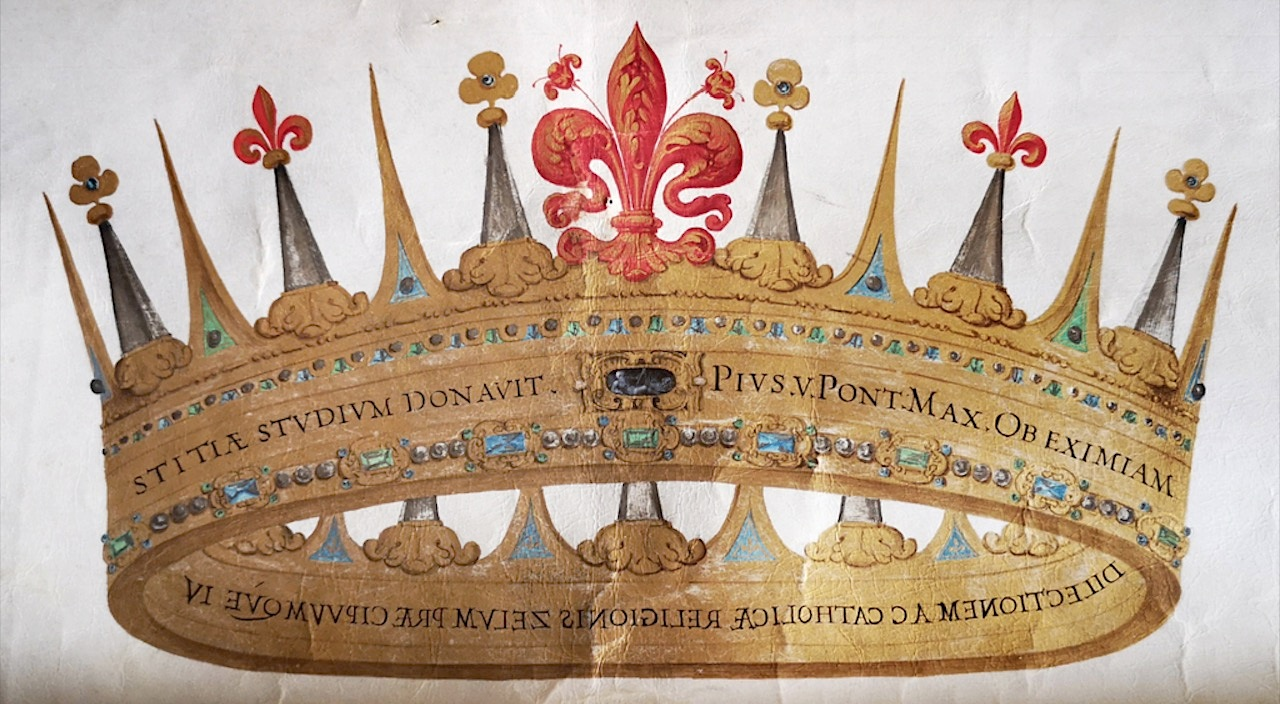
The design for the Grand Ducal Crown, as depicted in a papal bull

Jacques Bylivelt, also known as Giacomo Giovanni Bilivert or Jacopo Biliverti (17 November 1550 – 19 February 1603) was a Dutch goldsmith and jeweler who worked for the Medicis.

== Biography ==
He was born in Delft. His original name was Jacob Janszoon Bijlevelt. He learned the basics of the goldsmithing trade in Augsburg.

He left the Netherlands in 1573 to take a position at the court of Francesco de' Medici in Florence. In 1575, after King Philip II recognized Francesco as the second Grand Duke of Tuscany, he ordered a new Grand Ducal Crown and some crown jewels. Bylivelt worked on both projects. The crown was lost during the Napoleonic era. He also became head of the gemstone workshop, where he created items for several members of the Medici family.

In 1576, thanks to his increased income, he was able to marry Fiametta Mazzafiri, who was related to the goldsmith Michele Mazzafiri (1530–1597) of the Medici workshops. It was then that he adopted an Italian name. Their son, Giovanni Biliverti, became a painter.

After 1587, he participated in organizing the art collection of the new Grand Duke, Ferdinand I, who also entrusted him with conducting visiting diplomats and dignitaries on tours of Florence's art treasures. In addition, he was responsible for making some of the friendship gifts given to French King Henri IV.

His chinoiserie porcelain and jewelry were also ordered by the Roman Emperor Rudolf II and his courtiers, so several examples have been preserved in the collection of the Kunsthistorisches Museum in Vienna.

He died in his Florence workshop in 1603, at the age of fifty-two.
