= Giovanni Biliverti =

Italian painter

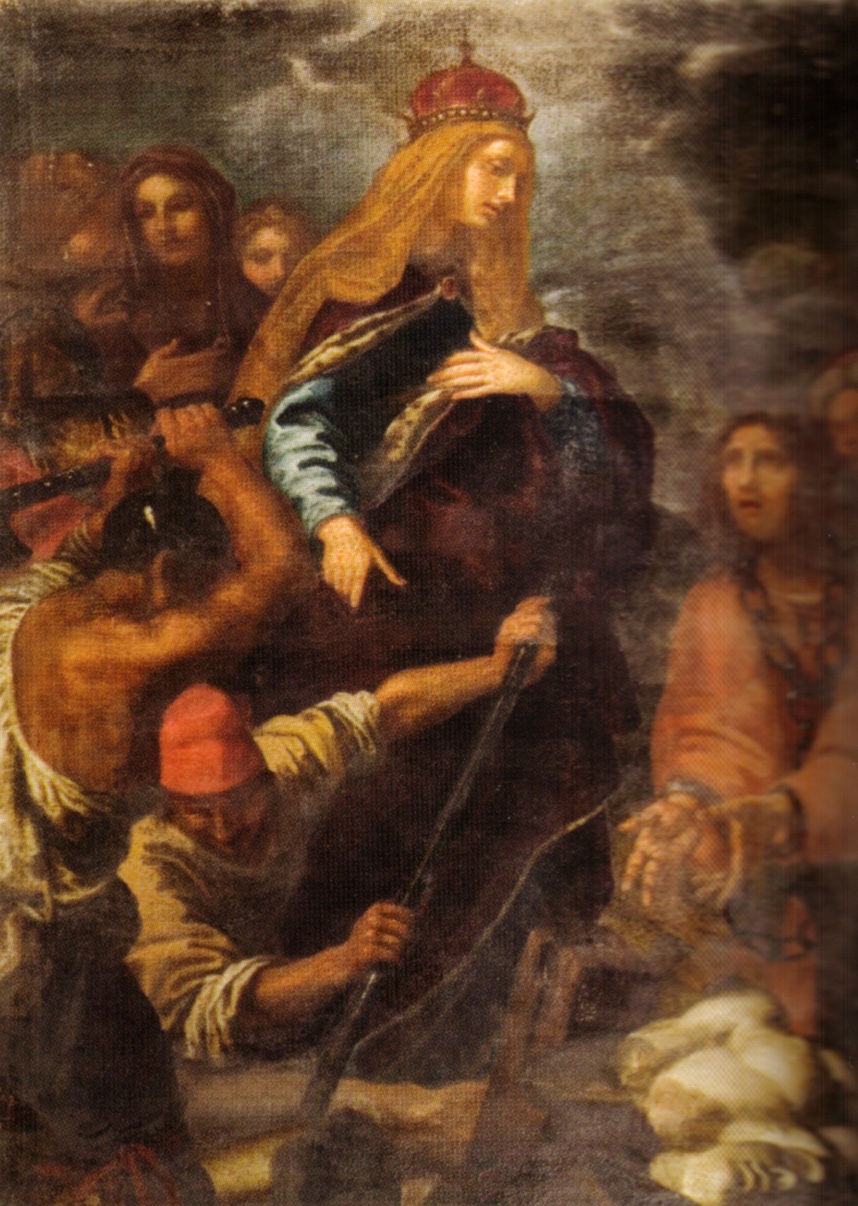
Saint Helena finding the Holy Cross

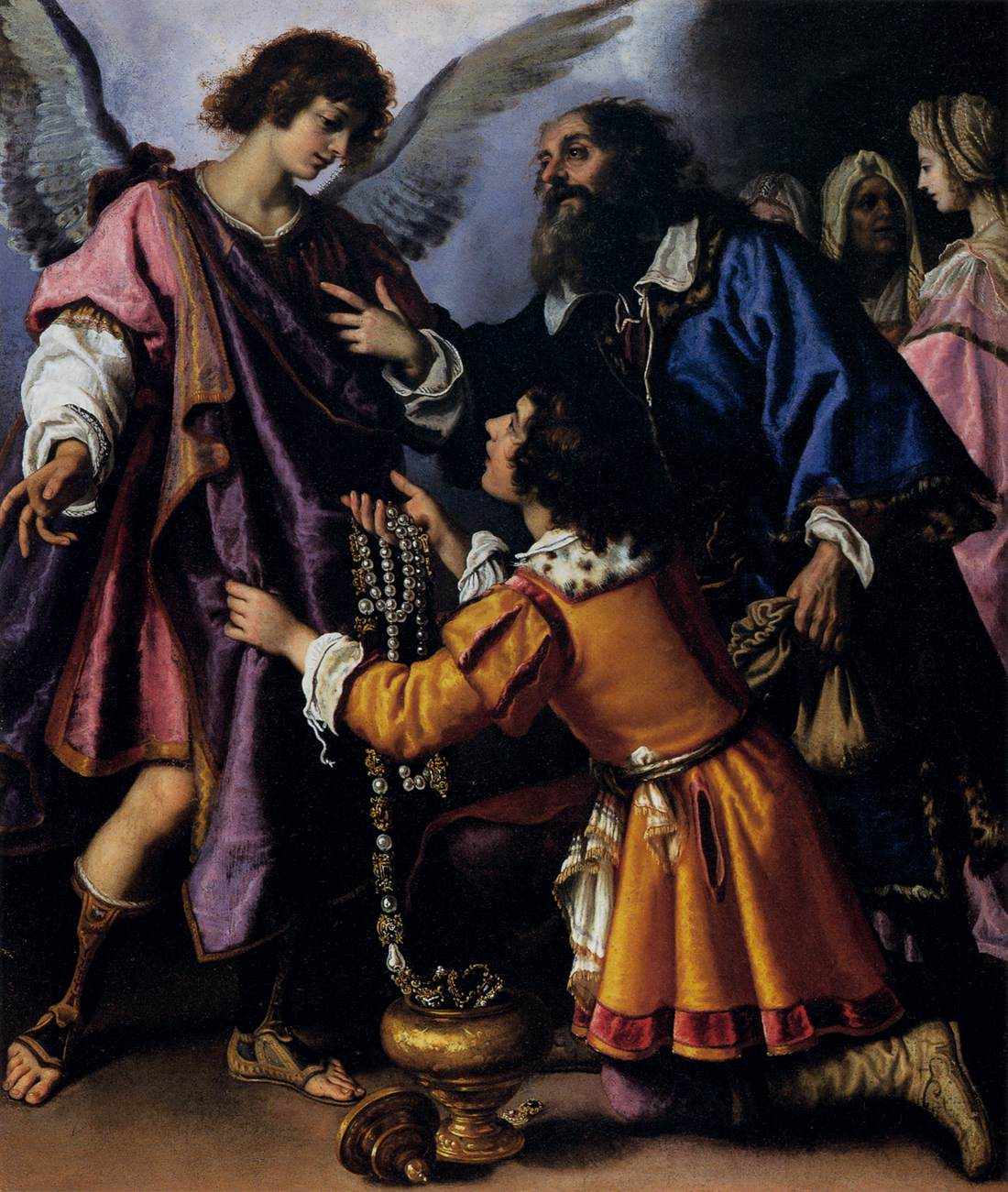
The Archangel Raphael Refusing Tobias's Gift

Giovanni Biliverti (surname also written as Bilivelt and Bilivert or other variants; 25 August 1585 – 16 July 1644) was an Italian painter of the late-Mannerism and early-Baroque period, active mainly in his adoptive city of Florence, as well as Rome.

== Life and work ==
He was born in Maastricht. His father, Jacques Bylivelt (born Jacob Janszoon Bijlevelt; also known as Giacomo Giovanni Biliverti), was a painter and goldsmith from Delft, who went to Florence, where he worked for Ferdinando I de' Medici.

Biliverti began as an apprentice in the workshops of Alessandro Casolani, in Siena. After his father's death in 1603, he worked in the studios of Lodovico Cardi (known as "Cigoli"), in Rome, from 1604 until 1607. During that time, they worked on commissions from Pope Clement VIII. In 1609, he joined the Accademia delle Arti del Disegno, which was sponsored by the Medicis.

In 1611, he created his first independent work, a martyrdom of Saint Callistus for the Benedictines. He was employed by Cosimo II de' Medici from 1611 until 1621, as a designer for the inlay technique known as "pietra dura".

His Grateful Tobias and Chastity of Joseph (c. 1618) may be found in the Palatine Gallery of the Palazzo Pitti. In 1621, he painted a portrayal of Saint Helena discovering the Holy Cross, for the Basilica of Santa Croce. His Hagar in the Desert is displayed in the Hermitage Museum. His Christ and the Samaritan Woman is at the Belvedere.

Late in life, he became blind. He died in Florence in 1644. His students included Cecco Bravo, Agostino Melissi, Baccio del Bianco, Giovanni Maria Morandi and Orazio Fidani.
