= Simone Pignoni =

Italian painter

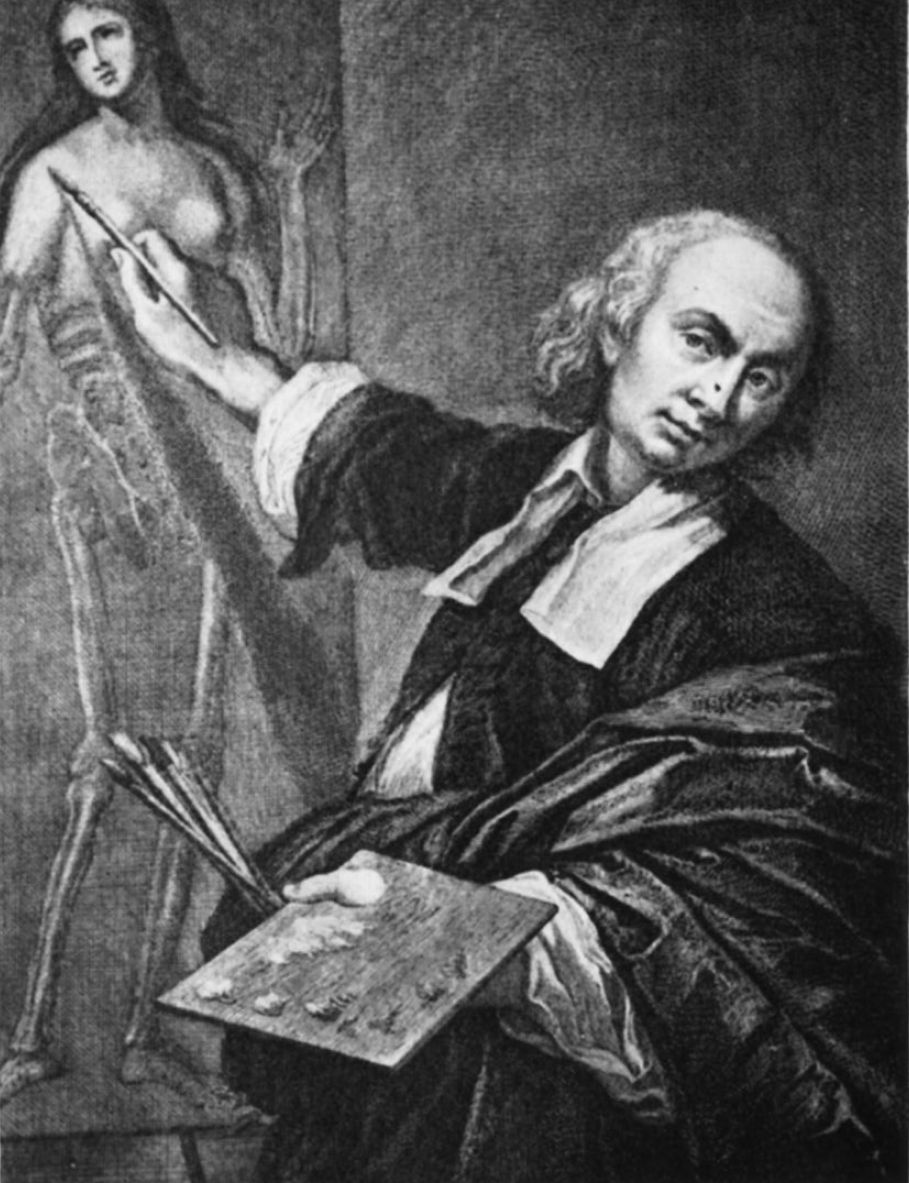
Self-portrait; engraved by Georg Prenner (1720-1766)

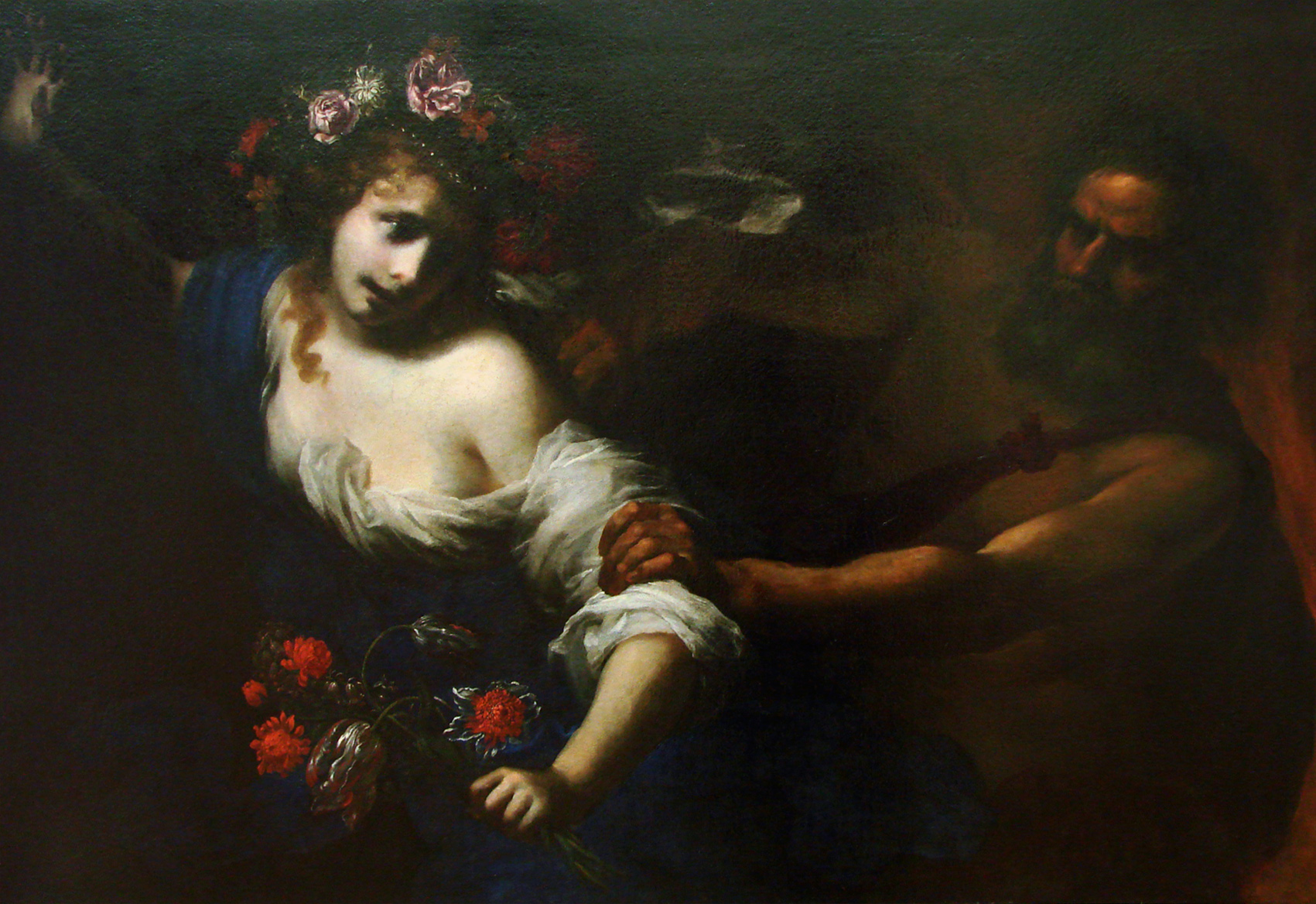
Simone Pignoni, The Rape of Proserpine, "School of Nancy" Museum of the Arts, Nancy, 1650

Simone Pignoni (April 17, 1611 – December 16, 1698) was an Italian painter of the Baroque period.

== Biography ==
He apprenticed with Fabrizio Boschi, then with the more academic and puritanical Domenico Passignano, and finally with Francesco Furini. He is best known for painting in a style reminiscent of the morbidly sensual Furini. Reflective of this obsession is his self-portrait, c. 1650, in which he depicts himself building up a plump naked female from a skeleton. The biographer Baldinucci, in what little he notes of the painter, recalls him as the scandalous "imitator of (Furini's) licentious inventions".

A more complete biography was recorded by his pupil Giovanni Camillo Sagrestani. Described as endowed with a "bizarre and amenable intelligence", Pignoni apparently had a late-life conversion to more pious painting. There is one episode recalled that during a serious illness "because in his life he had focused on studying about female forms, and (now) having resigned himself to the impending infinity, his spiritual father urged him to purge those errors with the flame, and once guided by a good disposition, he suddenly was cured by the Lord." Baldinucci's biography of Furini also recorded a similar, near-death renunciation of his art of the naked figure.

Among his more conventional works are a St. Agatha cured by St. Peter (attributed) in the Museo Civico di Trieste; a St. Louis providing a banquet for the poor (c. 1682) now in the church of Santa Felicita in Florence, commissioned by Count Luigi Guicciardini; and a Madonna and child in glory with archangels Saints Michael and Raphael in battle armor and San Antonio of Padua (1671) for the Cappella di San Michele in Santissima Annunziata. He painted an Allegory of Peace in Palazzo Vecchio. A Penitent Magdalen that has been attributed to Pignoni is found in the Pitti Palace. In San Bartolomeo in Monteoliveto, he painted a Madonna appearing to Blessed Bernardo Tolomeo.

In addition to Sagrestani, another pupil was the priest Luca Querci of Cutigliano.
