= Cosimo Ulivelli =

Italian painter

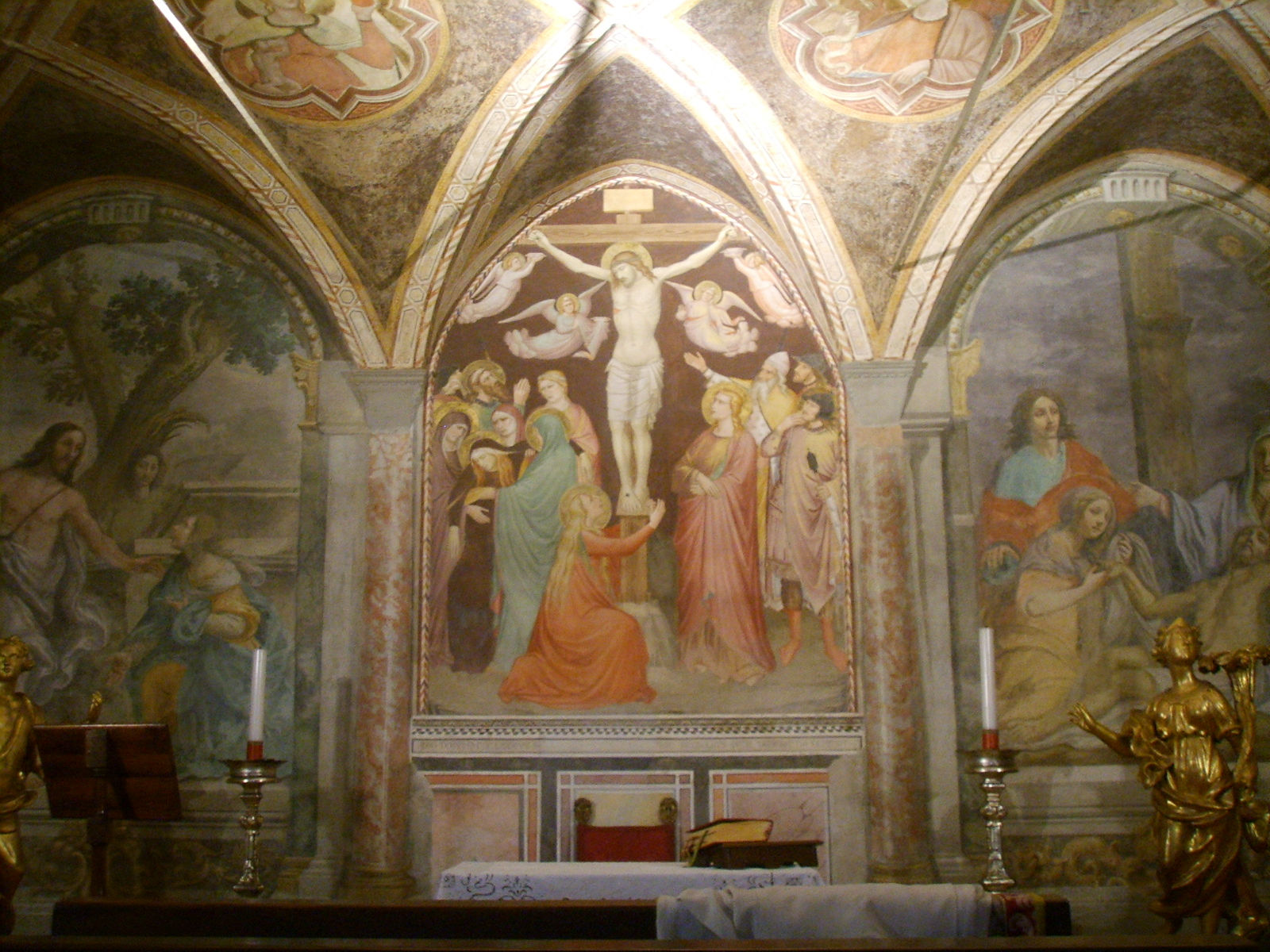
frescoes by Cosimo Ulivelli and Niccolò di Pietro Gerini, church of Santa Felicita, Florence

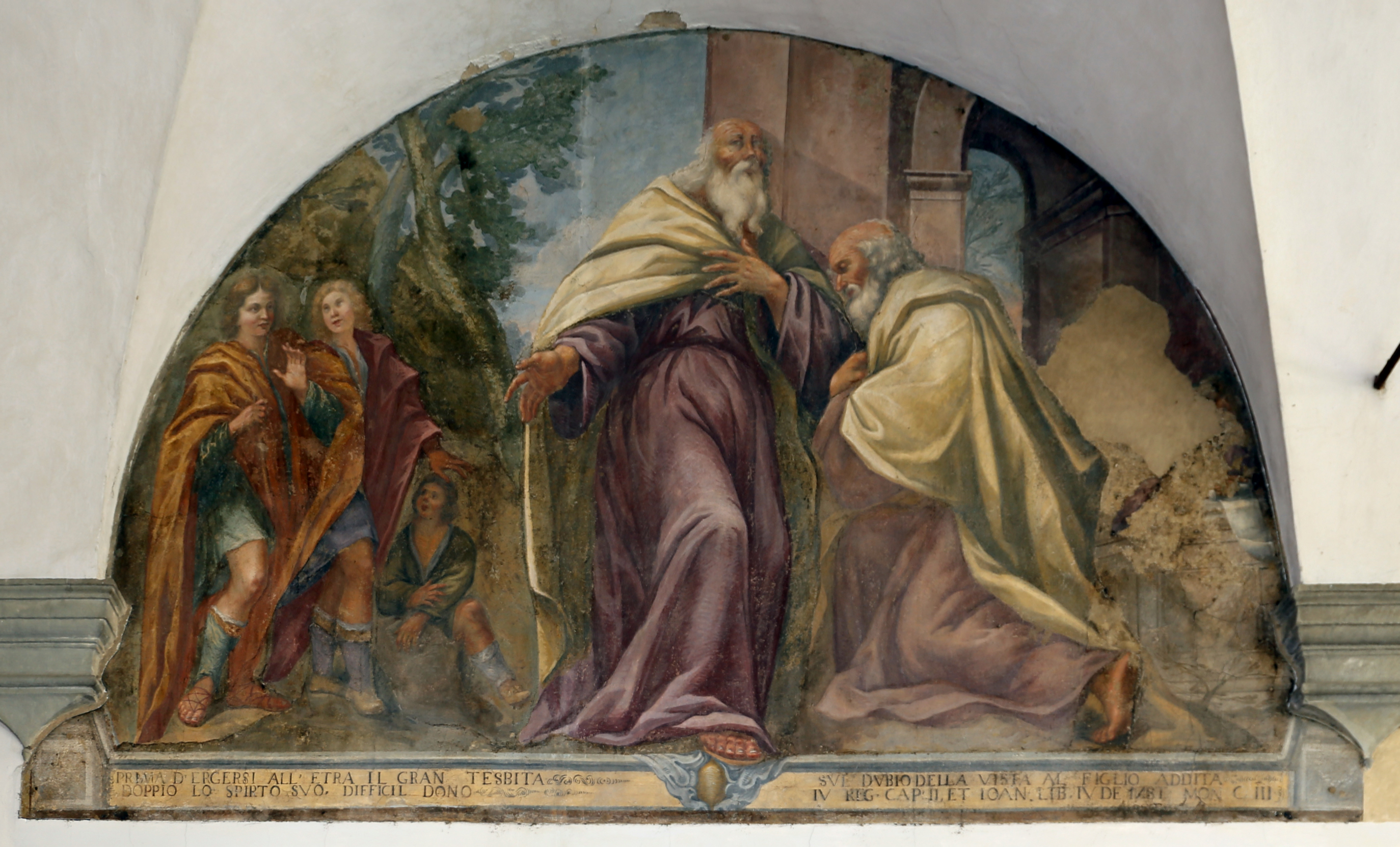
Elijah's Farewell to Elisha, 1682, cloister of Santa Maria del Carmine, Florence

Cosimo Ulivelli (1625–1705) was an Italian painter of the Baroque period, active mainly in Florence. He was a pupil of the painter Baldassare Franceschini. He painted frescoes along the top of the wall of the nave of the church the Santissima Annunziata in Florence.
