= Francesco Furini =

Italian painter (c. 1600/3–1646)

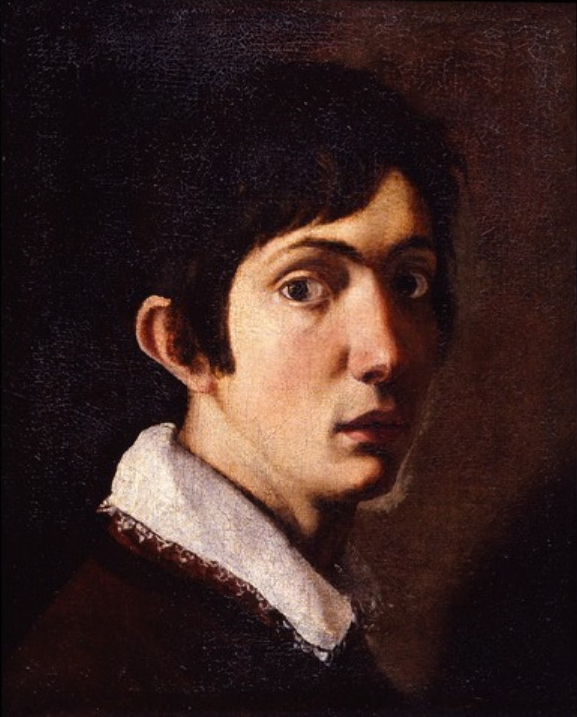
- Self-portrait, Florence, Uffizi
- Born: 10 April 1603; Florence, Grand Duchy of Tuscany
- Died: 19 August 1646 (aged 43); Florence, Grand Duchy of Tuscany
- Education: Domenico Passignano; Cristofano Allori; Giovanni Biliverti
- Known for: Painting
- Movement: Baroque

Francesco Furini (10 April 1603 – 19 August 1646) was an Italian Baroque painter, poet and priest. He was a leading painter in Florence in the second quarter of the 17th century and also worked in Rome. He was noted for both secular and religious subjects in which he used a sensual sfumato style, particularly in the many female nudes.

== Biography ==
He was born in Florence as the son of Filippo di Nicola and Francesca di Lazzaro Rossi. His father was a portrait painter who had trained under Domenico Passignano. Francesco's sister Alessandra also became a painter and another sister, Angelica, was a singer at the court of Cosimo II de' Medici, Grand Duke of Tuscany.

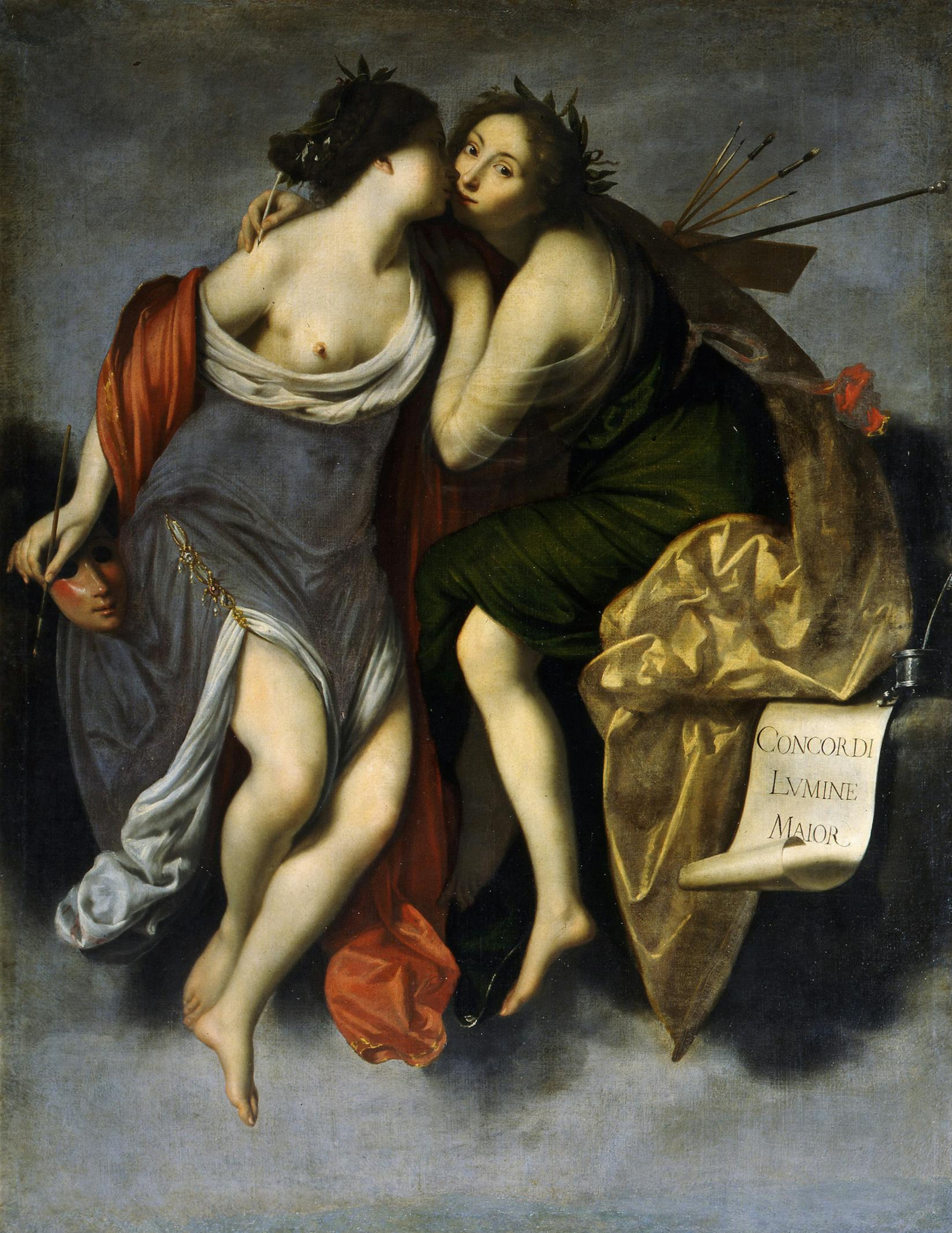
Allegory of Painting and Poetry, 1626, Palazzo Pitti

Furini received his initial training from his father. He then may have studied first with Passignano and then with his father's friend Cristofano Allori or in the reverse order first with Allori and then with Passignano. He then studied with Giovanni Biliverti and possibly Matteo Rosselli (whose other pupils include Lorenzo Lippi and Baldassare Franceschini). He obtained his father's permission to visit Rome to study its antiquities and Raphael's work. He arrived in November 1619 in Rome where he frequented the workshop of Bartolomeo Manfredi, the leading Caravaggesque painter. He also befriended Giovanni da San Giovanni who came to Rome in mid-1621. The two artists worked together on the fresco of the Chariot of Night, commissioned by Cardinal Enzo Bentivoglio for the Monte Cavallo palace, now Palazzo Pallavicini-Rospigliosi. His first dated and signed work is the Crucifixion with the Saints Bartholomew, Magdalen and John the Baptist of 1623 in the Saint Bartholomew Church in Todi, Umbria.

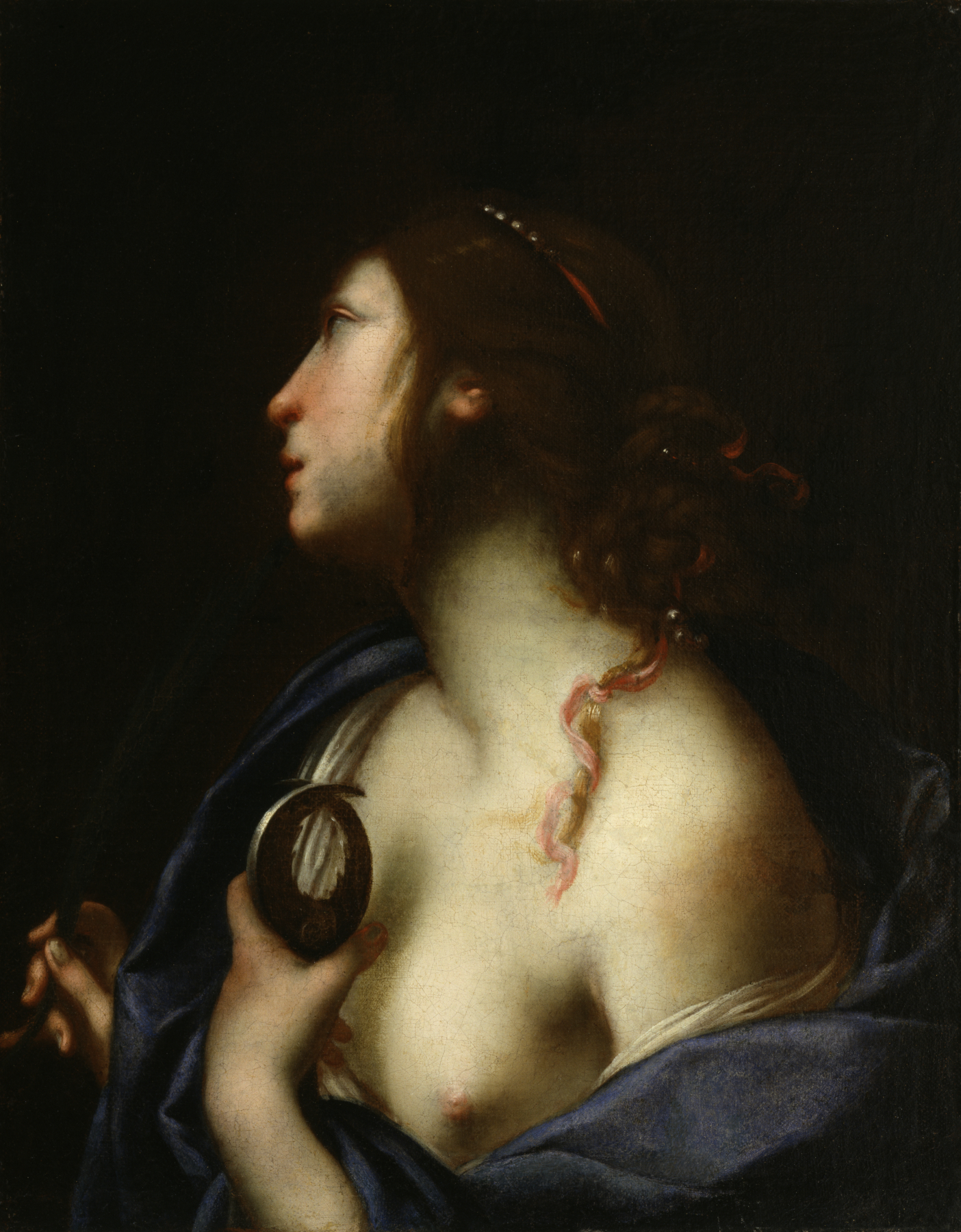
St. Agatha, c. 1635–1645, Walters Art Museum, Baltimore, United States

Around 1624 he returned to Florence where he collaborated with Matteo Rosselli. Furini became in 1633 a priest in the parish of Sant'Ansano in Mugello. This did not reduce his interest in depicting the female nude as in the Lot and his daughters (1634, Prado). The painting also shows his interest in Antique sculpture as the nude daughter viewed from behind is based on the Medici Venus (Uffizi).

He traveled to Rome again in the year before his death in 1646.

Among his pupils are Simone Pignoni and Giovanni Battista Galestruzzi.

== Work ==
Furini was a painter of biblical, allegorical and mythological set-pieces with a strong use of the sfumato technique. His work reflects the tension between the Mannerist style of Florence and the new Baroque style. In the 1630s his style was similar to that of Guido Reni. An important early work, Hylas and the Nymphs (1630), features six female nudes that attest to the importance Furini placed upon drawing from life.

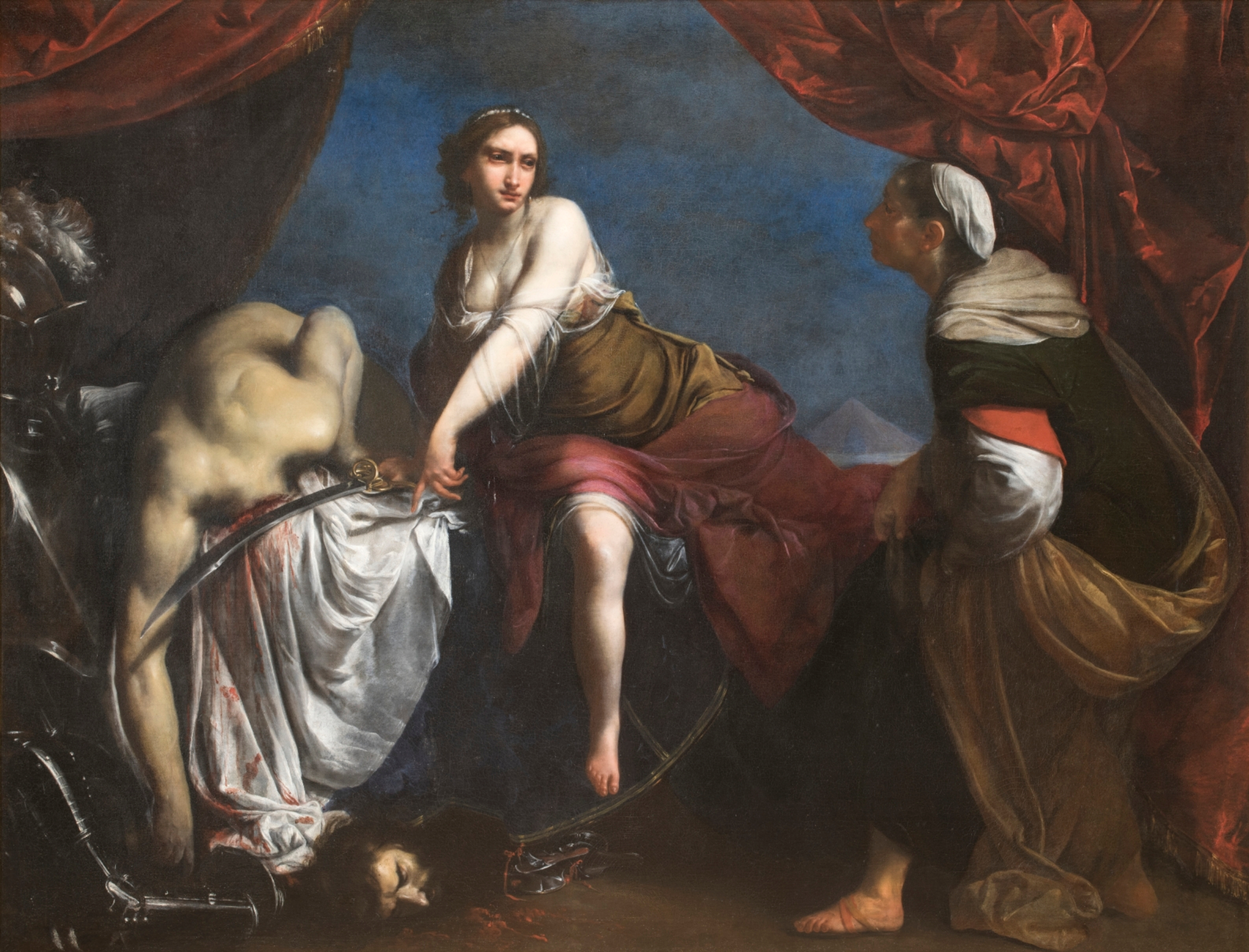
Judith and Holofernes, 1636

Freedberg describes Furini's style as filled with "morbid sensuality". His frequent use of disrobed females is discordant with his excessive religious sentimentality while his polished stylization and poses are at odds with his aim of expressing highly emotional states. His stylistic choices did not go unnoticed by more puritanical contemporary biographers like Baldinucci.

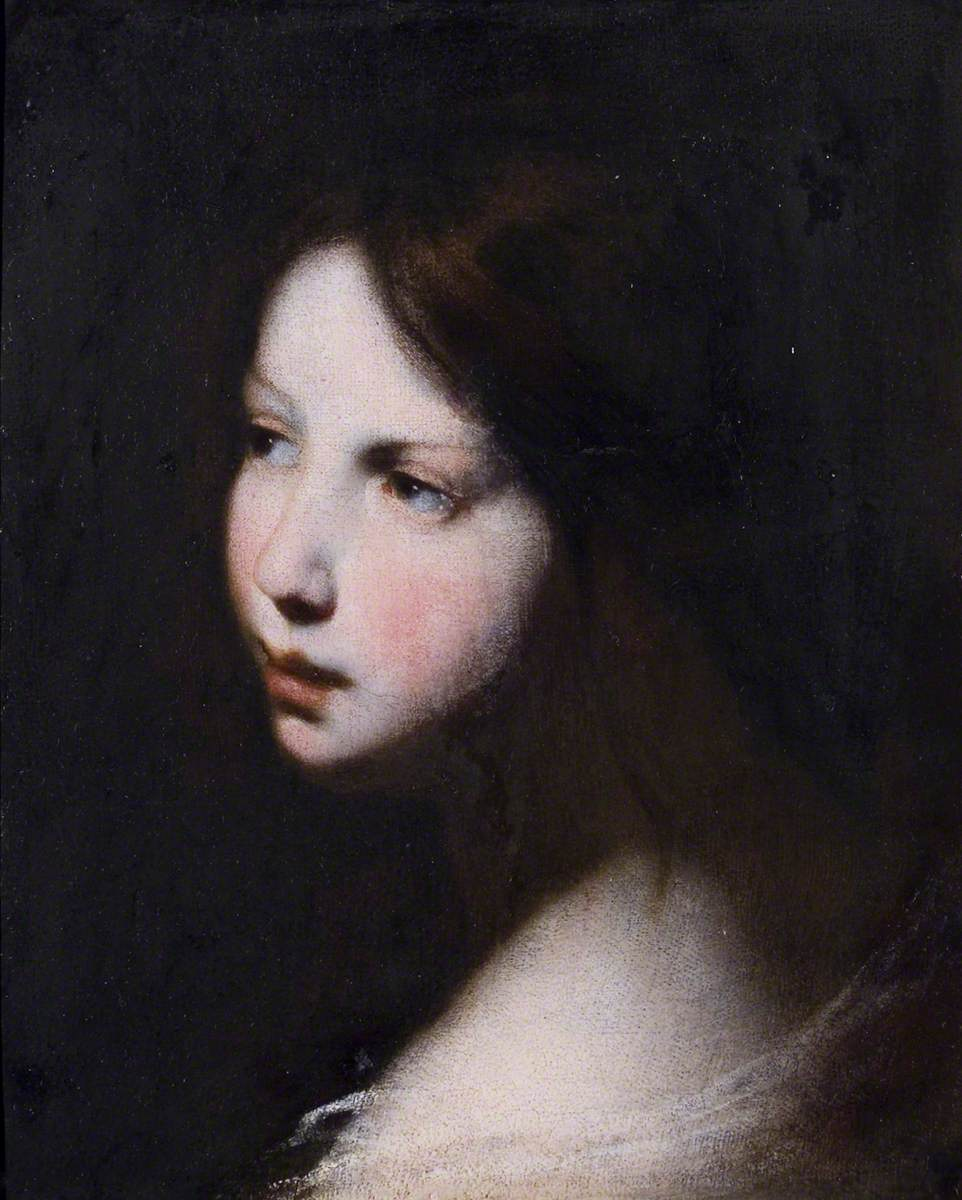
Head of a Girl

Ferdinando II de' Medici commissioned him to paint frescoes in Palazzo Pitti which he completed between 1639 and 1642. Furini frescoed two large lunettes depicting the Platonic Academy of Careggi and the Allegory of the Death of Lorenzo the Magnificent, which are at odds with the style of his canvases. The frescoes can be seen as a response to Pietro da Cortona, who was at work in the palazzo during these years.

Simone Pignoni was influenced by Furini's sensual style.

== Legacy ==
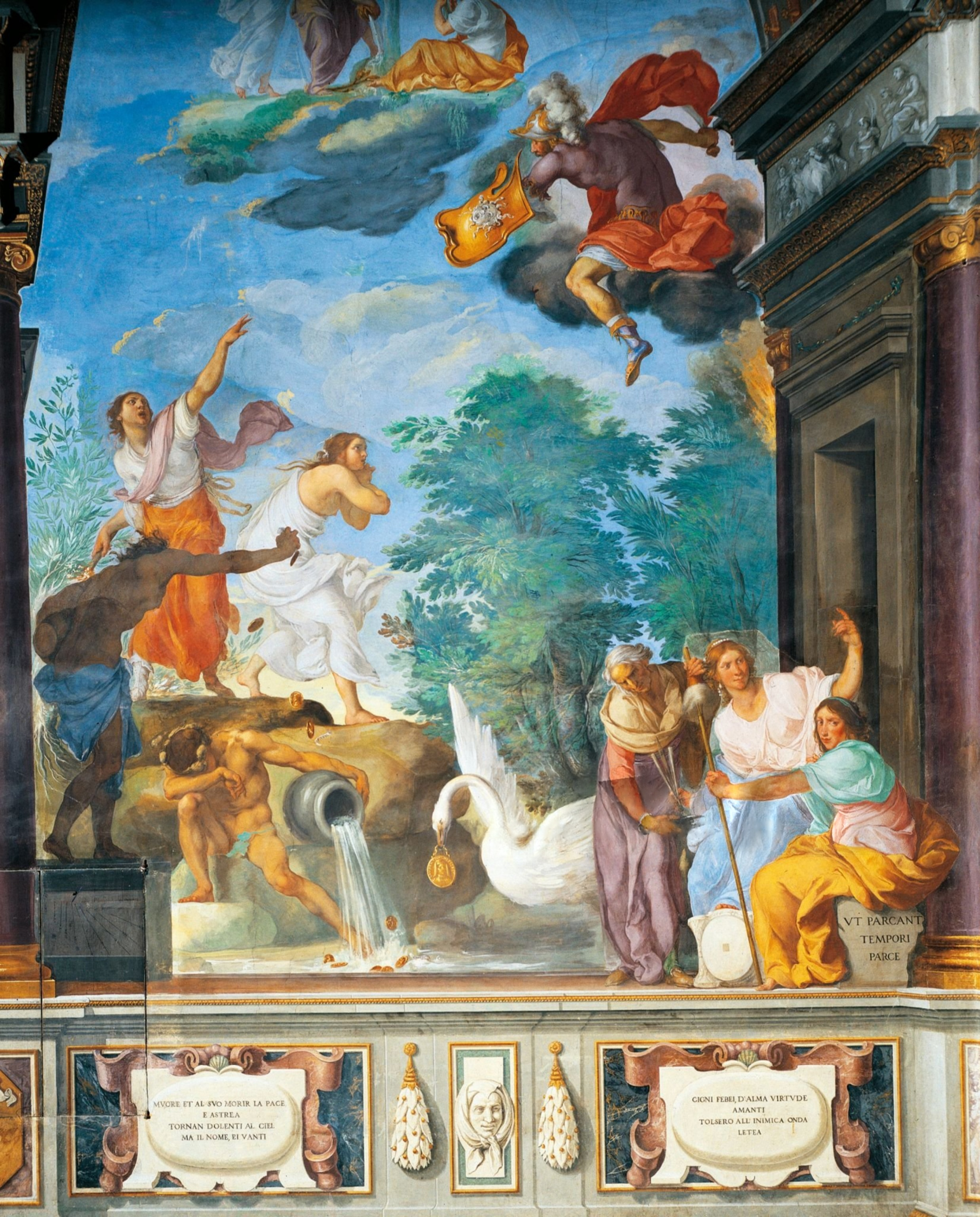
Allegory of the death of Lorenzo the Magnificent

In Robert Browning's series of poems titled Parleyings with certain people of importance in their day, the poet envisions Furini refuting Filippo Baldinucci's allegation that, on his deathbed, he had ordered all his nude paintings to be destroyed. For Browning, the nudity of Furini's subjects shows his courageous search for the hidden truth. Modern research has demonstrated that Furini did not abandon his sensual painting subjects on becoming a priest.

Furini was rediscovered in the early 20th century by Arturo Stanghellini. His scantily documented career was sketched by Elena Toesca (Furini, 1950) and brought into focus with an exhibition of his drawings at the Uffizi, 1972.

== Sources ==
- Campbell, Malcolm (1972). "Francesco Furini Drawings at the Uffizi". The Burlington Magazine. 114 (833): 571–570.
- Cantelli, G.; Furini, F. (1972). Disegni di Francesco Furini: e del suo ambiente. Firenze: Olschki. OCLC 2045642.
- Freedberg, Sydney J. (1993). Pelican History of Art (ed.). Painting in Italy, 1500-1600. pp. 344–345 Penguin Books Ltd.
- Langmuir, Erika (2008). "Francesco Furini. Florence". The Burlington Magazine. 150 (1263): 431–433.
