= Baldassare Franceschini =

Italian painter (1611–1689)

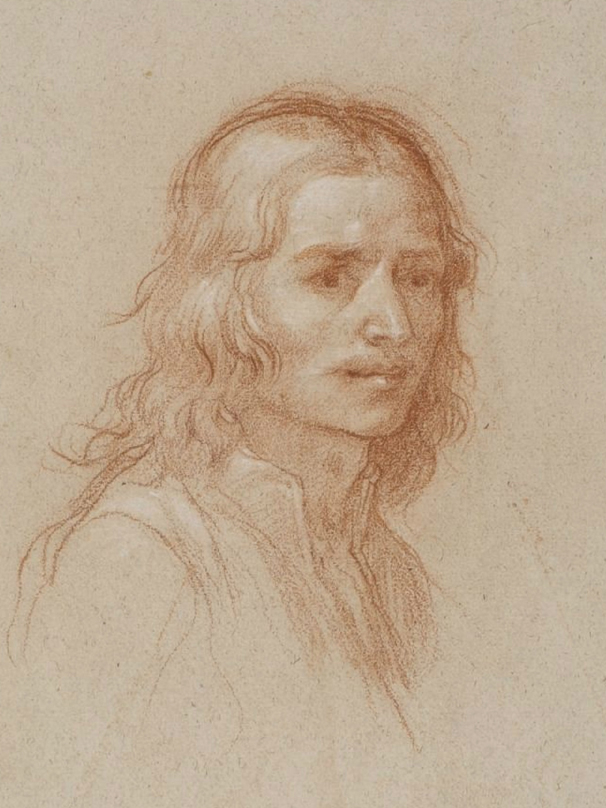
Self-portrait

Baldassare Franceschini, called Il Volterrano after his birthplace Volterra and, to distinguish him from Ricciarelli, Il Volterrano Giuniore (1611 – 6 January 1689) was an Italian late Baroque painter and draughtsman active principally around Florence and Volterra. He was mainly known for his frescoes, altarpieces and easel paintings for churches and palaces in Florence, Volterra and Rome. His subject matter was diverse and included portraits, biblical and mythological scenes, history paintings and allegorical compositions.

== Life ==
He was born in Volterra as the son of the sculptor Gaspare. At an early age, he worked as an assistant to his father and subsequently apprenticed with the Florentine artist Cosimo Daddi in Volterra. During the time of his apprenticeship his talents were discovered by the local notable Ludovico Guarnacci and the Marquese Curzio Inghirami, brother of the more powerful Julio, secretary of Christina of Lorraine. The Marquese Inghirami placed him, at the age of sixteen, under the Florentine painter Matteo Rosselli. Both Francesco Furini and Lorenzo Lippi also trained with Rosselli. Within a year, he had advanced sufficiently to execute frescoes in Volterra with skilled foreshortening, followed by work for the Medici family in the Villa Petraia.

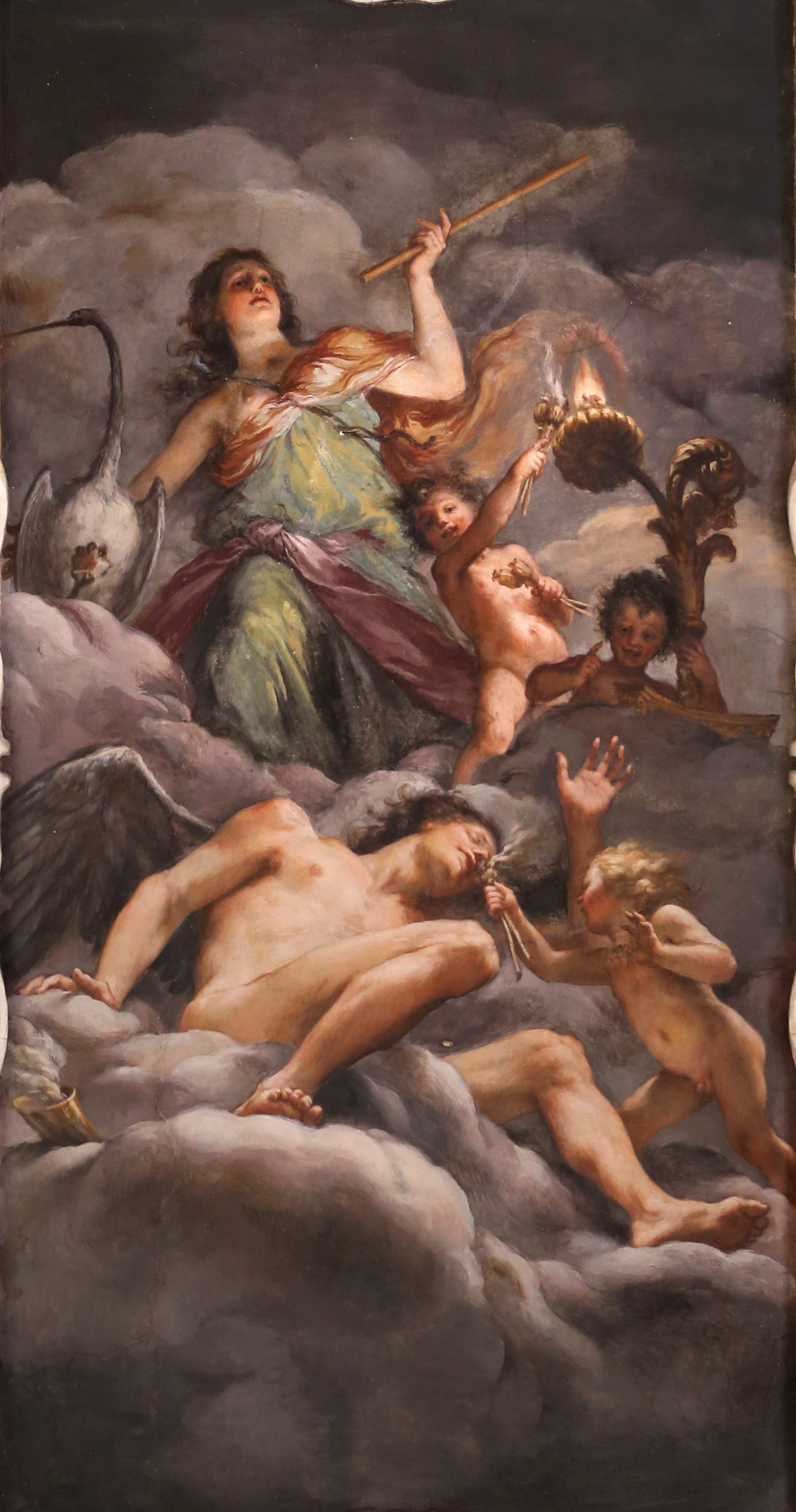
Vigilance and Sleep

Franceschini received his first major commission from Don Lorenzo de' Medici, who asked him to decorate the courtyard of Villa La Petraia with scenes illustrating the history of the Medici family. This project took 12 years to complete, but secured his reputation among the most important Florentine families as the city's most important fresco painter. In 1652, the Marchese Filippo Niccolini, planning to employ Franceschini on the frescoes for the cupola and back-wall of his chapel in Santa Croce, Florence, dispatched him to various parts of Italy to improve his style. The painter, in a tour that lasted some months, took a serious interest in the schools of Parma and Bologna, and, to some extent, in the Romano-Tuscan style of Pietro da Cortona, whose acquaintance he made in Rome. He then undertook the paintings commissioned by Niccolini.

Among his pupils were Massimiliano Soldani-Benzi, Antonio Franchi, Benedetto Orsi, Michelangelo Palloni, Domenico Tempesta, and Cosimo Ulivelli.

Franceschini died of apoplexy at Volterra on 6 January 1689.

== Work ==
Franceschini was a better fresco painter than an artist in oils. His works in the latter medium were frequently left unfinished, although numerous examples remain. The cabinet pictures are marked by much invention. His style was initially influenced by Rosselli and then enriched by the technique of Mannozzi. He acquired Flemish traits from Justus Sustermans and finally adopted the complex chromaticism of Emilian influence, as a result of his journeys to Bologna, Ferrara, Venice and Parma undertaken at the expense of Don Lorenzo between 1640 and 1641. His style is often distinguished by theatrical effects.

He painted frescoes celebrating the Medici ancestry for the inner court of the Villa Petraia. The influence of his decorative style on Volterrano's work at the Villa Petraia is clear. They include a painting of the hunchbacked court jester. Among his best oil paintings on a large scale is the St. John the Evangelist in the church of Santa Chiara, Volterra. One of his latest works is the fresco in the cupola of the Annunziata, Florence, which occupied him for two years towards 1683.
