= Palazzo Inghirami, Volterra =

Building in Tuscany, Italy

Coordinates: 43.40131°N 10.86009°E

The Palazzo Inghirami is an aristocratic palace with a main façade on Via Marchesi, on the corner with Piazza Martire della Liberta, (Note: In the 19th-century, this was called the Piazza dei Ponti) in Volterra, in the province of Pisa, region of Tuscany, Italy. The main façade of the palace was commissioned in the early 17th-century by Jacopo Inghirami, Admiral of the Grand-Duchy of Tuscany.

== History ==
The design of the mannerist façade on Via Marchesi has been attributed to Gherardo Silvani, but other sources suggest that it was constructed by Giovanni Battista Caccini in 1613–1618. The palace extends into a stone gothic palace to the south. This wing was erected in the 19th century in a gothic revival style by the architect Giuseppe Partini, commissioned by Michelangelo Inghirami.

The palace is accessible mainly by appointment. The entrance portal is surmounted by a bust of Cosimo II de' Medici, the patron of admiral Jacopo Inghirami. In the inner courtyard are displayed a number of Etruscan funerary urns excavated from lands owned by the Inghirami family. The interior rooms of the palace contain a bust of the admiral by Felice Palma, and an archive of the family containing maps and drawings by the admiral. A replica of the Raphael Portrait of Tommaso Inghirami is on display.

== See also ==
- Curzio Inghirami
