= Curzio Inghirami =

Italian archaeologist and historian

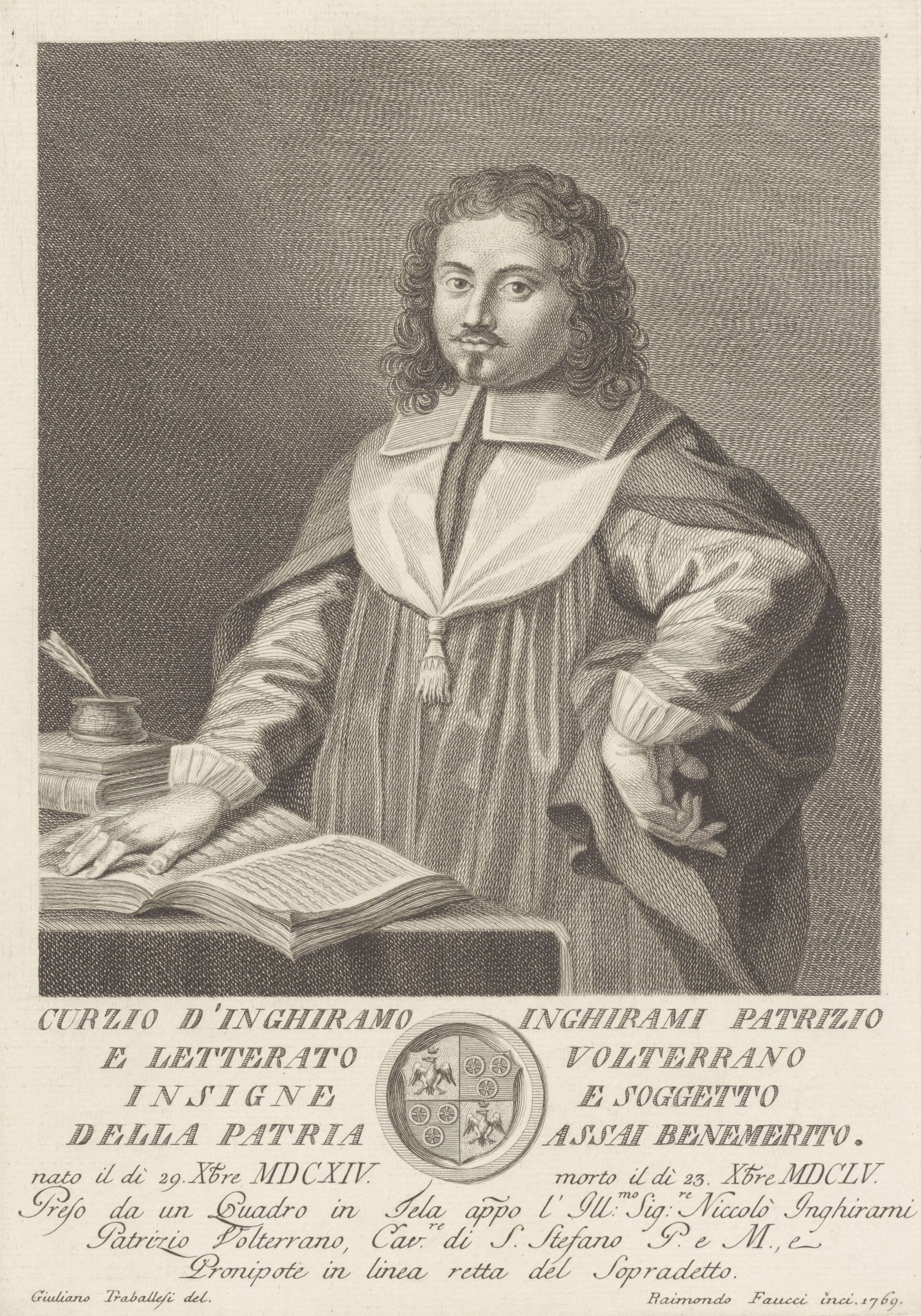
- Curzio Inghirami
- Born: December 29, 1614; Volterra, Grand Duchy of Tuscany
- Died: 23 December 1655 (aged 40); Volterra, Grand Duchy of Tuscany
- Occupations: archaeologist and historian
- Known for: Etruscarum antiquitatum fragmenta

Curzio Inghirami (Volterra, 29 December 1614 — 23 December 1655), was an Italian archaeologist and historian, but also a forger of Etruscan artifacts.

== Biography ==
Curzio Inghirami was born in Volterra to an illustrious family with ties to the House of Medici.

In 1637 he published in Ethruscarum antiquitatum fragmenta (Frankfurt, 1637) the artefacts he had allegedly discovered in 1634-35 near his family's estate at Scornello, a hilltop near the city of Volterra. Curzio, who was nineteen years old at the time, unearthed a little capsule made of wax, resin, pitch, hair and mud containing ancient writings purportedly written in an undecipherable Etruscan script and in Latin. The discovery of this artefact, named ‘scarith’, was followed by hundreds of similar others, all containing accounts and prophecies written around 62 BC by one Prosperus Fesulanus, a novice in training to become an Etruscan priest (haruspex), from the prehistory of Italy to the fall of Etruria at the hands of the Romans in the 1st century BC. These texts, the topography of Volterra and several objects – such as a lamp and an incomplete figurine – are displayed in woodcuts and engravings throughout the book.

In reality, the discoveries were ingeniously fabricated by Inghirami, inspired by the forger of Etruscan antiquities Annio da Viterbo (1437–1502). A debate regarding their authenticity, involving scholars from all over Europe, arose soon after publication. Many urged in favour of the authenticity of these Etruscan artifacts, citing that Inghirami was too young an antiquary at the time of the discovery to devise a forgery; and that he could not decipher them; and also that when fresh searches were made of the spot, additionally similar artifacts were disinterred, where evidently they had long lain. Notwithstanding the erudition of the forger, however, the true artifacts of antiquity betrayed the modern assembly of these scariths. While they included undecipherable uncial letters, attributed to an undiscovered ancient Etruscan characters; it was more difficult to defend the presence of small italic letters, for they were not used in the age assigned to them; besides that, there were dots on the letter i, a custom not practiced till the eleventh century. The style was copied from the Latin of the Psalms and the Breviary. The Etruscan language was written in the wrong direction, and on paper, while all classical Roman historians have asserted that the Etruscans wrote their annals on linen cloth.

The work was publicly denounced for the first time in Méric Casaubon’s A treatise of use and custome (London, 1638). Leo Allatius definitively demonstrated that all the texts were fake in his polemic Animadversiones in antiquitatum etruscarum fragmenta (Paris, 1640), a work of considerable importance for the development of codicology. Nonetheless, Inghirami continued to advocate the authenticity of his work publishing a response in 1645. In 1985, the scarith were stolen from the Palazzo Inghirami, Volterra by thieves who mistook them for authentic documents. Despite being a fake, this work had the merit of "focusing the scholars' attention on Etruscan archaeology, also anticipating the elevation of this civilisation's culture and the anti-roman attitude that are characteristic of XVIII century Etruscology".

== Works ==
- Inghirami, Curzio (1637). Etruscarum antiquitatum fragmenta (in Latin). Francofurti.
- Inghirami, Curzio (1645). Discorso di Curzio Inghirami sopra l'opposizioni fatte all'antichità toscane diuiso in dodici trattati (in Italian). Firenze: per Amadore Massi, e Lorenzo Landi.

== Bibliography ==
- Rowland, Ingrid D. (2004). The Scarith of Scornello: A Tale of Renaissance Forgery. University of Chicago Press. ISBN 9780226730363.
- Deitz, Luc (2003). "Die Scarith von Scornello: Fälschung und Methode in Curzio Inghiramis 'Ethruscarum antiquitatum fragmenta' (1637)". Neulateinisches Jahrbuch (in German) (5): 103–133.
- Fiore, Camilla (2012). ""I seem to go wandering sweetly for Etruria". Discoveries and antiquarian nature of Etruria by Curzio Inghirami and Athanasius Kircher". Storia dell'arte (133): 53–81. ISSN 0392-4513.
- « Inghirami, Curzio », Enciclopedia Treccani, 15 March 2011 Online
