= Francesco Conti (painter) =

Italian painter (1681–1760)

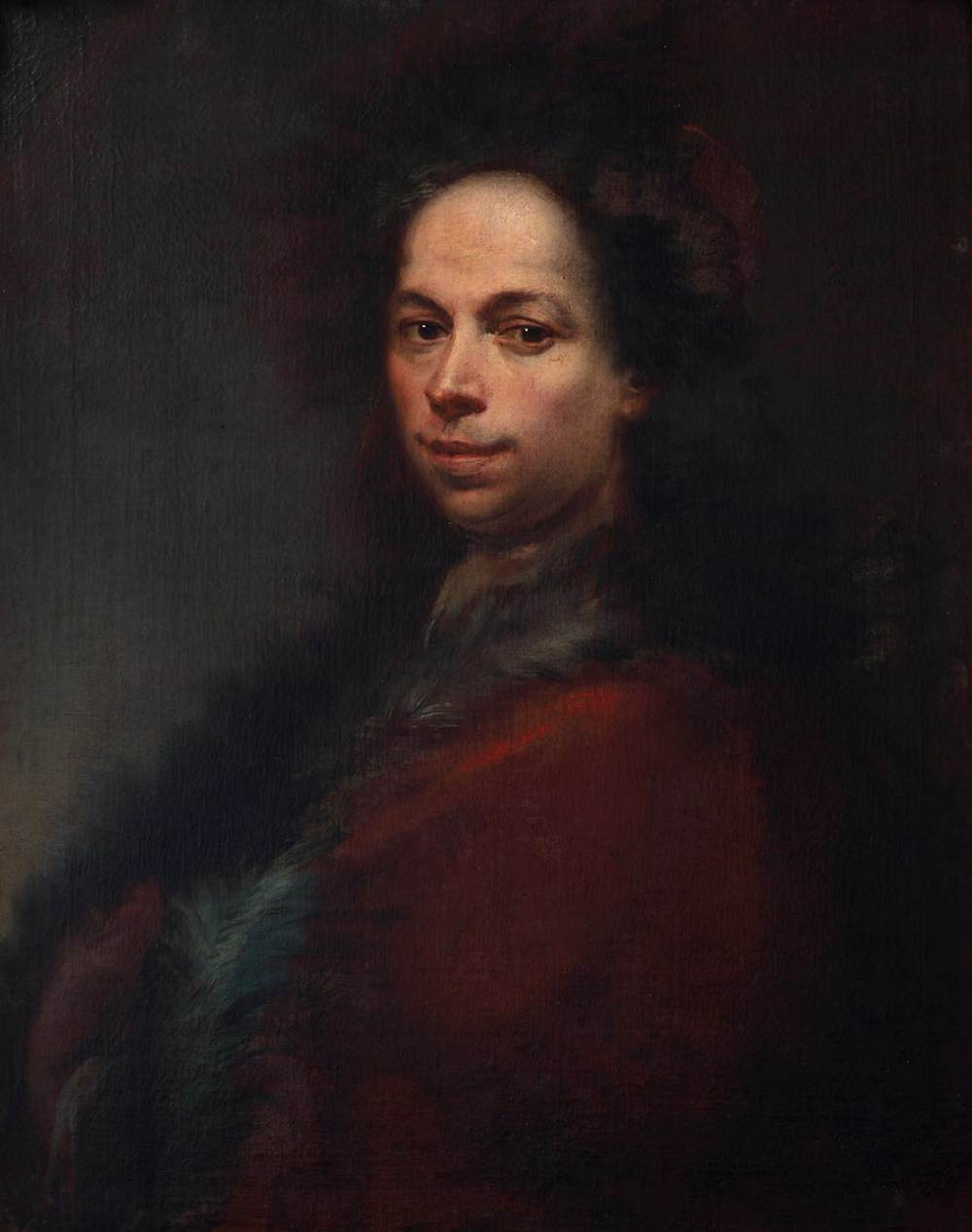
Self-portrait (1720s)

Francesco Conti (14 March 1681 – 8 December 1760) was an Italian Baroque painter, primarily of religious scenes.

== Biography ==
He was born in Florence to Carlo and Umiltà Ciabilli, and was probably a relative of the painter Giovanni Camillo Ciabilli. When or why he adopted the name "Conti" is unknown.

His formative years were spent in the artistic circle of Simone Pignoni then, when he was eighteen, he went to Rome, where he was a student of Giovanni Maria Morandi and Carlo Maratta. He also painted portraits for the Albani family. In late 1700, he returned to Florence. He was supported then and throughout his career by the succeeding Marquises Riccardi, who regularly commissioned paintings from him and provided a salary.

He produced his first known canvases in 1709, for the Riccardi pavilion. These depicted the virtues of Fame, Faith, and Peace and are among his very few secular works. Influenced by Sebastiano Ricci, he abandoned his Classical style in favor of chiaroscuro. Notable paintings from this period include a Madonna for the parish church of Sant'Alessandro a Giogoli (1715), and a Saint Abundius for the Villa La Quiete (1729). Most of his works were altarpieces.

In 1736, Gian Gastone de' Medici, Grand Duke of Tuscany, appointed him master of drawing for the children of his gallery architects, preparatory to the Accademia delle Arti del Disegno, of which he was already a member. The appointment was confirmed the following year by the new Grand Duke, François Étienne of Lorraine. Among his pupils was Anna Bacherini Piattoli.

His masterpiece is generally considered to be the Madonna and Child with Saint Sylvester I, Saint Paul and Saint Catherine of Alexandria (1738), which was commissioned for the Church of Sant'Andrea by the Rucellai family. In his later years, he was also active in Pisa. He died in 1760 in Florence.

== Gallery ==
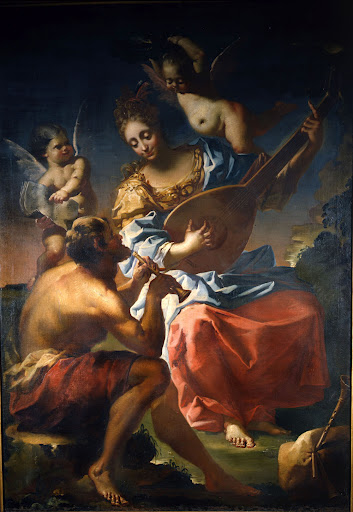
Allegory of Music

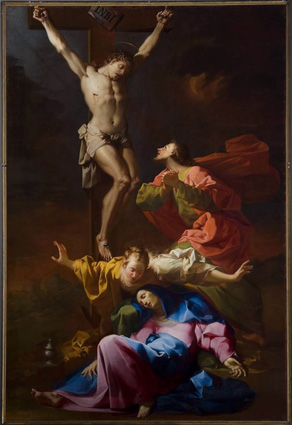
The Crucifixion of Jesus, with the Virgin Mary at the bottom

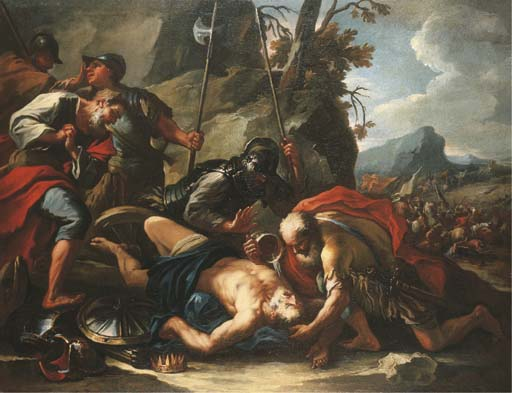
The death of King Josiah

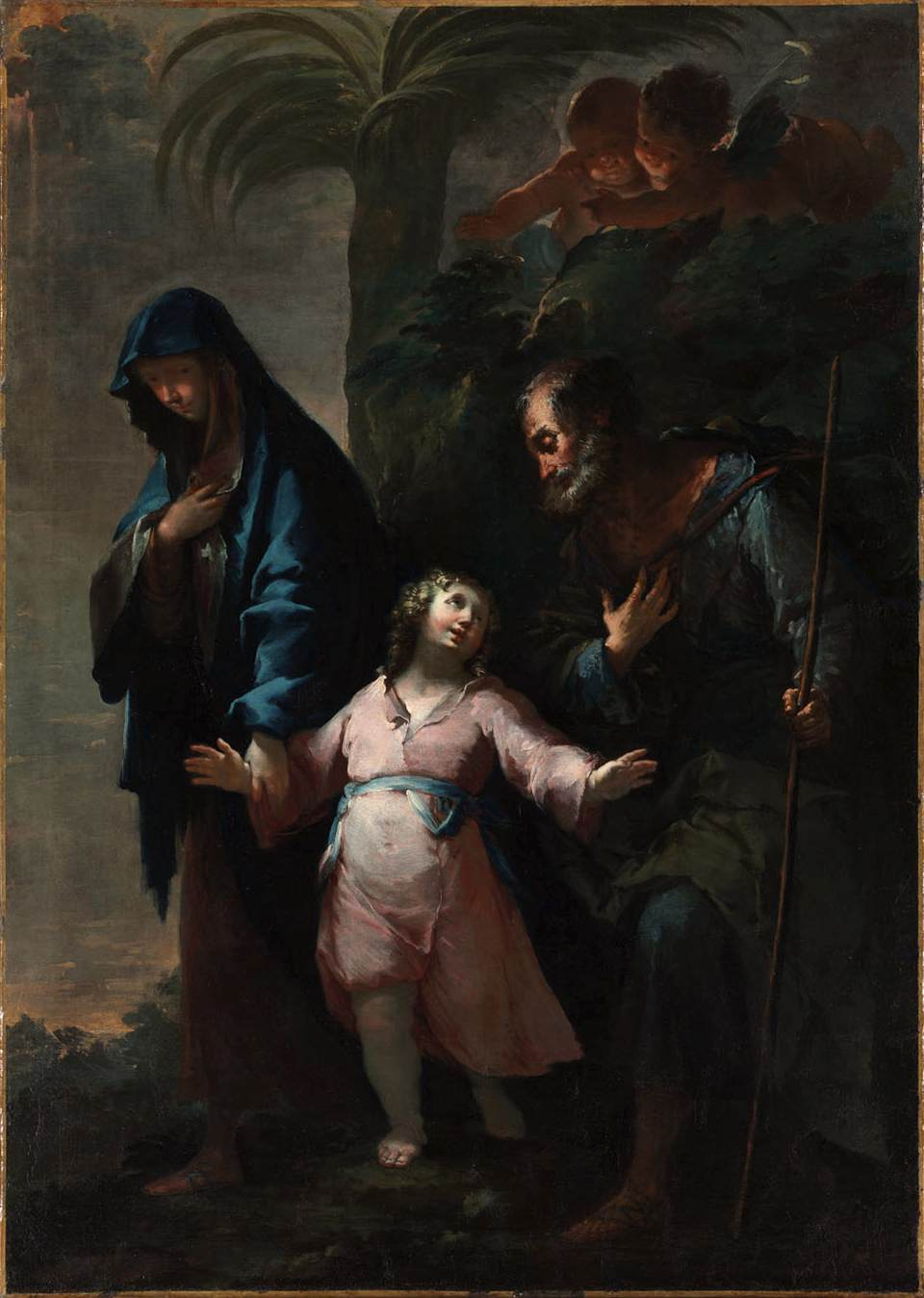
The Holy Family returns to Nazareth from Egypt

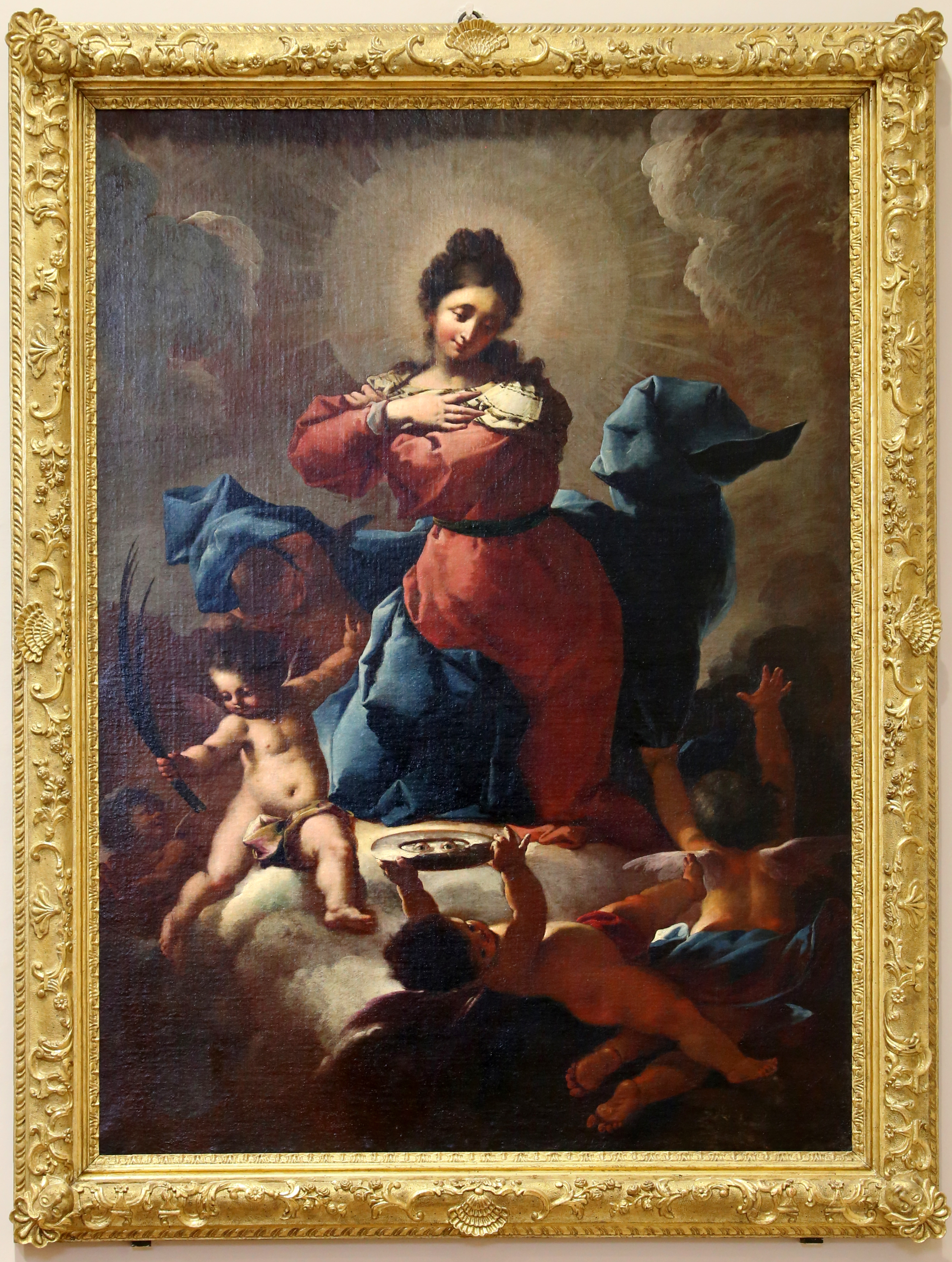
Saint Lucy

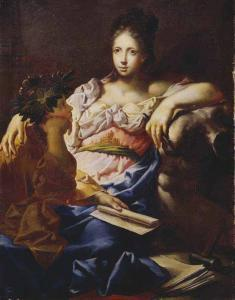
Allegory of Culture

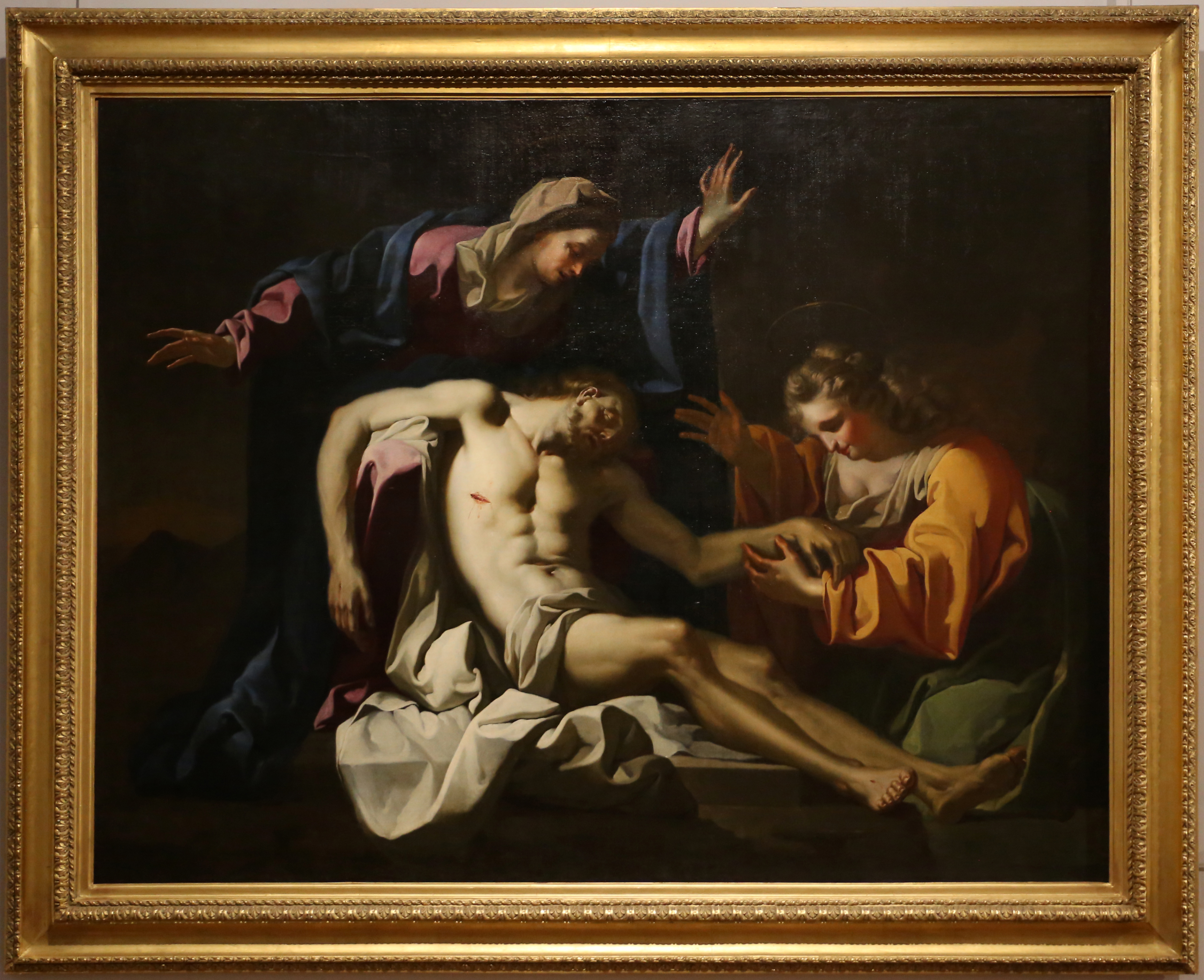
Lamentation of the dead Christ
