= Sant'Andrea, Montecarlo (Tuscany) =

Roman Catholic church in Montecarlo, Lucca, Tuscany, Italy

Coordinates: 43°51′05″N 10°40′04″E

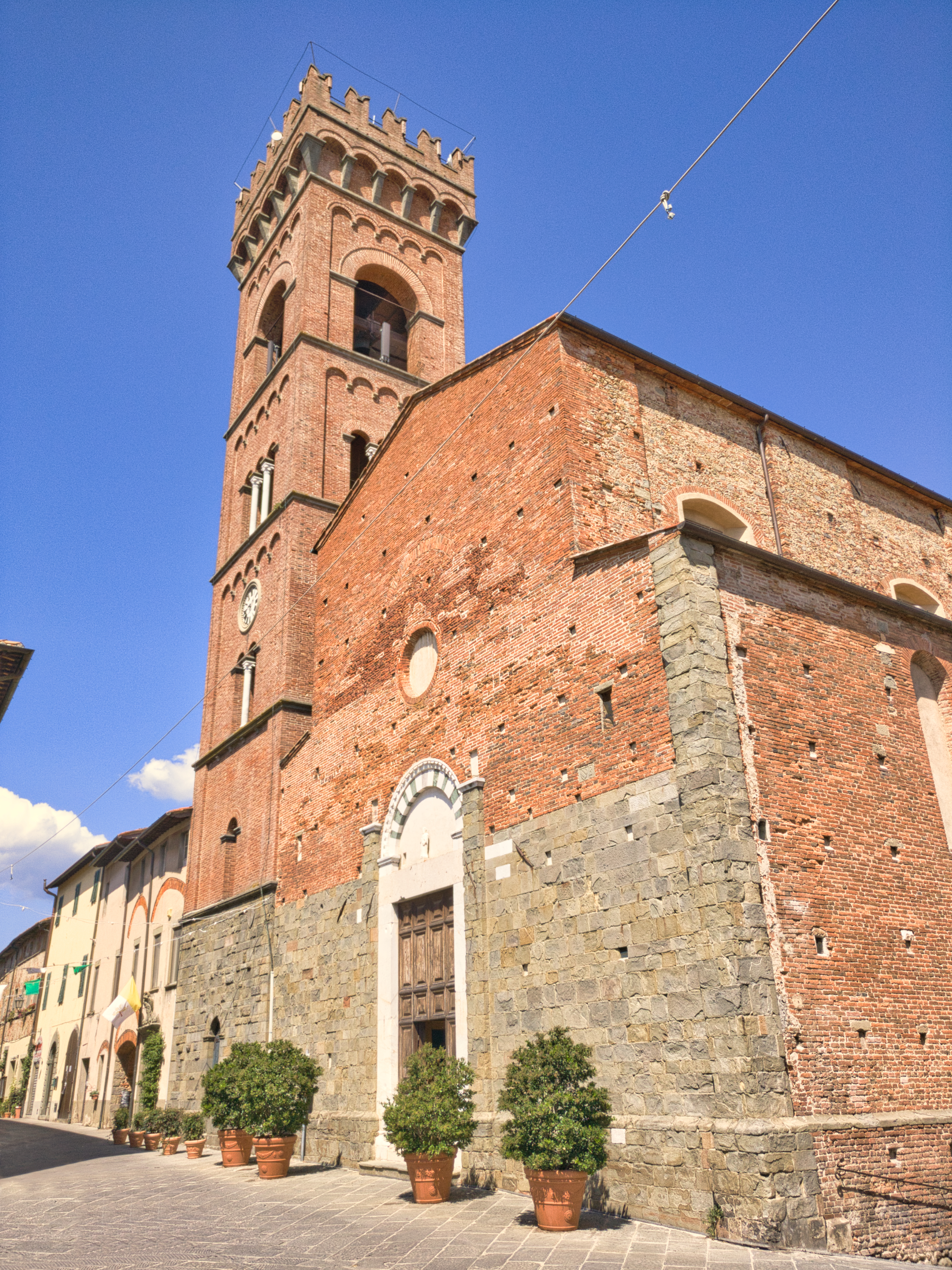

Sant'Andrea is Roman Catholic church in Montecarlo, province of Lucca, region of Tuscany, Italy.

== History ==
The church was erected from 1332 to 1334, adjacent to the fortress protecting the newly founded town. The former town of Vivinaia had been razed by the Florentines, and when its former inhabitants moved to this locale, they erected this church dedicated to the same saint of their prior church in their prior neighborhood. It was immediately granted the permission to baptize, a function then withdrawn from the parish church of San Piero in Campo.

The exterior facade is made of stone in the lower register, and brick superiorly. The bell-tower was built later. The interior was refurbished in 1783, under the architect Giuseppe Vannetti, and has three naves, with lateral chapels. The Chapel of the Rosary houses the parish museum and has a canvas depicting the Madonna and Child (1434) by Francesco Anguilla and a statue of St Anthony Abbot (circa 1410). The Chapel of the Madonna del Soccorso has a venerated 15th-century fresco depicting the Virgin saving a child from the grip of the devil. The crypt causes the presbytery to be elevated relative to the rest of the nave. The main altar shelters the relics of San Vincenzino, transferred here from the Catacombs of Santa Ciriaca in Rome.

In an 1896 survey, the church had an altarpiece in the second altar to the right depicting a Crucifixion with the Madonna and Saints by Francesco Bianchi, who also painted canvases depicting Sant'Ubaldo and San Dionisio for the church. In the 3rd altar on the right, there is a depiction of John the Baptist and Saints by Antonio Franchi. At the altar in the crossing is a canvas depicting the Martyrdom of St Laurence attributed to Alessandro Tiarini. The choir has a Saints Andrew, Peter, and other Fishermen by Innocenzio Ansaldi. In the left crossing is a depiction of the Virgin of the Assumption by Bastiano da Montecarlo. A chapel here was designed in 1806 by Ansaldi and frescoed by Ignazio da Camajore (Gabrielli Ignazio). The 3rd chapel on the left has an altarpiece depicting the Virgin and Saints by Francesco Conti. There are also frescoes by Ferdinando Folchi in the church.
