= Antonio Franchi =

Italian painter (1638–1709)

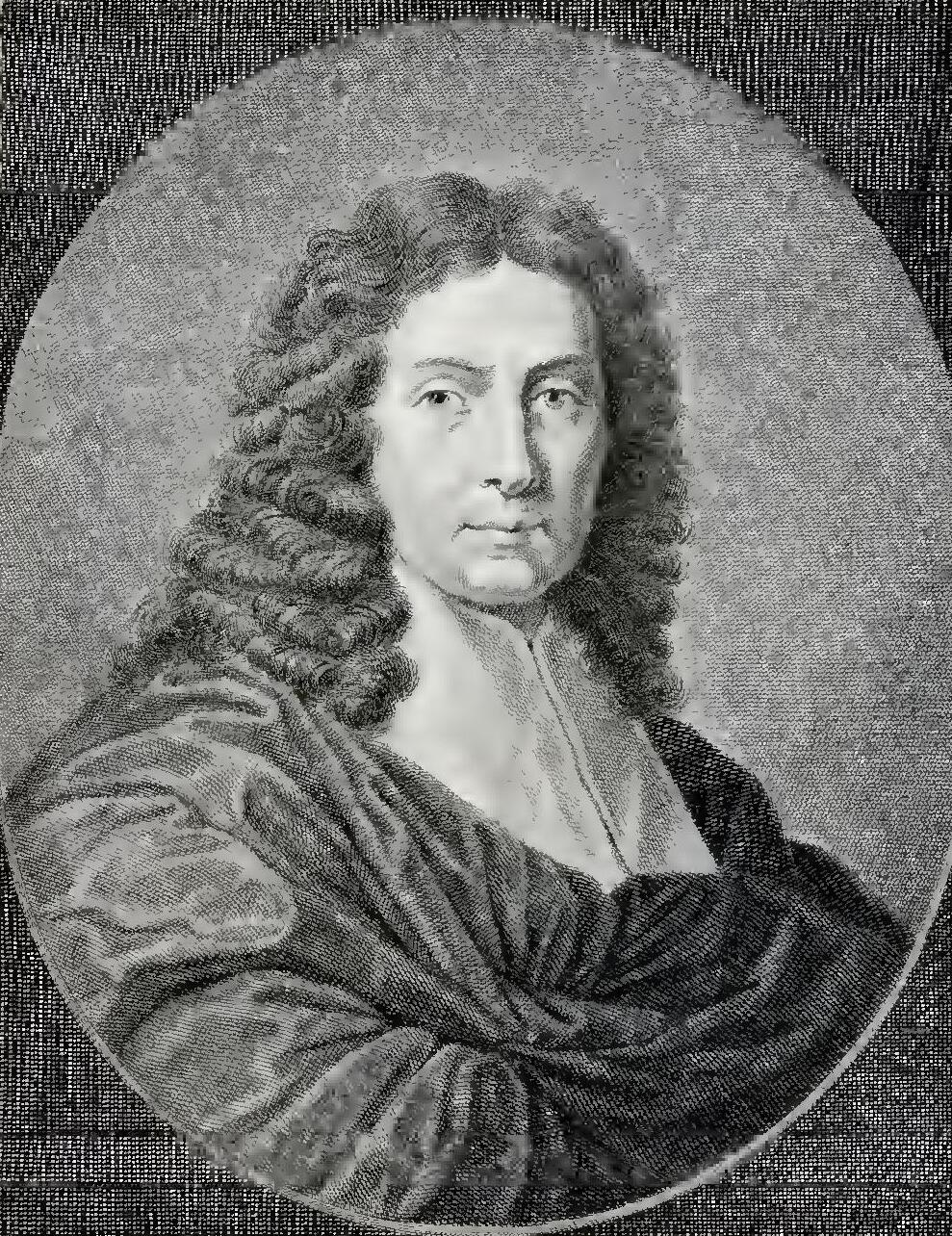
- Born: 14 July 1638; Villa Basilica, Republic of Lucca
- Died: 18 July 1709 (aged 71); Florence, Grand Duchy of Tuscany
- Resting place: San Felice
- Other name: Il Lucchese
- Occupations: Painter; art theorist
- Years active: 1655–1709

Antonio Franchi (14 July 1638 – 18 July 1709) was an Italian painter and art theorist of the 17th century, active mainly in Florence and Lucca.

== Early life and education ==
Born in Villa Basilica, he is also called Il Lucchese. Initially training in Lucca with Domenico Ferrucci, he moved for over a decade (1655–67) to Florence, to work with Felice Ficherelli and Baldassare Franceschini. His style unites Neoclassical and Baroque elements and reflects his study of the art of Guido Reni, Pietro da Cortona and Peter Paul Rubens. He returned to Lucca in 1668: most of his early work is to be found there or in the surrounding area (e.g. Saints Worshipping the Trinity, 1665; Lucca, Santa Maria dei Servi, and Saints Lucy, John the Baptist, Francis Xavier and Others, c. 1670; Montecarlo, Sant'Andrea).

== Court painter ==
In 1674, he established himself in Florence, first under the patronage of the Strozzi family and later under the Medici. The Temple of Love and The Sacrifice (both Florence, Galleria Corsini) were probably painted in that year for the Marchese Pier Francesco Rinuccini and are among his most accomplished works, inspired by Cortona’s romantic vision of the ancient world. In 1683, he was admitted to the Accademia del Disegno, and in 1684, he painted various biblical and mythological scenes for Ferdinando de' Medici, Grand Prince of Tuscany, all untraced except for the Garden of Love (Rome, Palazzo Montecitorio). In 1686, the Grand Duchess Vittoria della Rovere appointed Franchi as her official portrait painter. He was inspired by the tradition of court portraiture established by such French artists as Pierre Mignard, yet brought to it a new informality and a sharper sense of character.

Among his portraits are Lucrezia Rinuccini Corsini (1681; Florence, Galleria Corsini), the seven portraits of Anna Maria Luisa de' Medici made at the time of her marriage (1691), and a series of portraits of ladies (1690–91) painted for the private apartment of Violante Beatrice of Bavaria (Florence, Depositi Gallerie). Franchi’s religious works include Joseph’s Vision (Florence, San Giovannino degli Scolopi), the Madonna of the Rosary (Pescia, Prepositura), both dating from 1694, and the frescoes depicting scenes from the Life of Saint John the Baptist (1699–1701; Florence, San Frediano in Cestello). He painted a Saint John Gualbert in prayer for the Chapel of the saint in the Vallombrosa Abbey and a Madonna and Bambino for the church of Santa Marta, Montopoli in Val d'Arno. Franchi's paintings have the porcelain crispness of design, characteristic of Carlo Dolci, and some the sensuality of a Francesco Furini.

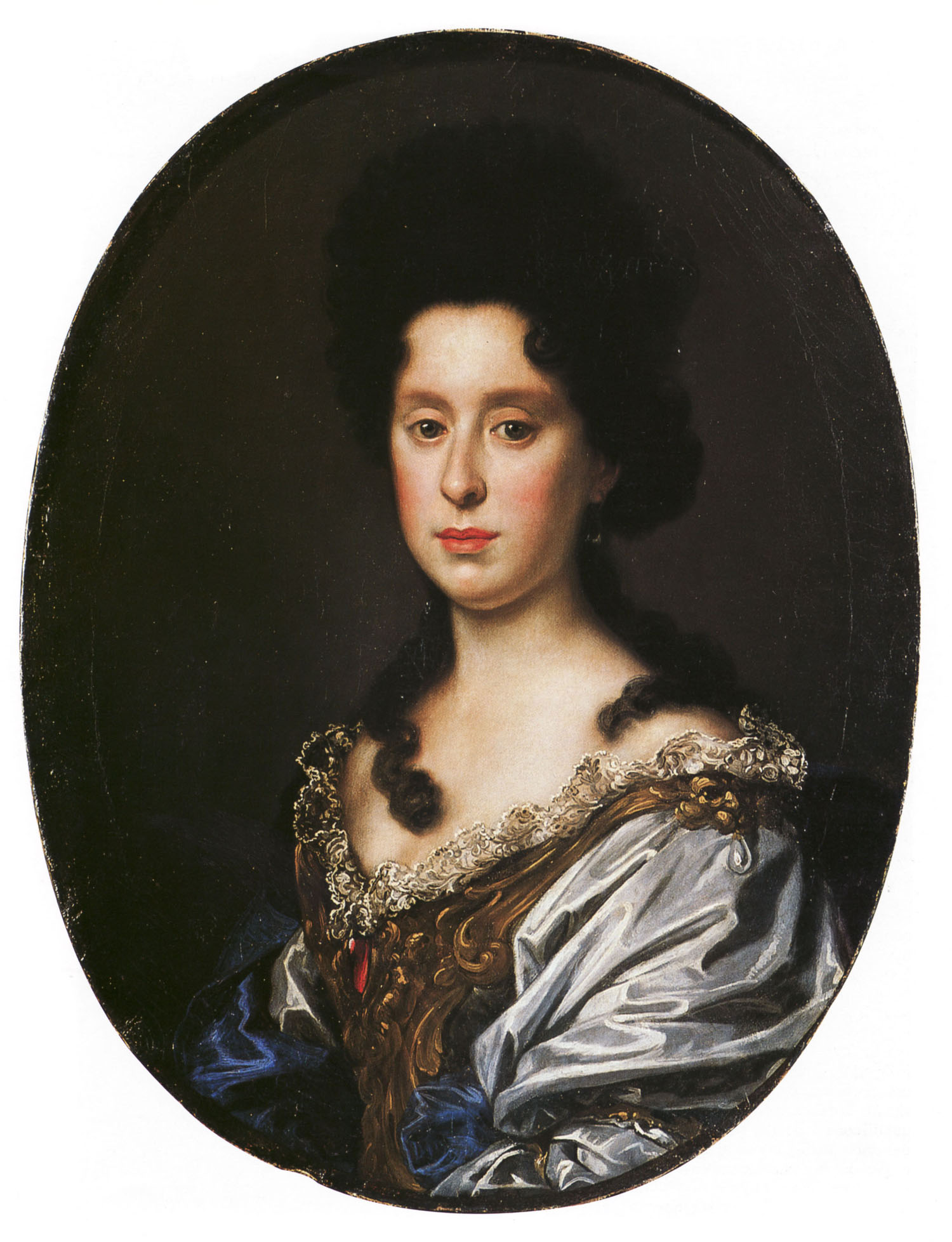
Antonio Franchi, Anna Maria Luisa de' Medici, 1690

== Theorical works ==
Apart from painting, Franchi had scholarly interests: he studied philosophy and worked on scientific inventions. His treatise on painting, Trattato della teorica pittoresca, was completed shortly before his death but left unpublished until 1739, when Giuseppe Rigacci (fl. 1740) oversaw its publication, dedicated it to the Florentine collector and biographer Niccolò Gabburri, and even provided it with a new title: La teorica della pittura. Rigacci may also have altered the structure and contents of the treatise. A few days before his death, Franchi described his ‘little treatise’ to the painter and theorist Ludovico David, whose L’amore dell’arte had influenced him: the first section was to have four chapters of general introduction, followed by five chapters on the forms of painting (chiaroscuro; reflected colour and colour harmony; perspective; colours in shadows; foreshortening) and finally four chapters on particular artistic problems (reflections on water; drapery folds; painting cupolas).

Franchi’s contemporary biographers said that he was a follower of the great colourists, and this interest is reflected in his concern for colour and light. Although he described two aspects of disegno (perspective and foreshortening), others, such as anatomy, proportion and the study of antiquity, were omitted. He ignored the literary basis of painting (invention), although there is mention of it in the published work (chaps. 19–20, 23). Despite his Venetian sympathies as an artist, as a critic and pedagogue, he found that his contemporaries painted too quickly and too abundantly. The second section was planned as a miscellaneous collection of topics relating to connoisseurship and artistic taste (e.g. ‘How to distinguish good from bad pictures’; ‘What people mean when they say a picture is well brushed’; ‘It is shown that speed in painting is incompatible with perfection’). The published work has a more traditional pedagogic format that depends largely upon Gian Paolo Lomazzo.

== Death ==
He died on 18 July 1709 in Florence. He is buried in the San Felice.

== Writings ==
- La Teorica della Pittura ovvero Trattato delle Materie piu Necessarie per apprendere con fondamento Quest'Arte. Lucca: Salvatore e Giandomenico Marescandoli. 1739.
