= Scandicci =

- Comune
- Comune di Scandicci
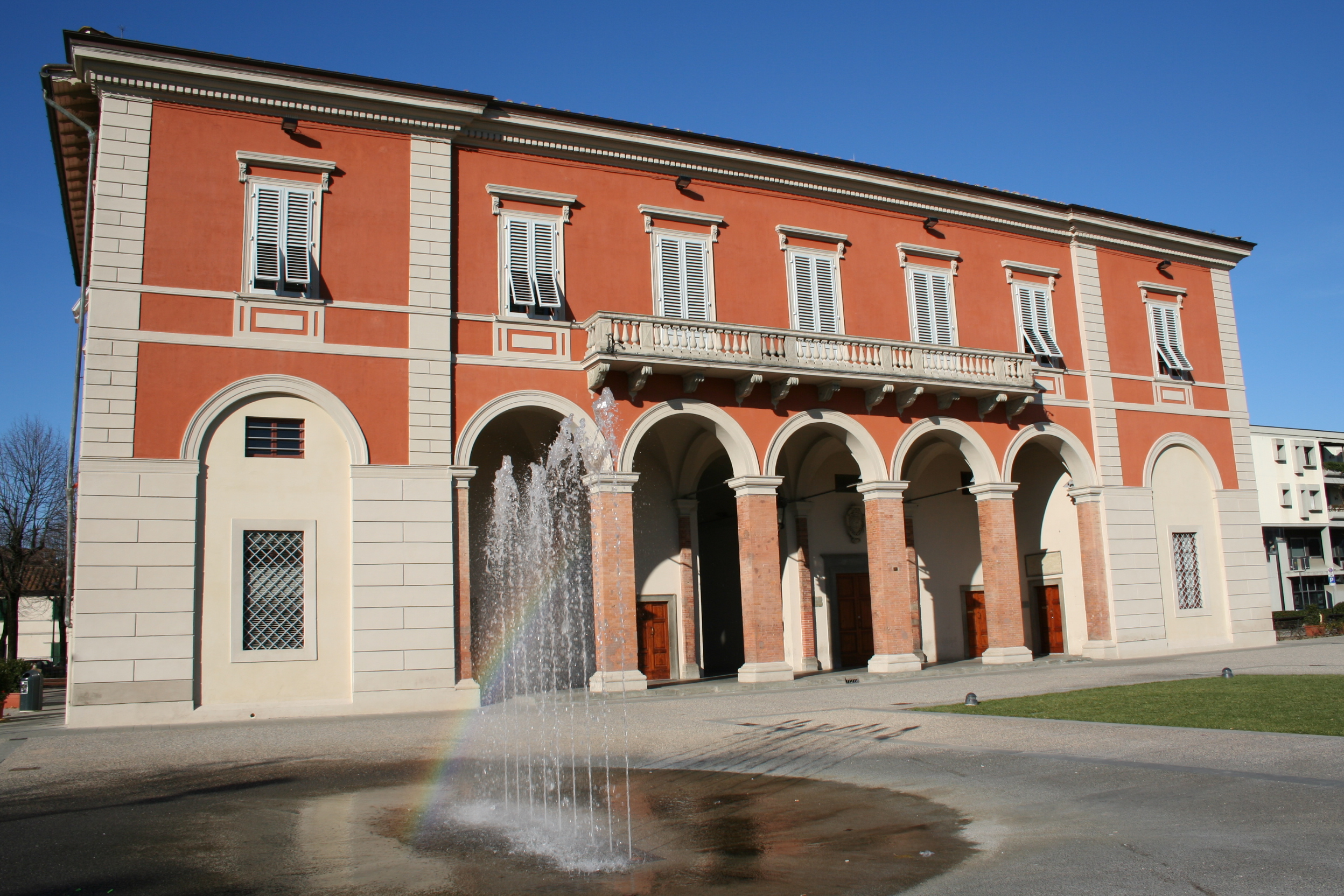
- The old town hall of Scandicci

- Location within Italy Location within Tuscany
- Coordinates: 43°45′16″N 11°11′22″E
- Country: Italy
- Region: Tuscany
- Metropolitan city: Florence (FI)
- Frazioni: Badia a Settimo, Capannuccia, Casellina, Granatieri, Le Bagnese, l'Olmo, Mosciano, Pieve a Settimo, Rinaldi, San Colombano, San Martino alla Palma, San Michele a Torri, San Vincenzo a Torri, Santa Maria a Marciola, Scandicci Alto, Vingone, Viottolone

Government
  - Mayor: Sandro Fallani (Democratic Party)

Area
  - Total: 59.6 km^{2} (23.0 sq mi)
- Elevation: 47 m (154 ft)

Population (30 November 2014)
  - Total: 50,517
  - Density: 848/km^{2} (2,200/sq mi)
- Demonym: Scandiccesi
- Time zone: UTC+1 (CET)
  - Summer (DST): UTC+2 (CEST)
- Postal code: 50018
- Dialing code: 055
- Patron saint: St. Zenobius
- Saint day: May 10
- Website: Official website

Scandicci (Italian pronunciation: [skanˈdittʃi]) is a comune (municipality) of c. 50,000 inhabitants in the Metropolitan City of Florence in the Italian region Tuscany, located about 6 kilometres (4 miles) southwest of Florence.

Scandicci borders the following municipalities: Campi Bisenzio, Florence, Impruneta, Lastra a Signa, Montespertoli, San Casciano in Val di Pesa, Signa.

The settlement of Scandicci appeared in 1774 as Torri, and was later enlarged to incorporate several neighbouring communities.

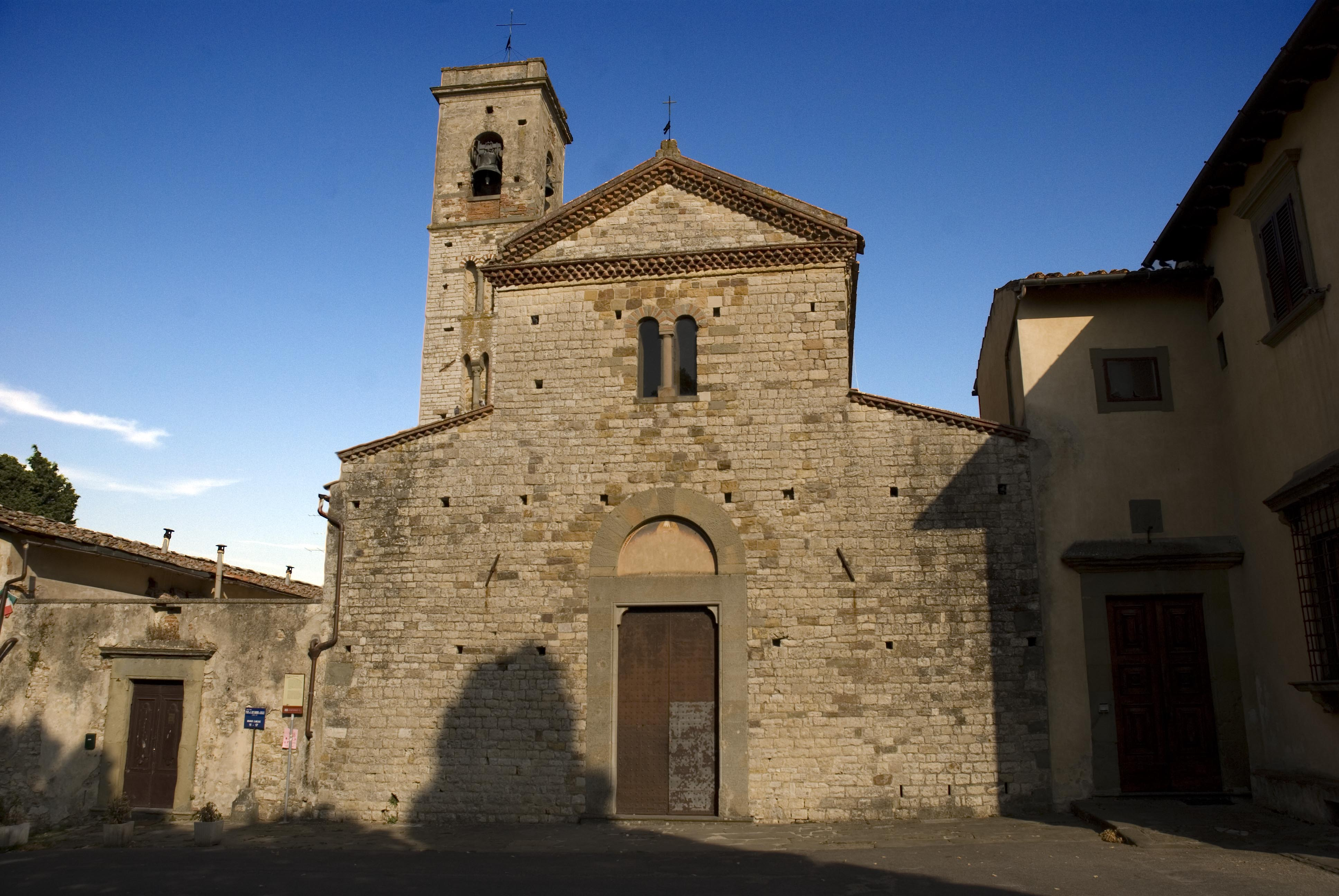
Pieve of Sant'Alessandro a Giogoli

== Main sights ==
- Villa i Collazzi, a Mannerist building whose design is attributed to Michelangelo.
- Villa Pestellini
- San Giuliano a Settimo - Badia or Abbey first documented from 774.
- Sant'Alessandro a Giogoli- Romanesque-style Pieve or parish church first documented from 1035; it has a nave with two aisles (the latter, together with the transept, decorated in Baroque style). In the rectory is a fresco by Ridolfo del Ghirlandaio and a canvas by Francesco Conti.
- Pieve di San Vincenzo
- San Martino alla Palma- Church with a 16th-century portico. The interior, on a single nave, houses a 14th-century Madonna with Child Enthroned.
- Sant'Andrea - Church at Mosciano, with some 13th-14th century paintings.
- Acciaiolo - 14th century defense structure and aristocratic manor, now in public ownership.

Nearby is also the Badia a Settimo.

== Public artwork ==
- "The Sun" sculpture of Aziz Ali Fuad

== Twin towns and sister cities ==
- Pantin, France

== Notable people ==
- Benozzo Gozzoli (born c. 1421 – 1497) in the village of Sant'Ilario a Colombano, an Italian Renaissance painter.
- Ruggero Cini (1933–1981), an Italian composer, producer, arranger and conductor.
- Danio Bardi (1937–1991), an Italian water polo player who competed in the 1960 and 1964 Summer Olympics.
