= Santa Marta, Montopoli in Val d'Arno =

Church in Montopoli in Val d'Arno, Italy

Coordinates: 43.67131°N 10.758393°E

Santa Marta
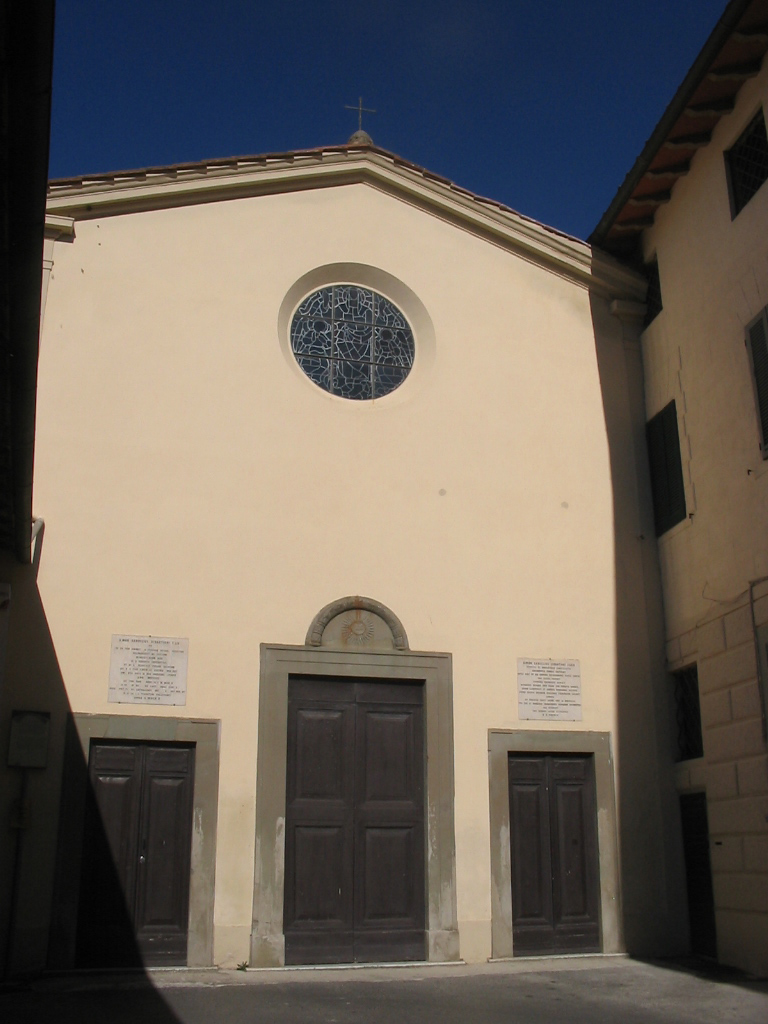
- Façade of the church.

Religion
- Affiliation: Roman Catholic
- Province: Pisa

Location
- Location: Montopoli in Val d'Arno, Province of Pisa, Tuscany, Italy
- Interactive map of Santa Marta

Architecture
- Type: Church
- Style: Romanesque
- Groundbreaking: 1332

Santa Marta refers a church and its associated former Roman Catholic monastery, now a conservatorio or school, located on Via del Falcone #30 in the urban center of Montopoli in Val d'Arno, in the province of Pisa, region of Tuscany, Italy.

== History and Decoration ==
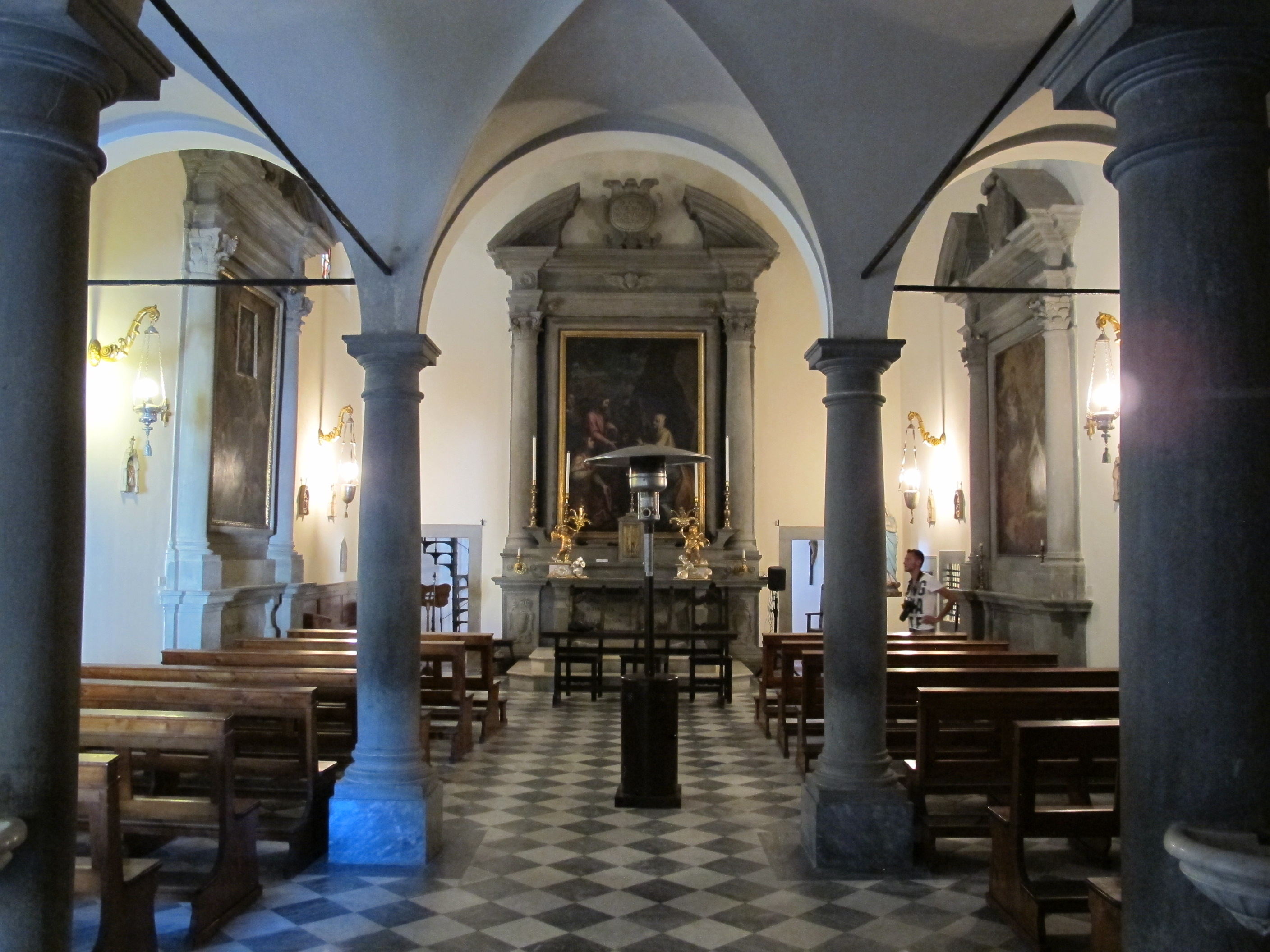
Interior

For a few years prior to his death in 1595, the rich local merchant Sebastiano Ganucci, who had no male heirs, meticulously planned to endow his daughter, Suor Artenia at a monastery in Pisa, as the abbess of a sustainable cloistered Augustinian convent. His will subsidized all the construction and dedication, including the four canons required to perform masses at the church.

Starting in 1589, with the approval of the municipal authorities, Ganucci used 600 scudi to buy the houses and land on this street. In 1590, with the blessing of the bishop, Ganucci led a procession and prayer ceremony to lay the first stones. The municipal authorities gave permission to the builders to gather stone and materials from various abandoned churches in the region. Worked progressed in building the wall surrounding the monastery and other buildings when Ganucci died in 1595. It appears that after his death, the bishop of Pisa laid claim on the inheritance of Ganucci, claiming that his daughter could no longer be abbess, and that the wall surrounding the monastery was not yet complete. The legal dispute was protracted. In 1607, the onslaught of the plague killed all four executors of the Ganucci estate. Their replacements, with the help of Simone, the widow of Ganucci, argued with the Pisan Bishop, among other points, that all of Montopoli was a walled town, hence apt for a monastery. An appeal to the Grand-Duke Cosimo II de Medici, allowed for the completion of the monastery. Suddenly in 1613, the Papal court in Rome made an argument that the inheritance, which had failed to form a monastery, should be transferred to them. This was strongly opposed by authorities in Montopoli, and ultimately resolved by 1618, when a visit had demonstrated nearly all the facilities and a church necessary for the function of a cloistered convent, including interior church, sacristy, dormitory, refectory, rooms for work, infirmaries, kitchen, and a parlatorio (parlor for conversing with the outer world). The visit made note of all the requirements to cloister the nuns, including windows through which to pass supplies for the kitchen, and screens so that the nuns could attend mass unseen. Ultimately the monastery received a papal bull of approval by Pope Paul V.

A belltower was built in 1657, and the church was completed in 1677, and consecrated in 1697. The exterior of the church has the heraldic coat of arms of Ganucci.

The convent continued functioning until 1785, when the Grand Duke Peter Leopold converted into a conservatory or school for girls led by oblates. Stripped of the religious affiliation by the French invasion, the convent was briefly refounded as a school by Grand Duke Ferdinand III of Lorraine. Over the course of the century, the school became progressively secular and funded by the state. Closed during the first world war, it reopened in 1923 as a school, becoming a middle school in 1953 and in 1954 an Istituto magistrale. The church was reconsecrated in 2011, and still holds much of the original major works, including a large altarpiece depicting the Resurrection of Lazarus (1677) by Cigoli, a Madonna and Child with St Dominic and Teresa by Antonio Franchi, a Madonna and Child with Saints Augustine and Clare by Michele Laschi, and a Madonna and Child (circa 1400) by Lorenzo Monaco. The church also had paintings by Santi di Tito and Simone Camaldolese. The structures are now used also for cultural events.
