= Giovanni Camillo Ciabilli =

Italian painter

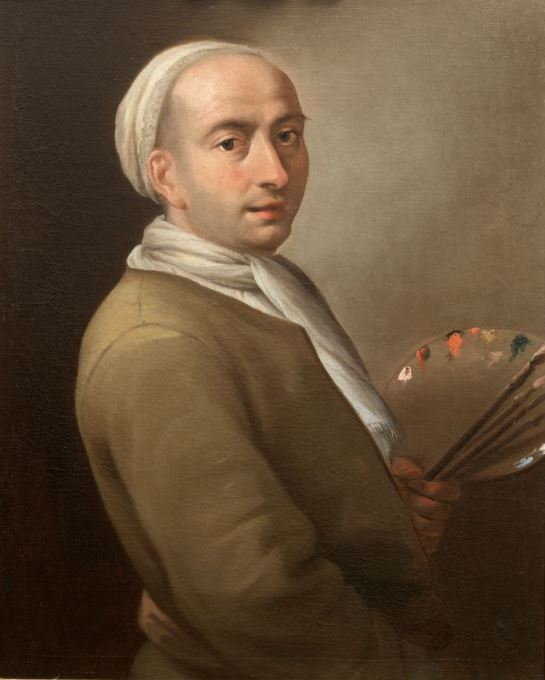
Self-portrait (before 1724)

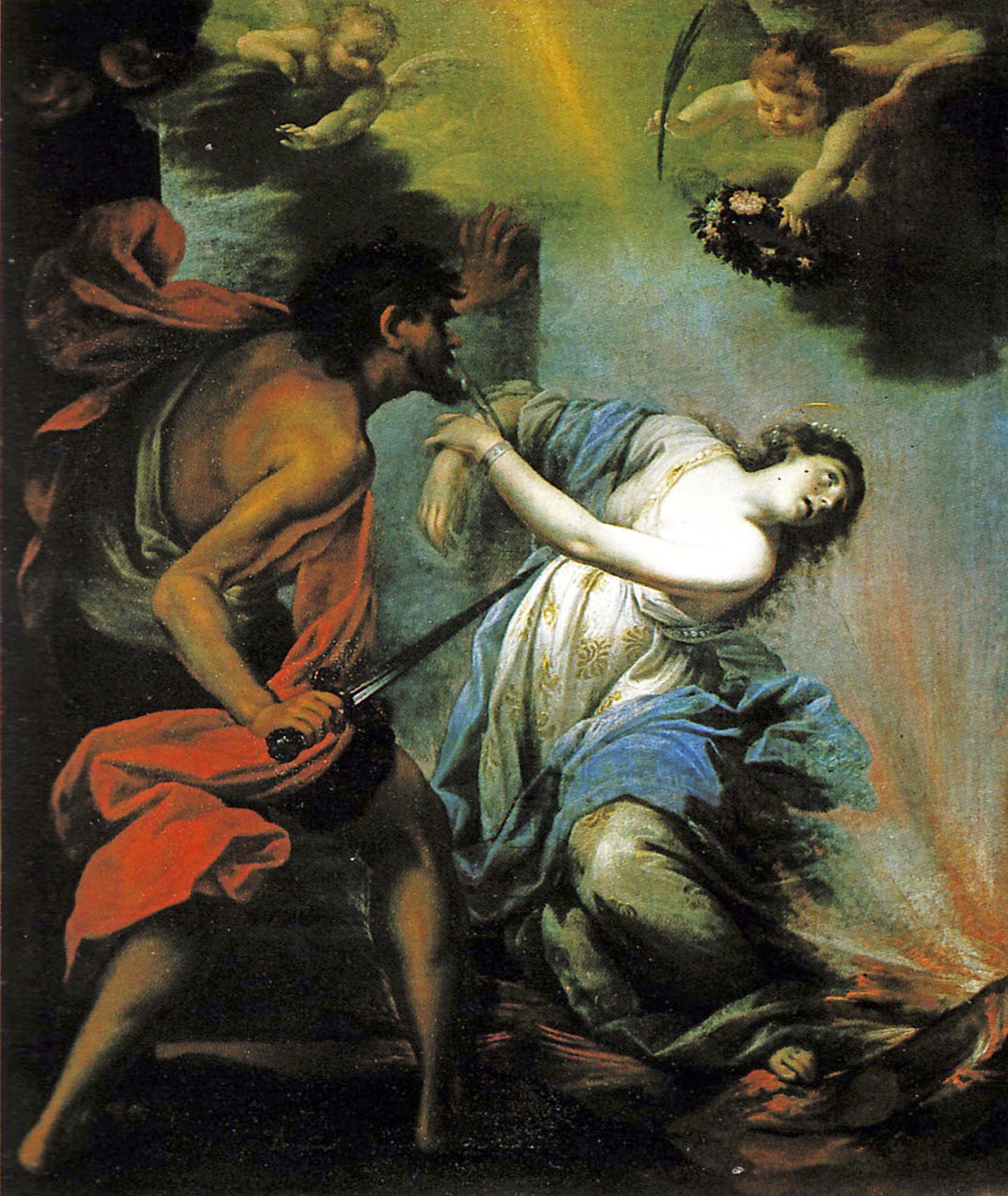
The Martyrdom of Saint Lucia

Giovanni Camillo Ciabilli (6 July 1675, Castello di Signa, Grand Duchy of Tuscany - 28 August 1746, Florence) was an Italian Baroque painter.

== Life and work ==
His career began in the workshops of the decorative painter, Simone Pignoni. From 1694 to 1696, he created an Assumption and a Coronation of the Virgin for the Guasconi family. He also painted panels at the church of San Bartolomeo in Pantano and the abbey of Badia a Settimo.

Later, he was commissioned to produce frescoes for the chapel at the church of San Frediano in Cestello: scenes from the life of Saint Anastasius, inspired by the works of Correggio. These were accompanied by allegorical figures, such as "Virtue", in the spandrels.

In 1712, he and several other painters were engaged to create twenty-four large tempera paintings for the Basilica of San Lorenzo, for the canonization of Pope Pius V. Four years later, he was granted Florentine citizenship, in recognition of the quantity and quality of his works.

He collaborated on the funeral apparatus for Cosimo III de' Medici. In 1737, he painted two large oval canvases of saints for the Compagnia di San Niccolò del Ceppo.

Several sources refer to him as a "military architect', but no such specific works have been identified.
