= Montecarlo, Tuscany =

Montecarlo
- Comune
- Comune di Montecarlo
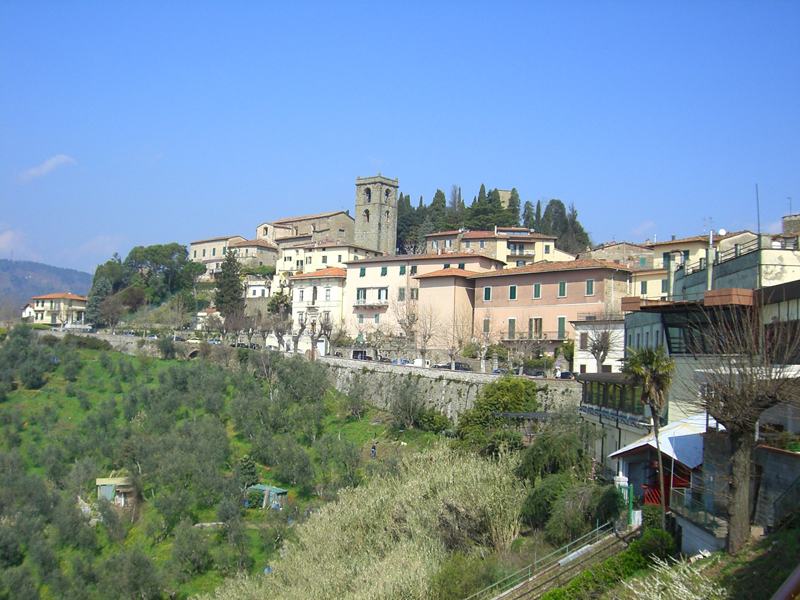

- Coat of arms

- Location within Italy Location within Tuscany
- Coordinates: 43°51′05″N 10°40′04″E
- Country: Italy
- Region: Tuscany
- Province: Lucca (LU)
- Frazioni: San Giuseppe, San Piero in Campo, San Salvatore, Turchetto

Government
  - Mayor: Vittorio Fantozzi

Area
  - Total: 15.67 km^{2} (6.05 sq mi)
- Elevation: 162 m (531 ft)

Population (31 March 2017)
  - Total: 4,397
  - Density: 280.6/km^{2} (726.8/sq mi)
- Demonym: Montecarlesi
- Time zone: UTC+1 (CET)
  - Summer (DST): UTC+2 (CEST)
- Postal code: 55015
- Dialing code: 0583
- Website: Official website

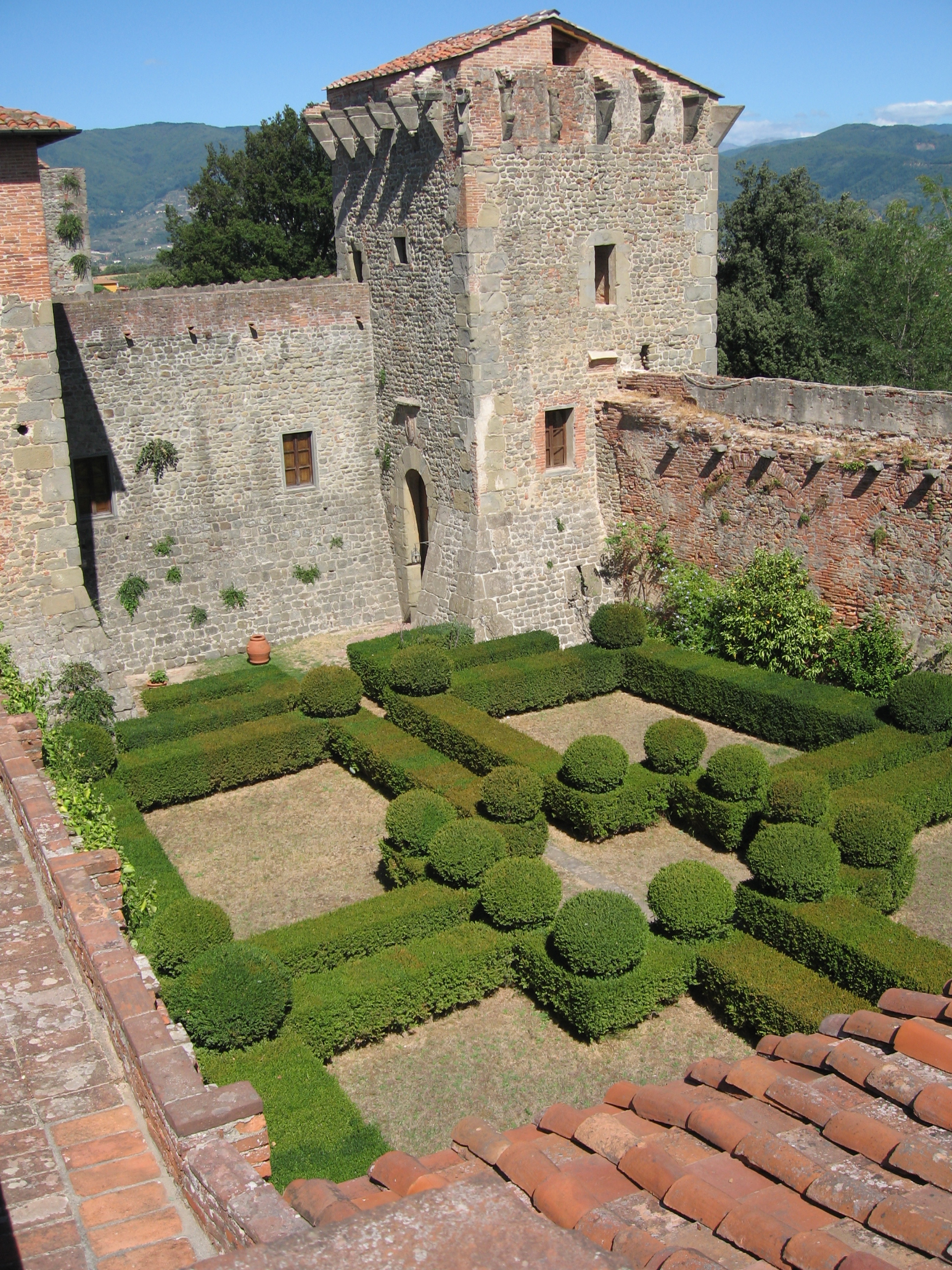
Castle (Rocca del Cerruglio) of Montecarlo.

Montecarlo is a comune (municipality) in the Province of Lucca in the Italian region Tuscany, located about 50 kilometres (31 mi) west of Florence and about 12 kilometres (7 mi) east of Lucca.

== History ==
Fort and village Montecarlo was founded in 1333 by future Bohemian king and Holy Roman Emperor Charles IV (Montecarlo in Italian means "Charles' Mountain"), who freed the nearby city of Lucca from the Pisan rule. A true settlement, however, appeared only after the Florentines destroyed the nearby castle of Vivinaia, and the authorities of the Republic of Lucca moved the population to the same hill of Charles' castle.

Montecarlo was a possession of the Republic of Florence from 1437.

== Main sights ==
- Sant'Andrea- Collegiate church first built in the 14th century, but much of the structure, including the interior, was refurbished in 1783. It is the tallest building in the village. The crypt retains the Romanesque architecture.
- San Piero in Campo- Pieve or rural parish church at the foot of Montecarlo's castle. The building, among the first mentioned in Early Medieval Lucchese documents, has one of the oldest bell towers in the whole diocese of Lucca. The church was completely rebuilt in the 12th century and again after the village was destroyed in the 14th century.
- Rocca del Cerruglio
- Teatro dei Rassicurati

== Sister cities ==
Montecarlo is twinned with:

- Karlštejn, Czech Republic, since 2002
- Althen-des-Paluds, France, since 2003
- Mylau, Germany, since 2006

== See also ==
- Montecarlo (wine)
- Battle of Altopascio
