= San Felice, Florence =

Roman Catholic church in Florence, Italy

Church of Saint Felix (Chiesa di San Felice in Piazza)
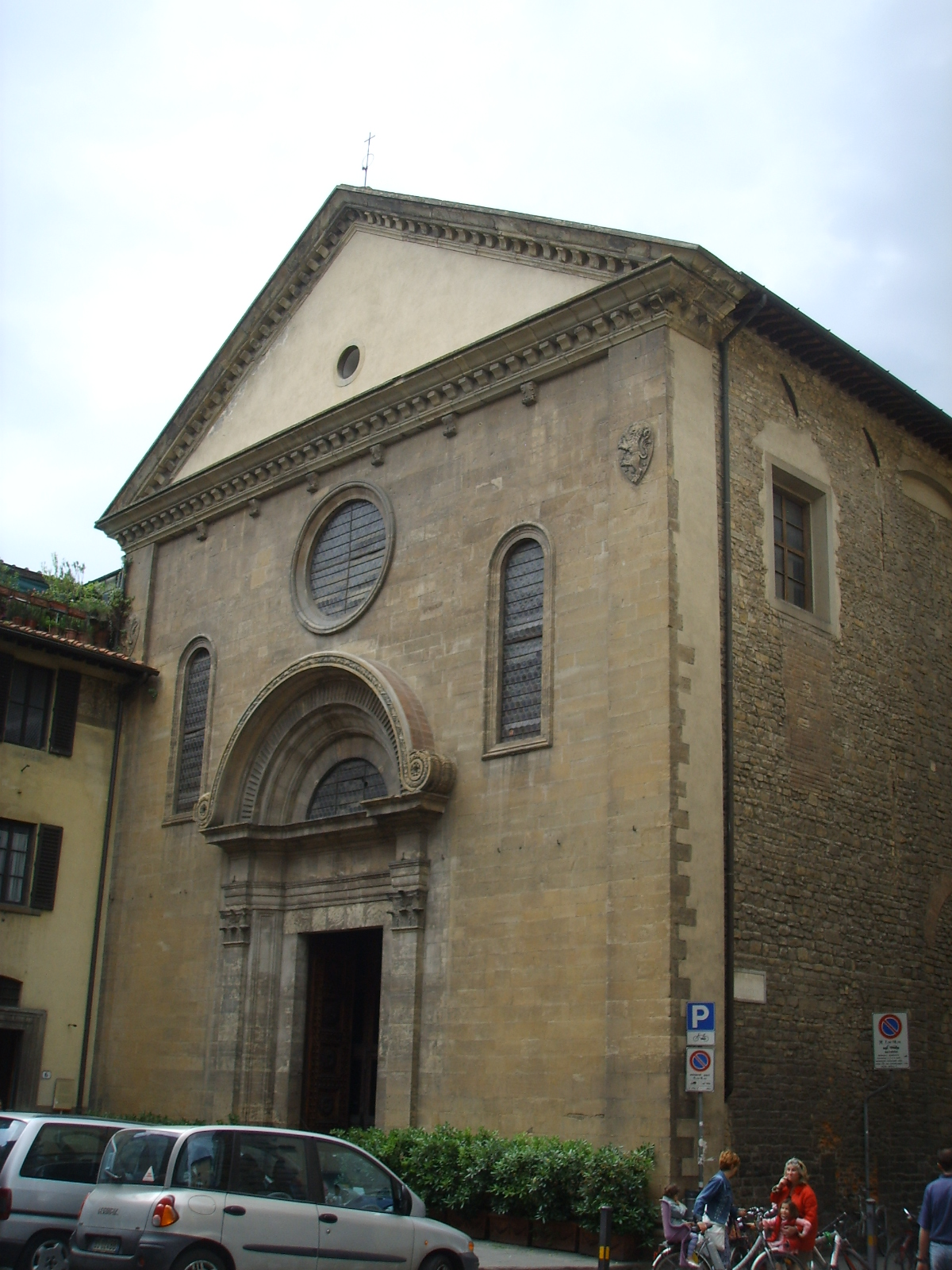
- Exterior from the Piazza San Felice.

Religion
- Affiliation: Roman Catholic
- Province: Florence

Location
- Location: Florence, Italy
- Interactive map of Church of Saint Felix (Chiesa di San Felice in Piazza)
- Coordinates: 43°45′54.18″N 11°14′51.37″E

Architecture
- Type: Church
- Style: Renaissance façade

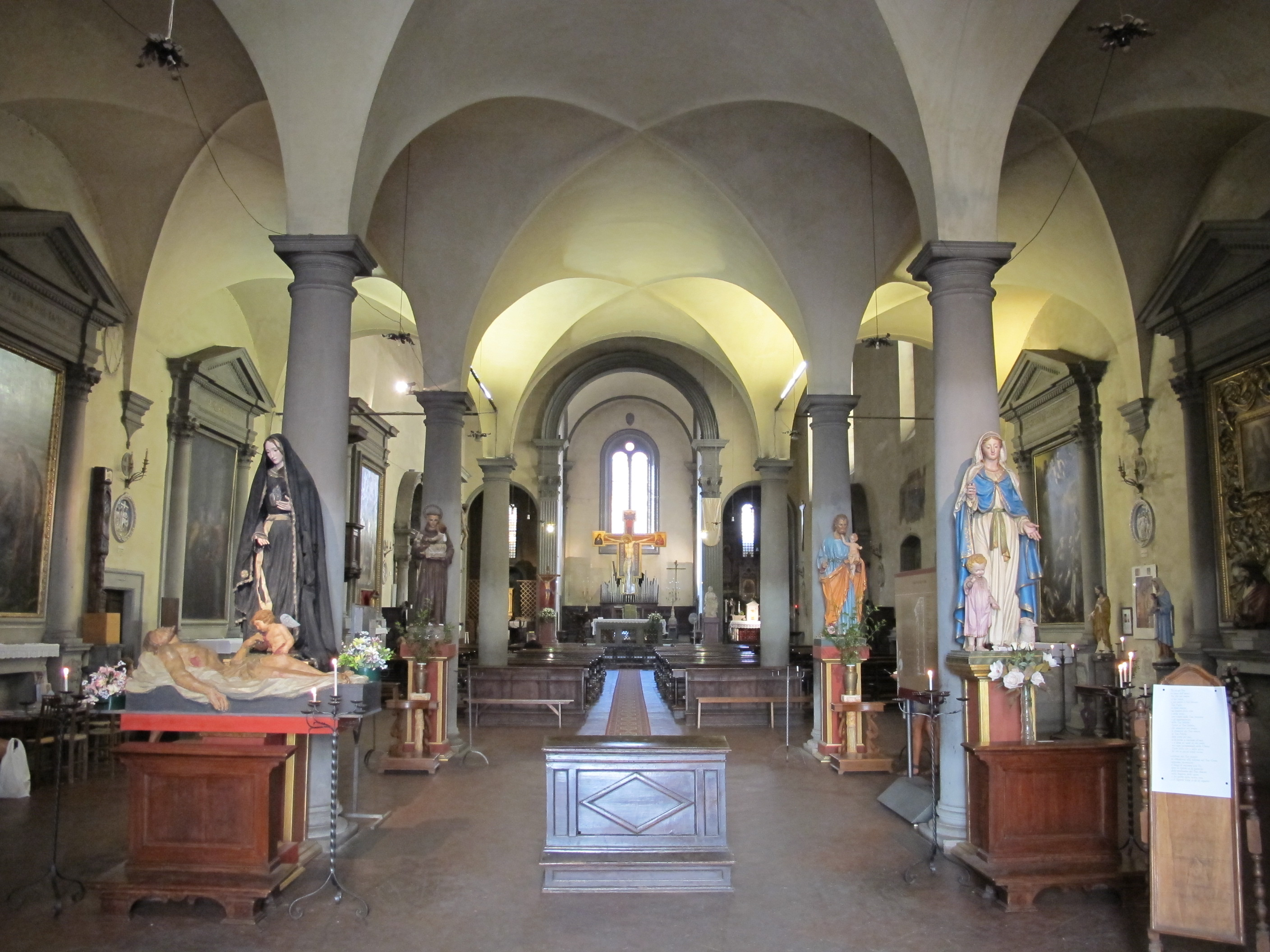
The interior

The Chiesa di San Felice (Church of St Felix) is a Roman Catholic church in Florence, region of Tuscany, Italy. It is located on the south bank of the River Arno, just west of the Pitti Palace. It is predominantly Gothic, but has a Renaissance façade by Michelozzo, added in 1457. Over the high altar is a large Crucifix attributed to Giotto or his school.

== History ==
A church at the site was built about the 10th-century outside one of the gates of early walls of Florence. It first belonged to the Monastery of San Silvestro of Nonantola, and in 1413 it was transferred to the Camaldolese Order. In 1552, it became property of the Dominican nuns of San Pietro Martire. The church provided a sanctuary to women fleeing from abusive husbands.

== Interior and artwork ==
The interior had a Madonna with Child and Saints by Ridolfo Ghirlandaio. Another chapel has a fresco by Giovanni da San Giovanni, depicting San Felice reviving St Massimo; the angels gathering the grapes in the painting are by Baldassare Franceschini. It had a triptych (1467) by Neri di Bicci, depicting St Augustin and St John Baptist, and St Julian and King St Sigismond. Another chapel had a Madonna and Child with St Hyacinth, by Jacopo da Empoli. The church has a Last Supper by Matteo Rosselli.

== Gallery ==
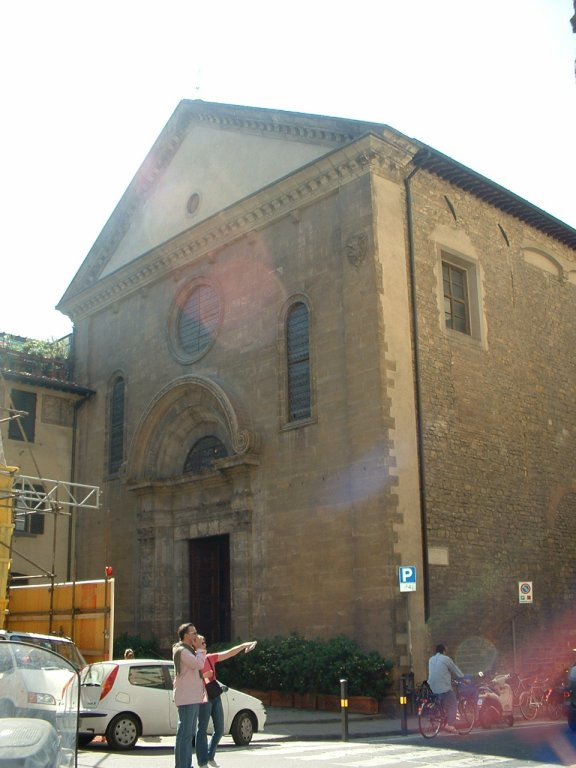
Exterior view of the church

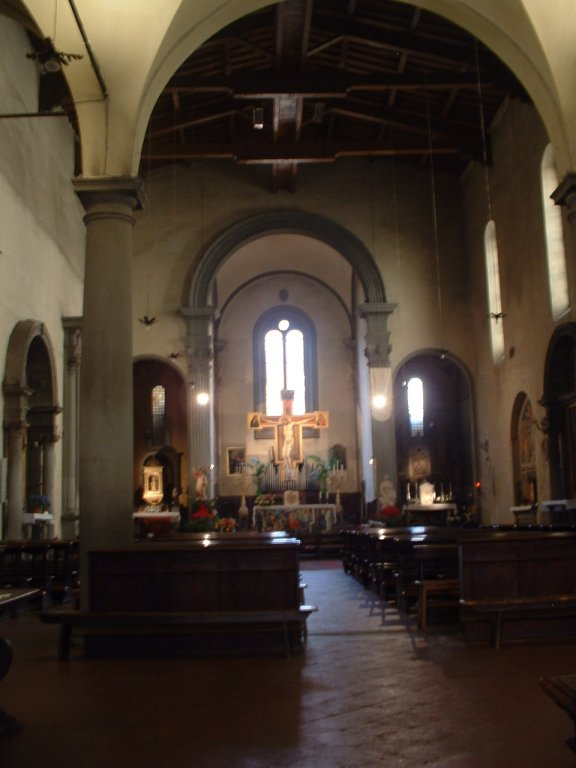
Interior view of the nave looking toward the apse

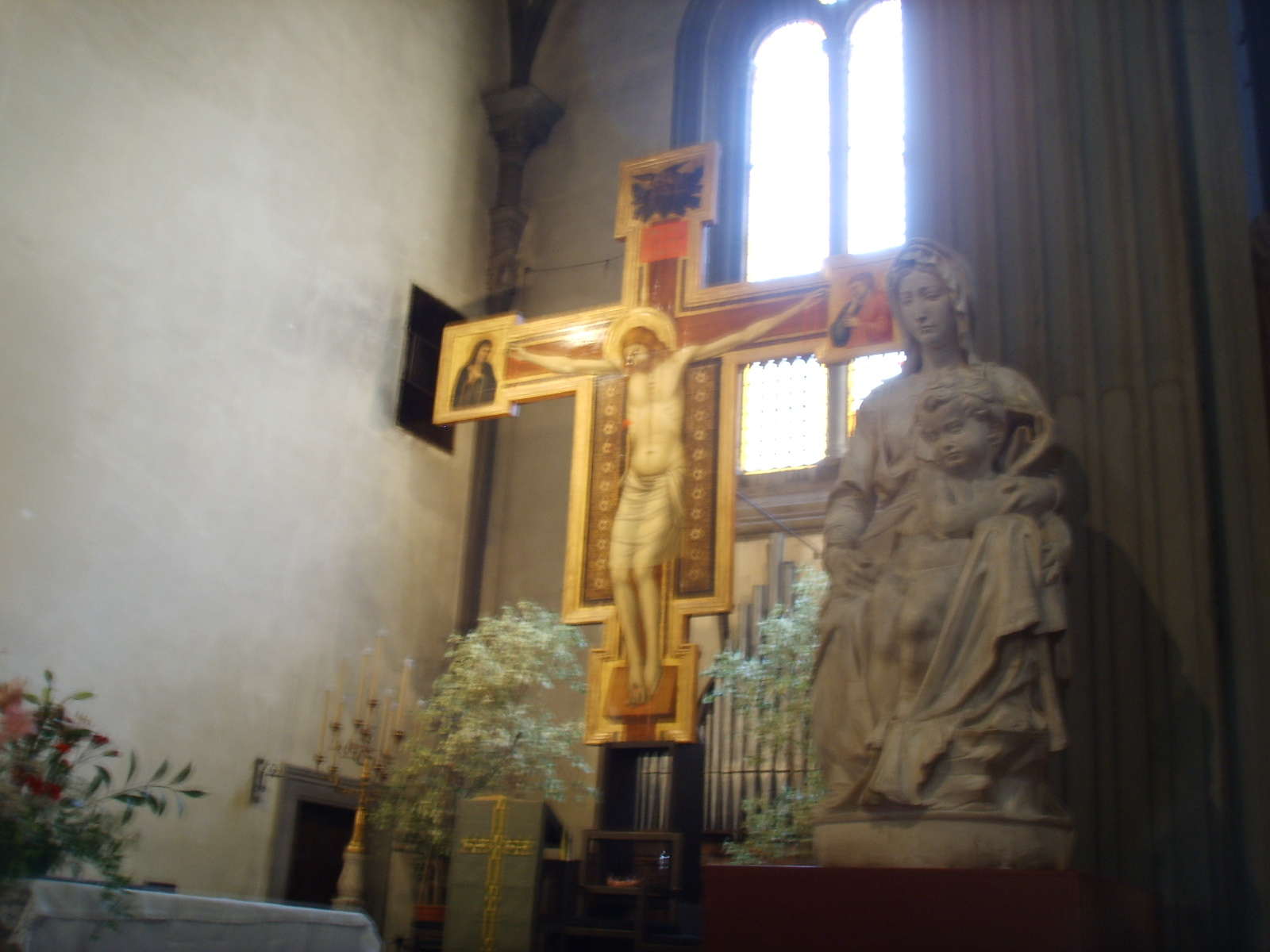
Madonna and the Crucifix inside.

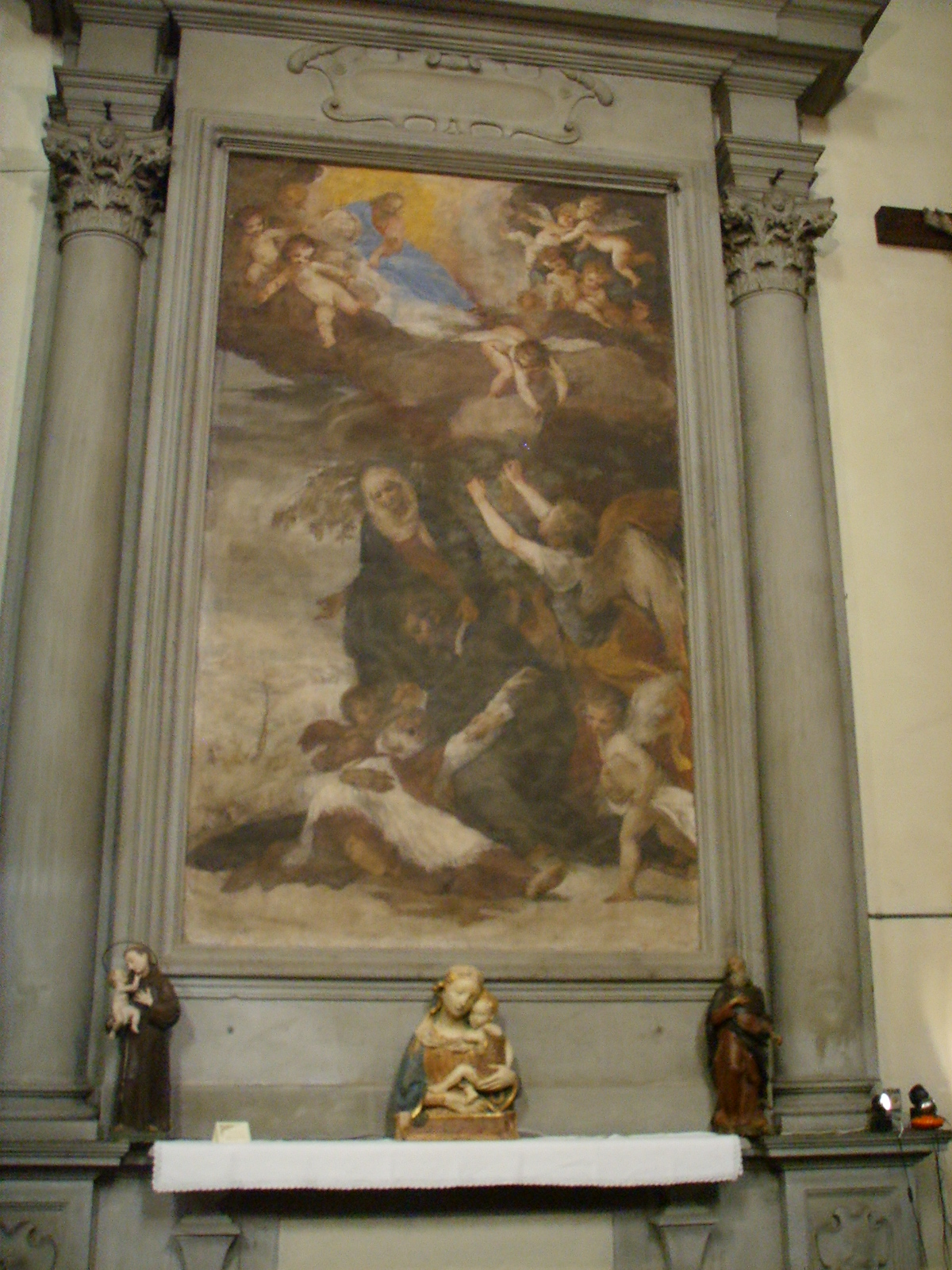
San Felice by Giovanni da San Giovanni and il Volterrano.
