= Sant'Alessandro a Giogoli =

Church building in Scandicci, Italy

Coordinates: 43°43′32.30″N 11°11′53.23″E

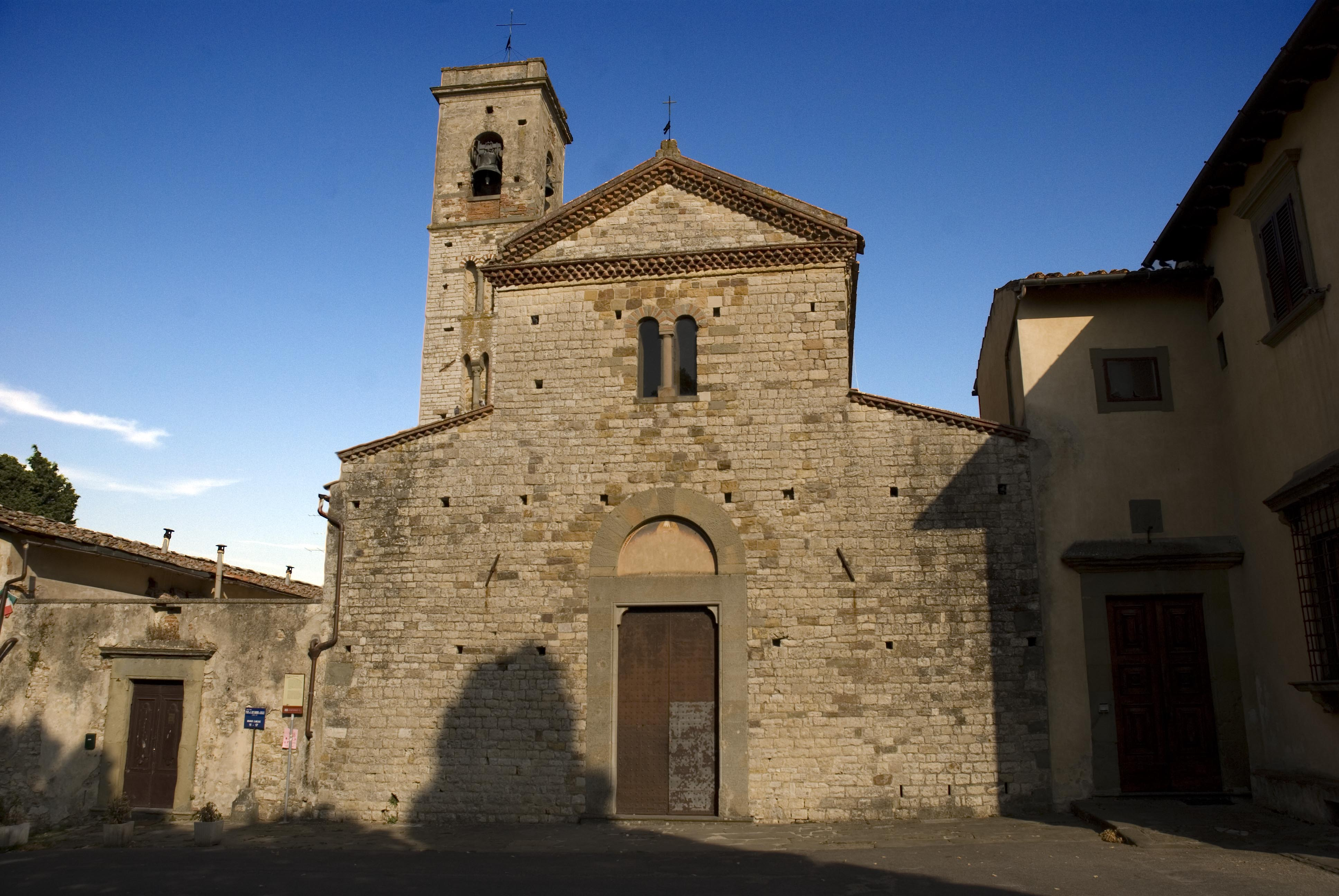
Facade

Sant'Alessandro a Giogoli is a Romanesque-style, Roman Catholic parish church located within the town limits of Scandicci in the province of the metropolitan city of Florence, region of Tuscany, Italy.

== History ==
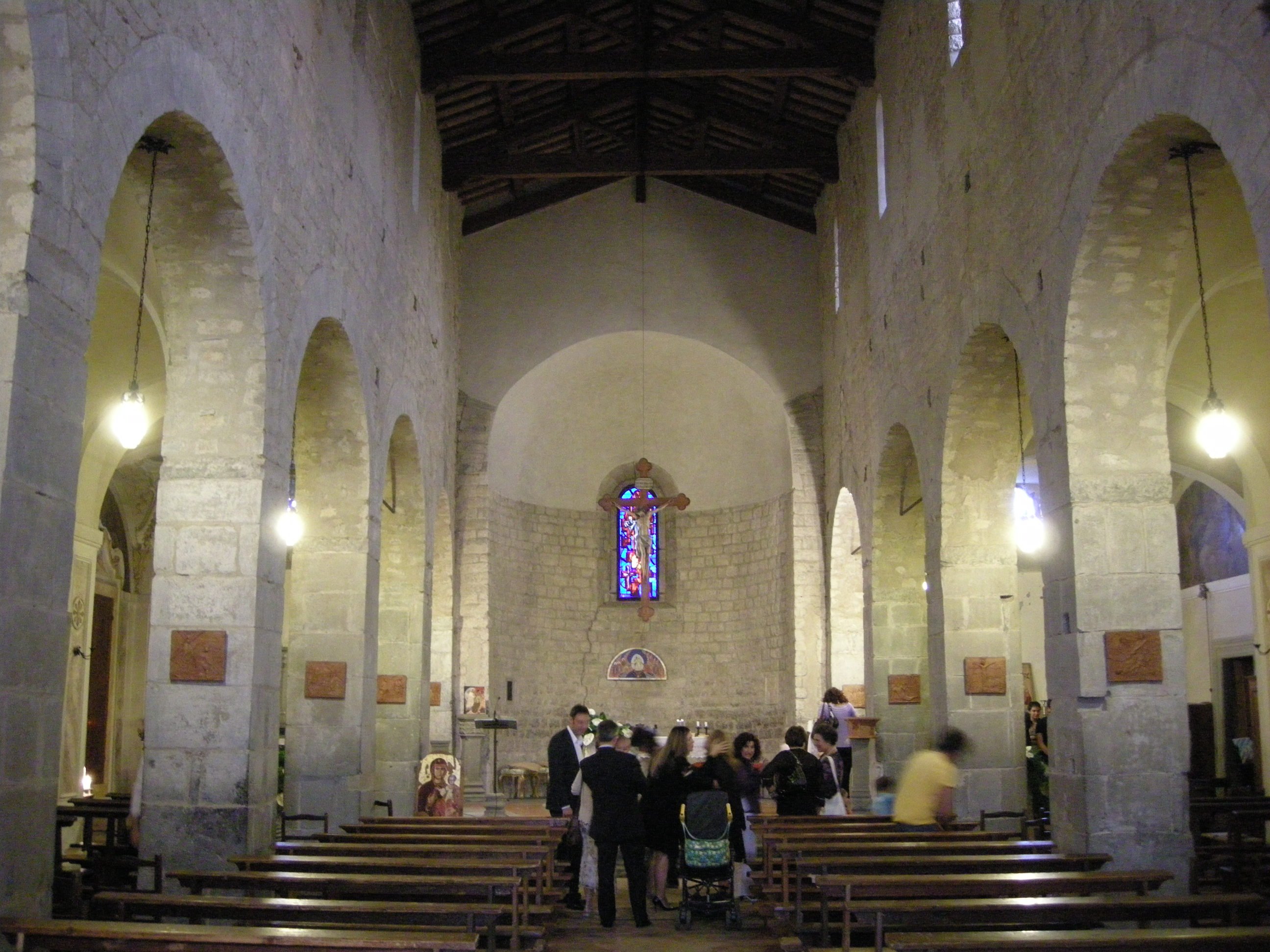
Nave

The name of the neighborhood Giogoli appears to be derived from gioghi or yokes, and may refer to the low hills of the region. A church at the site is mentioned by 10th-century; and a plaque in the adjacent cloister quoted a papal bull from 1187, wherein Pope Gregory VIII defined certain privileges granted to the church. The church was initially patronized by the Buondelmonti family. The Romanesque stone layout with a semi-circular apse underwent many reconstructions over the centuries, but is still maintained from the exterior. The facade has a small narrow mullioned window. Around 1712, the interior acquired a heavy Rococo decoration with stucco. Since the 19th century, much of the nave decoration has been stripped. During World War II, bombing caused the nave roof to collapse. Of the paintings from the 18th century, the counterfacade still has a depiction of the Samaritan at the Well and the Baptism of Christ by Pietro Pertichi; in the right transept is an Annunciation, a St Joseph and a St Francis of Assisi by Francesco Manetti.
