= Badia a Settimo =

Abbey in Scandicci, Italy

Coordinates: 43°46′49.64″N 11°08′41.13″E

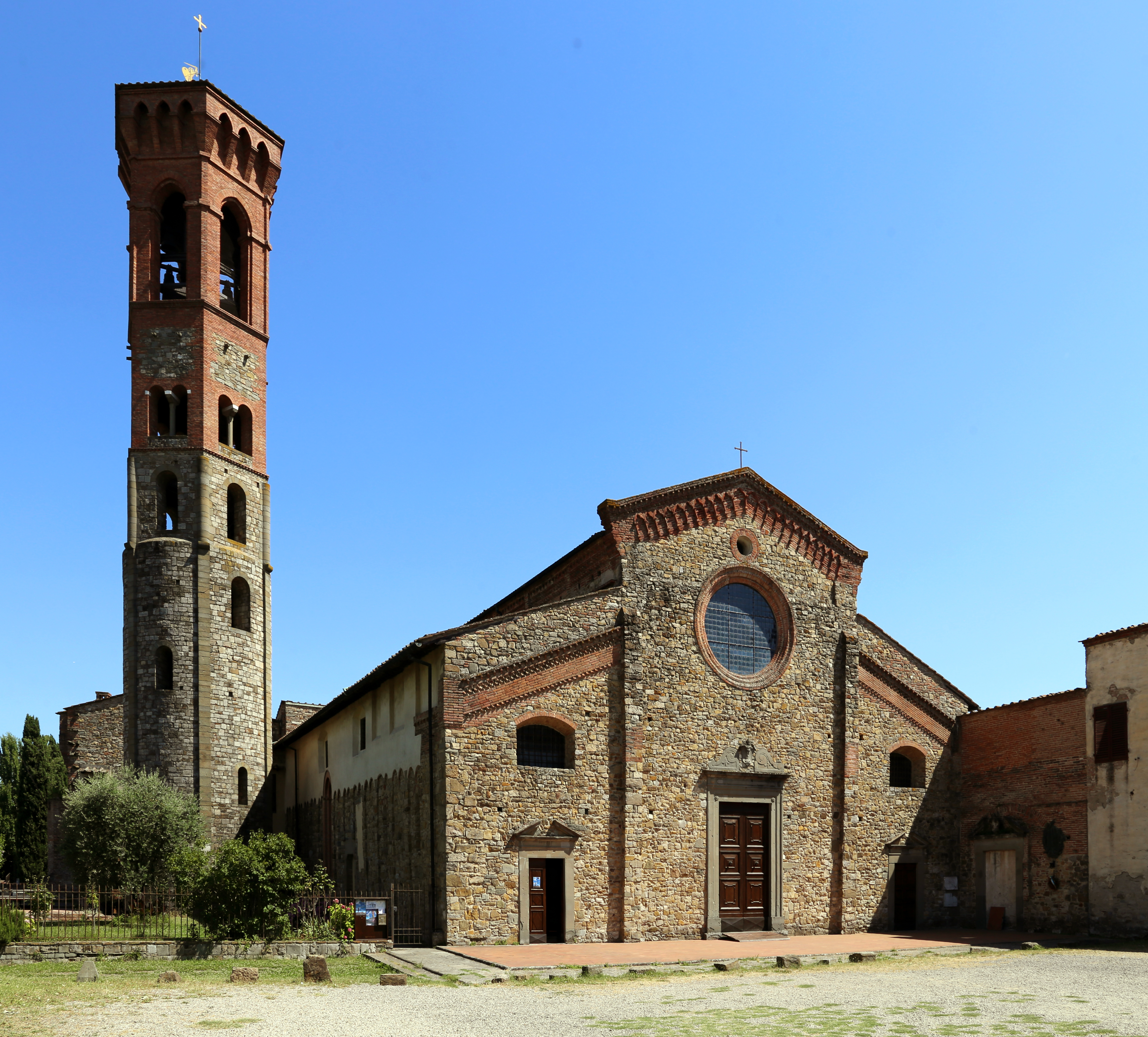
The Badia a Settimo

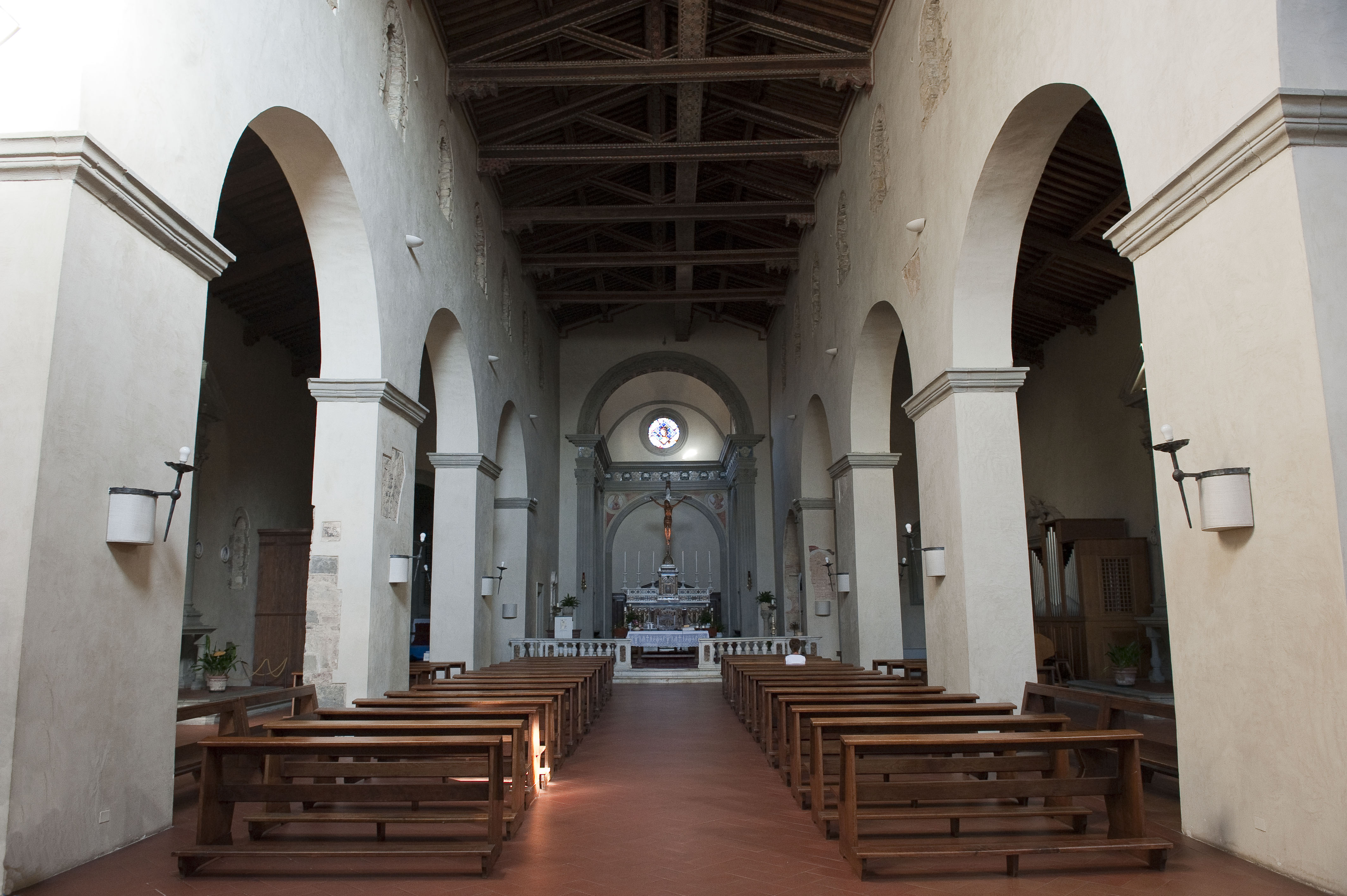
The nave

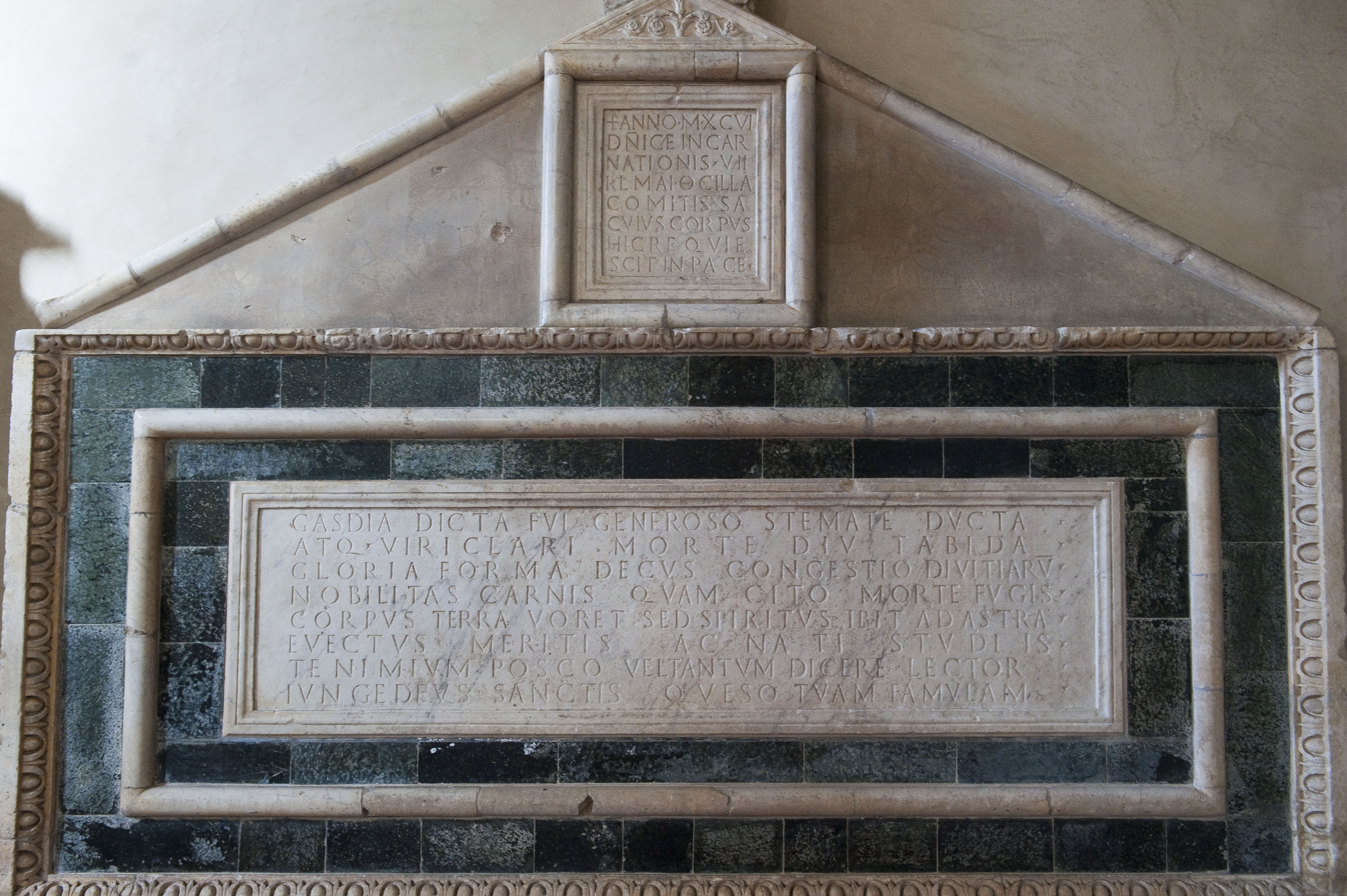
Crypt: the tomb of the countesses Cilla and Gasdia

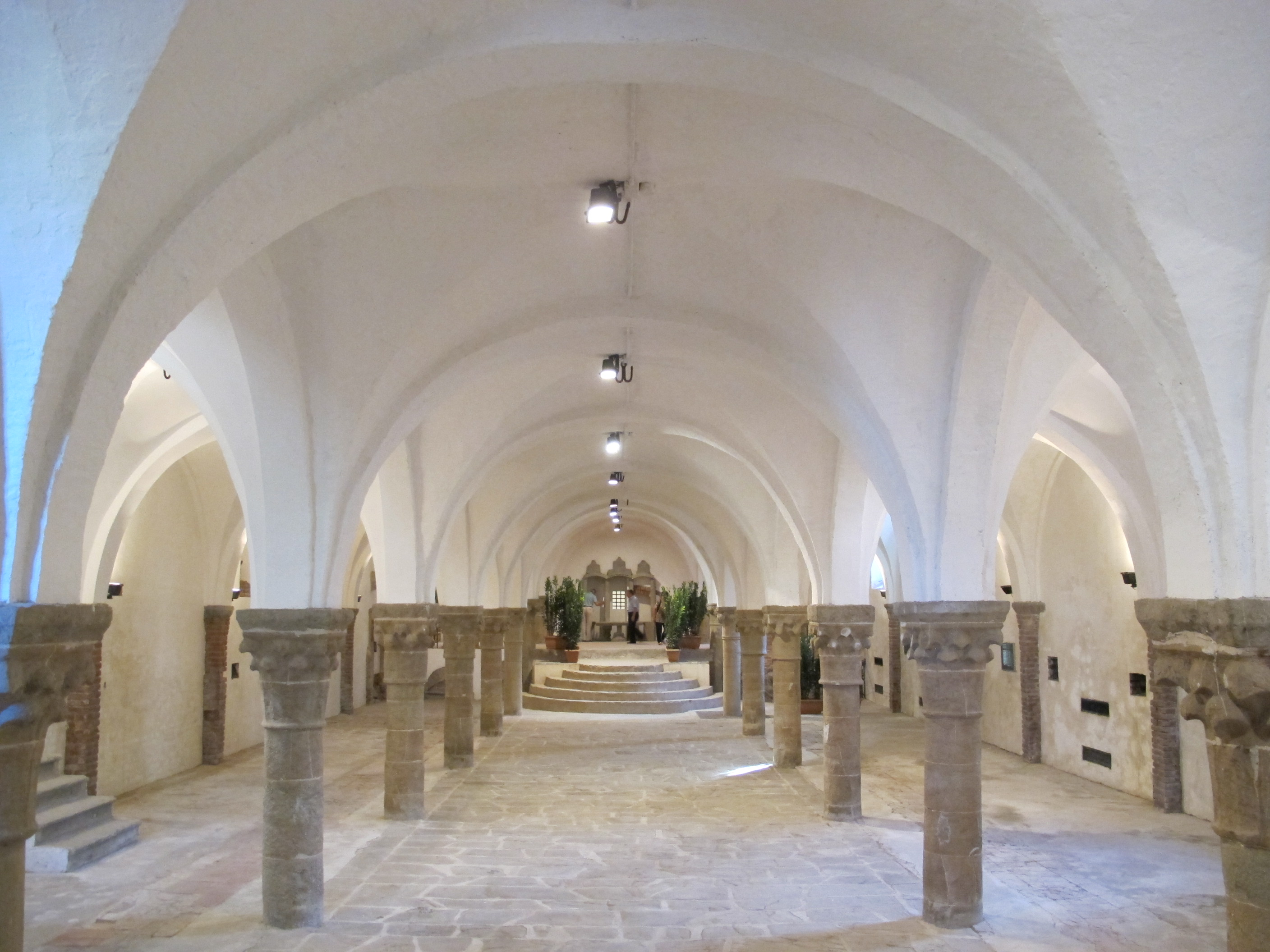
The granary

The Badia a Settimo or Abbazia dei Santi Salvatore e Lorenzo a Settimo is a Cluniac Benedictine abbey in the comune of Scandicci, near Florence in Tuscany, Italy. It was founded in 1004.

On 18 March 1236, by order of Pope Gregory IX, the monastery passed to the Cistercians of the abbey of Galgano Guidotti.

In the chapel of San Jacopo of the Badia, which dates to 1315, are frescoes, much ruined, that are the only surviving work attributed with reasonable certainty – by Ghiberti – to Buffalmacco, whose real name was Bonamico or Buonamico.

== See also ==
Abbot of Cluny
