= Jacopo Inghirami =

Italian admiral (1565–1624)

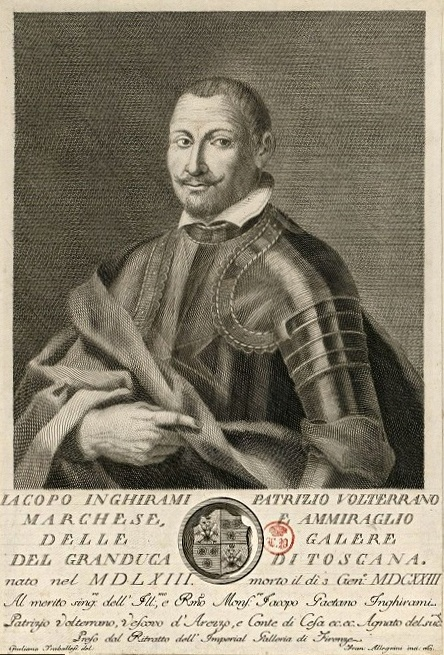
- Jacopo Inghirami (18th-century engraving from an earlier portrait)
- Born: July 1565; Volterra, Tuscany
- Died: 3 January 1624 (age 58); Volterra, Tuscany
- Military career
- Allegiance: Grand Duchy of Tuscany
- Branch: Navy
- Service years: 1581-1624
- Rank: Admiral
- Commands: Knights of Saint Stephen

Governor of Livorno
- In office 1617–1621

Jacopo (or Iacopo) Inghirami (July 1565 – 3 January 1624) was admiral of the Grand Duchy of Tuscany and marquis of Montevitozzo.

== Career ==
Born to an influential family in Volterra in July 1565, Jacopo was orphaned as a teenager. He was educated at the Palazzo della Carovana in Pisa and in 1581 joined the navy of the Knights of Saint Stephen - a militia created by Cosimo I de' Medici to fight the Ottoman Empire. Inghirami served on the order's galleys in the Mediterranean for some years before taking his first command. In the 1590s, he left the navy temporarily to fight for Philippe Emmanuel de Lorraine of the Catholic League during the religious wars in France. Upon his return to Tuscany, Inghirami rejoined the Tuscan navy, undertaking both military engagements and diplomatic missions for the Grand Duchy (such as that in 1600 when commanding the galley transporting the Grand Duke's daughter, Marie de' Medici, to marry Henry IV of France).

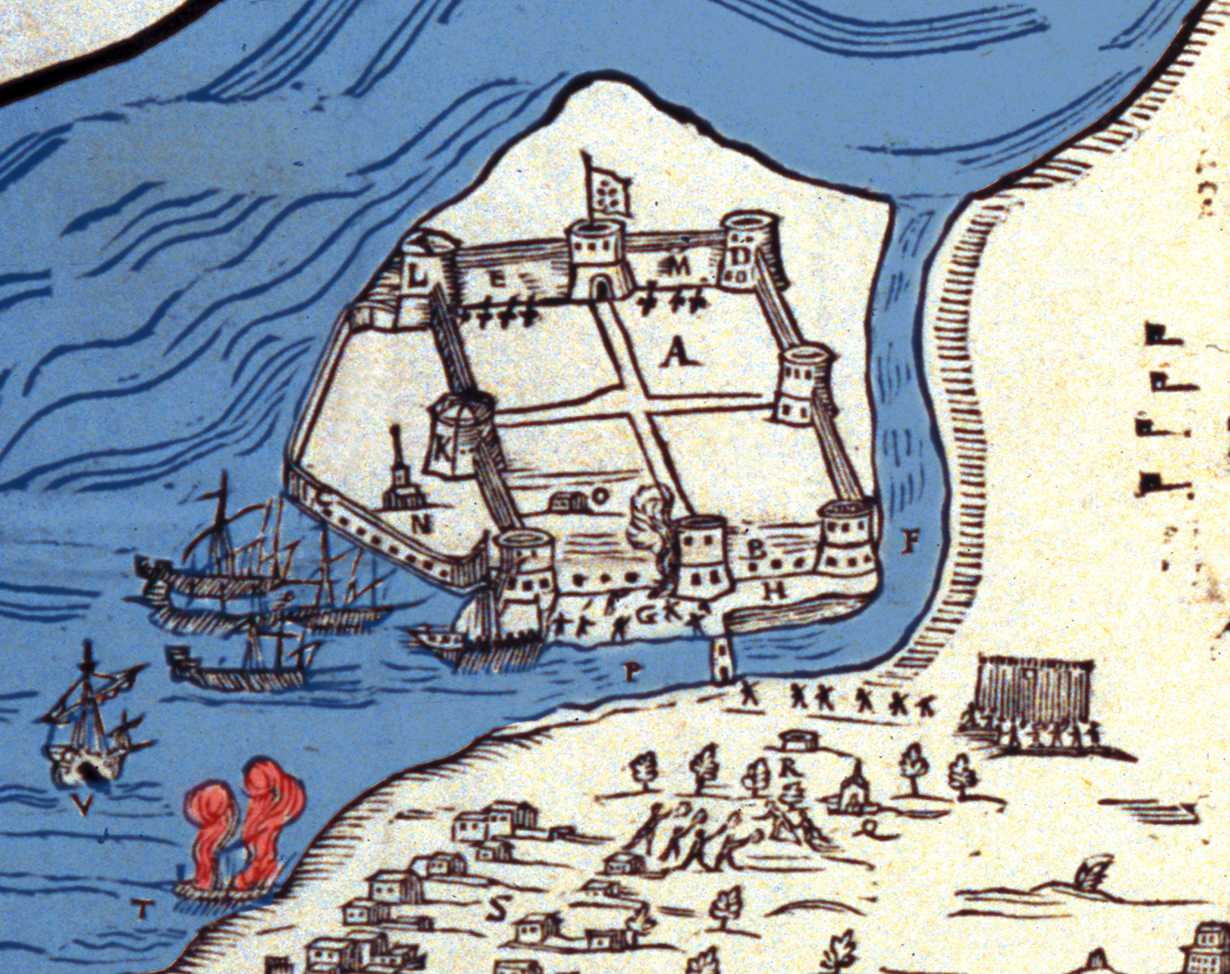
Inghirami's assault of Preveza in 1605.

In 1602, during the "Long War", he led a successful operation which resulted in a large number of Ottoman prisoners and the liberation of Christian captives. Following this action, he was appointed admiral of the fleet in 1603 by Ferdinando I de' Medici, Grand Duke of Tuscany.

For the coming decade, the Tuscan fleet (under Inghirami) engaged Ottoman shipping and Berber pirates in the Mediterranean. In 1603, commanding five Tuscan galleys, he defeated an Algerian-Tunisian flotilla commanded by corsair Amurat Reis near Sardinia, routing them with his superior artillery and capturing the Tunisian flagship.

Inghirami's successes also reached Turkish waters. He sacked the fortresses of Preveza in 1605 and Finike in 1606, and after a failure in invading Cyprus in 1607, they successfully took Bona (Annaba) in modern-day Algeria. He followed by raiding in Anatolia in 1612 and 1613.

As admiral, Inghirami also liaised with the Catholic allies of the Grand Duchy in the Mediterranean (including representatives of the fleets of France and later Spain), and also with the Medici family's North African allies (including emir Fakhr-al-Din II, whom Inghirmani carried to Messina, where he was received by Viceroy Pedro Téllez-Girón, Duke of Osuna, during the emir's exile from Lebanon).

In May 1616, Inghirami sailed with five galleys until Negroponte, where he captured the flagship of Mytilene and a ship carrying rich tribute from Alexandria. Upon his return, he defeated Amurat Reis and his six Algerian galleys again near Castelrosso. The same year, Cosimo II de' Medici awarded Inghirami the title of Marquis, and later appointed him Governor of Livorno. He remained governor until 1621 when he assumed command of the fleet again. He held this position until his death in Volterra on 3 January 1624. He is buried in the Chapel of St. Paul in the Cathedral of Volterra (the chapel had been commissioned by Inghirami himself in 1605).

== Patronage ==
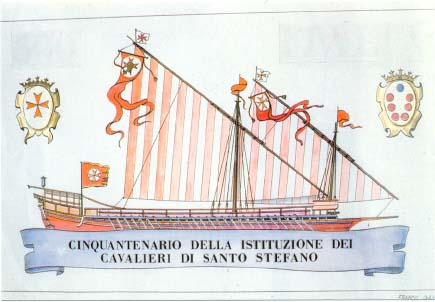
Galley of the Knights of St. Stephen (17th or 18th-century drawing)

When not at sea, Inghirami maintained the family seat at the Palazzo Inghirami in Volterra, the façade of which was designed by Gherardo Silvani. Inghirami also commissioned a villa by Silvani on Inghirami lands outside Volterra at Ulignano.

One of Inghirami's larger commissions was the Inghirami family chapel in the Duomo (cathedral) of Volterra. This chapel (dedicated to Saint Paul) was designed by Alessandro Pieroni and includes frescos by Giovanni da San Giovanni.

Giambologna and Pietro Tacca's equestrian statue of Ferdinando I de' Medici (in the Piazza Santissima Annunziata in Florence) is made from the recast bronze of cannon captured by Inghirami's galleons.
