= Santa Maria degli Angiolini =

Renaissance church

Coordinates: 43.7755°N 11.2636°E

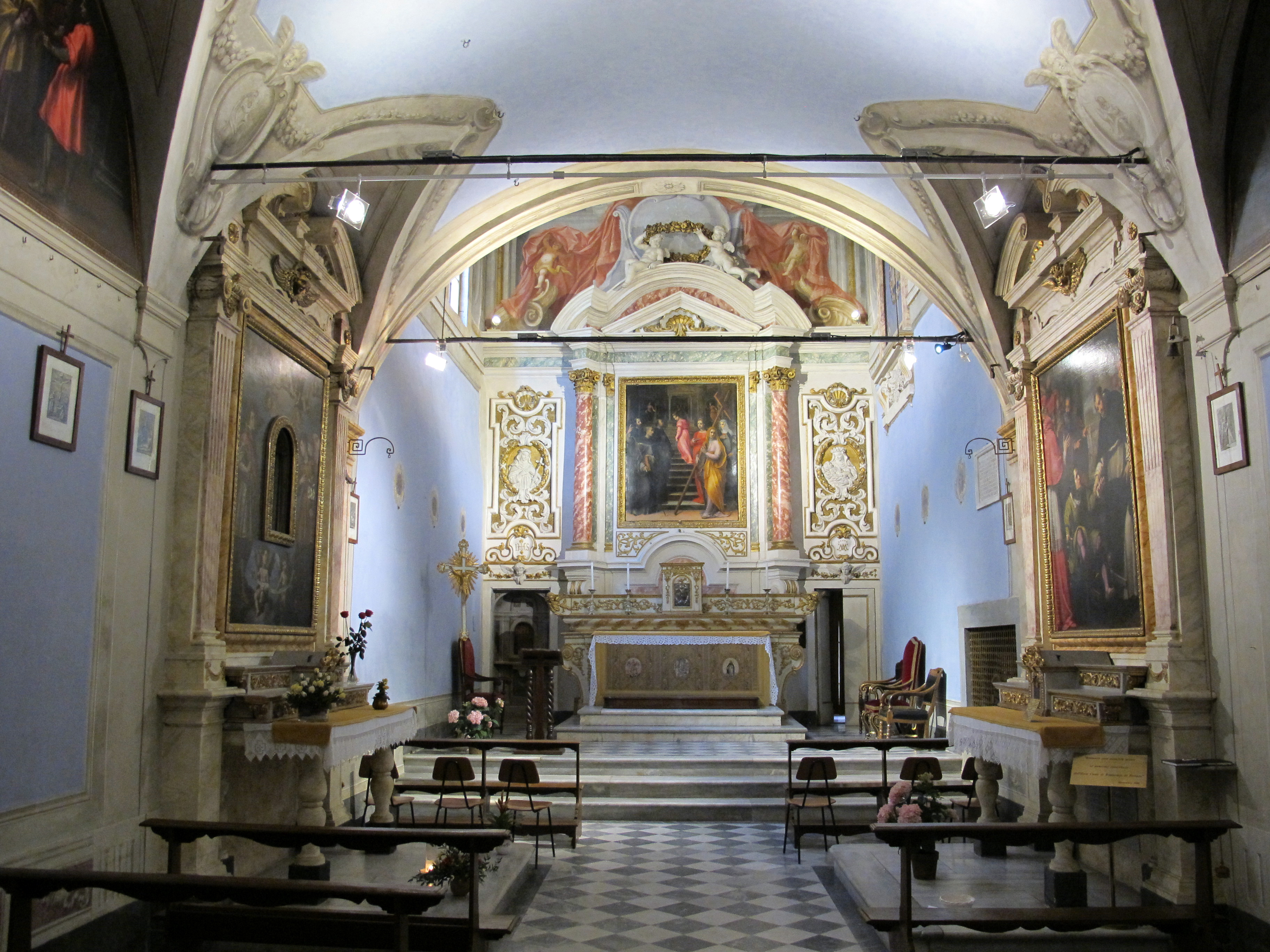
The church of Santa Maria degli Angiolini, interior

Santa Maria degli Angiolini, also known as the Cappella degli Angioli, is a Renaissance-style, Roman Catholic church, located on Via della Colonna #34, Florence, Italy, now serving as a school and dormitory.

In 1502, a half-dozen Florentine women retired to a nearby house bought for them by a wool merchant named Dionisio di Clemente. In 1509 the community took up Dominican orders, and they built a convent and this church at the site.

During the sixteenth century, the convent was enlarged to cope with the increasing number of nuns (totaling 102 in 1561). In 1785, as part of the reform of the established religious promoted by Grand Duke of Tuscany, Peter Leopold, the convent was transformed into a school. Suppressed in 1808, it was later restored and, at present, still functions as a school. Part of the monastery is used as a dormitory.

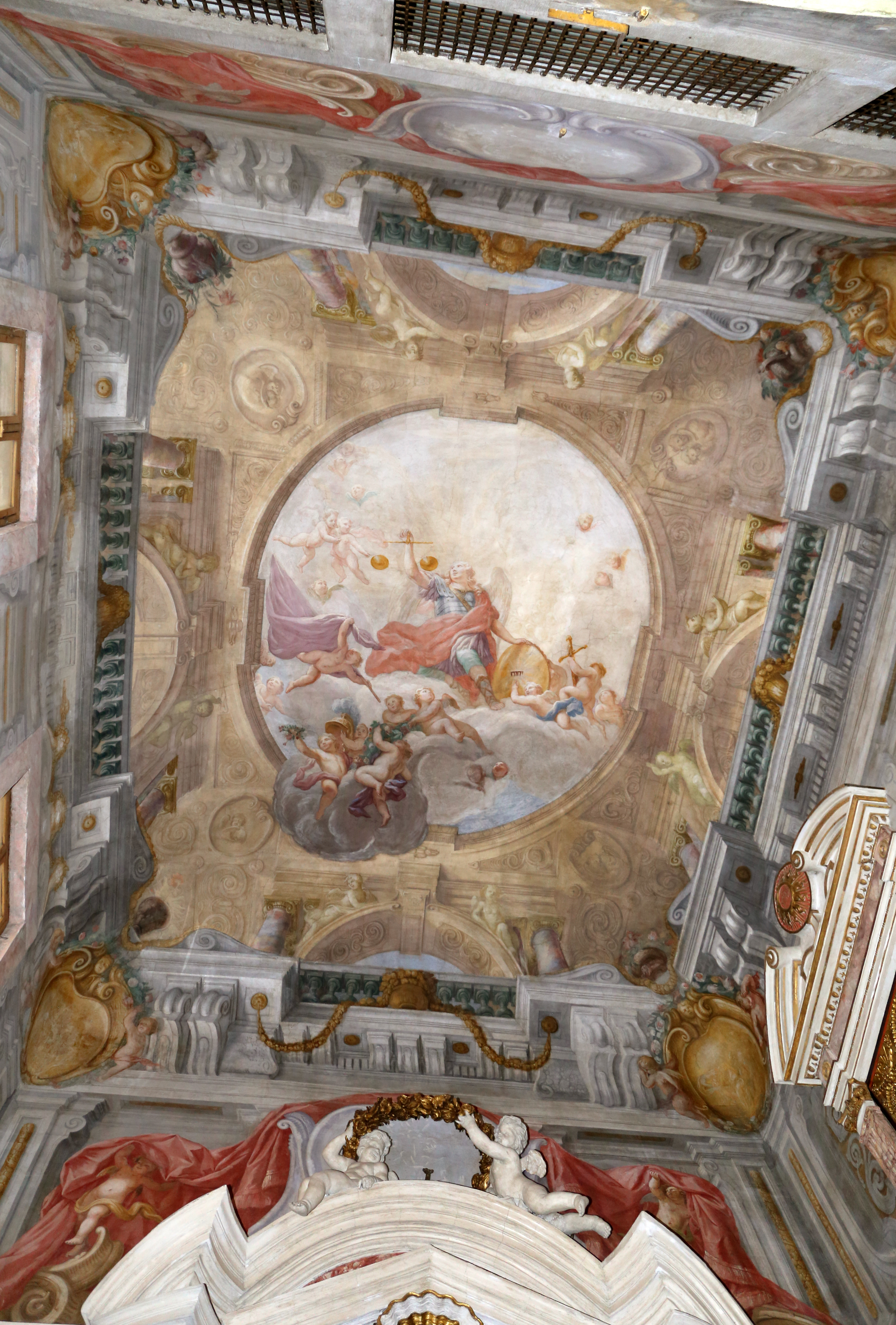
Ceiling of Santa Maria degli Angiolini, Florence.

The church had a Archangels Michele and Gabriello by Francesco Curradi and a Miracle by St Dominic by Matteo Rosselli. The main altarpiece, by Domenico Puligo, has been interpreted as a Presentation of the Virgin at the Temple (1526-1527), but may symbolize the entry of girls into the nunnery, since at the front of the picture are Dominican Saints Antonino Pierozzi, Thomas Aquinas, and Vincent Ferrer on one side and St Helena, Catherine, and Lucy on the other.

The ceiling fresco was painted by Giovanni Maria Ciocchi. The refectory has a large fresco of The Last Supper by Rosselli. In the Gallery is a bronze San Giovanni Battista by Giambologna.

The church and convent are accessible only by reservation.
