= Francesco Curradi =

Italian painter (1570–1661)

- Altarpiece of the Church of San Giovannino degli Scolopi, Florence
- Born: 15 novembre 1570; Florence, Grand Duchy of Tuscany
- Died: 1661; Florence, Grand Duchy of Tuscany
- Education: Giovanni Battista Naldini
- Known for: Painting
- Movement: Counter-Mannerism

Francesco Curradi or Currado (15 November 1570 – 1661) was an Italian Counter-Maniera painter, born and active in Florence.

== Biography ==
Curradi was born in Florence on 15 November 1570, to the sculptor Taddeo di Francesco – known as Battiloro – and his wife Stella Ghini. He trained under Giovanni Battista Naldini and in 1590 matriculated in the Accademia del Disegno, Florence. Between 1594 and 1603, he contributed to the decoration of the Serragli Chapel in the Church of San Marco, a major decorative project involving leading Tuscan painters such as Jacopo da Empoli, Giovanni Biliverti, and Bernardino Poccetti.

From 1597 to 1598, Curradi created his first independent work: the decoration of the Colleoni Chapel in Volterra Cathedral. In 1609, he painted the Last Supper for the refectory of the convent of San Barnaba, Florence. In 1611, he painted a Crucifixion for the Augustinian church of Sant'Agostino, Volterra. The same date is also inscribed on a Portrait of a Young Man (Staatsgalerie Stuttgart). The portrait is posthumous, as indicated by the young man's gaze directed towards the heavens and his raised left hand, which convey melancholy and resignation to fate. Separated from the viewer by a table on which a human skull rests, the man indicates the skull with his right hand, drawing attention to its significance as a symbol of the transience of human life.

From June 1616 to October 1617 Curradi participated in the decoration of the Casa Buonarroti, Florence, to which he contributed a canvas showing Fame Raising Michelangelo above other Painters. In 1622 he executed a major work, distinguished by new vigour and enriched by lively figures: the St. Francis Xavier Preaching to the Indians (Florence, San Giovannino degli Scolopi). In the same year, he fulfilled a commission from Cardinal Carlo de' Medici for a Narcissus at the Spring (Florence, Palazzo Pitti), a lyrical and melancholy work that was probably intended, along with Erminia among the Shepherds (Villa La Petraia, near Florence), for the Casino Mediceo di San Marco. His newly dramatic art, with bolder chiaroscuro and a diagonally based composition, culminated in the Beheading of St. Paul (c. 1627; Volterra Cathedral).

Lunette in the Church of Santa Maria a Novoli, Florence, depicting Sts. Dominic, Catherine of Alexandria, and Philip Neri

In 1632 Curradi painted a series of lunettes on canvas depicting scenes from the Life of St. Mary Magdalene for the Medici Villa del Poggio Imperiale (Florence, Uffizi), and possibly soon after executed another cycle of scenes from the Life of the Virgin (Florence, Santa Maria degli Angiolini). For his St. Mary Magdalene de' Pazzi Receiving a Veil from the Virgin (1633; Rome, San Giovanni dei Fiorentini) he received the title of Knight of the Supreme Order of Christ.

Curradi’s late works, despite the warm Florentine reception accorded to the new art of Pietro da Cortona at this date, show little stylistic development, although his colour is perhaps more severe and his draughtsmanship more simplified. In 1646 he painted the Crowning of the Virgin for the Benedictine Vallombrosa Abbey in Reggello, near Florence. In 1649 he executed for the Rondoni chapel in the church of Santa Trinita, Florence, the altarpiece St. John the Baptist Preaching. An inscription, probably not in his own hand, asserts his authorship of a Landscape with Figures (Louisville, KY, W. Hughes priv. col.) and the date 1658 , which is the latest found on any painting attributed to him. Curradi died in Florence in 1661. The most important of Corradi's pupils was Cesare Dandini.

As one of the leading exponents of early Baroque devotional painting in Florence alongside Matteo Rosselli, Curradi bridged the gap between late Mannerism and the naturalism of the 17th century. His deeply spiritual, restrained style, marked by meticulous draftsmanship, warm palettes and soft chiaroscuro, had a significant impact on Florentine Baroque painters, particularly Jacopo Vignali and Carlo Dolci.

== Gallery ==
St. Lawrence

Vision of St. Philip Benizi de Damiani

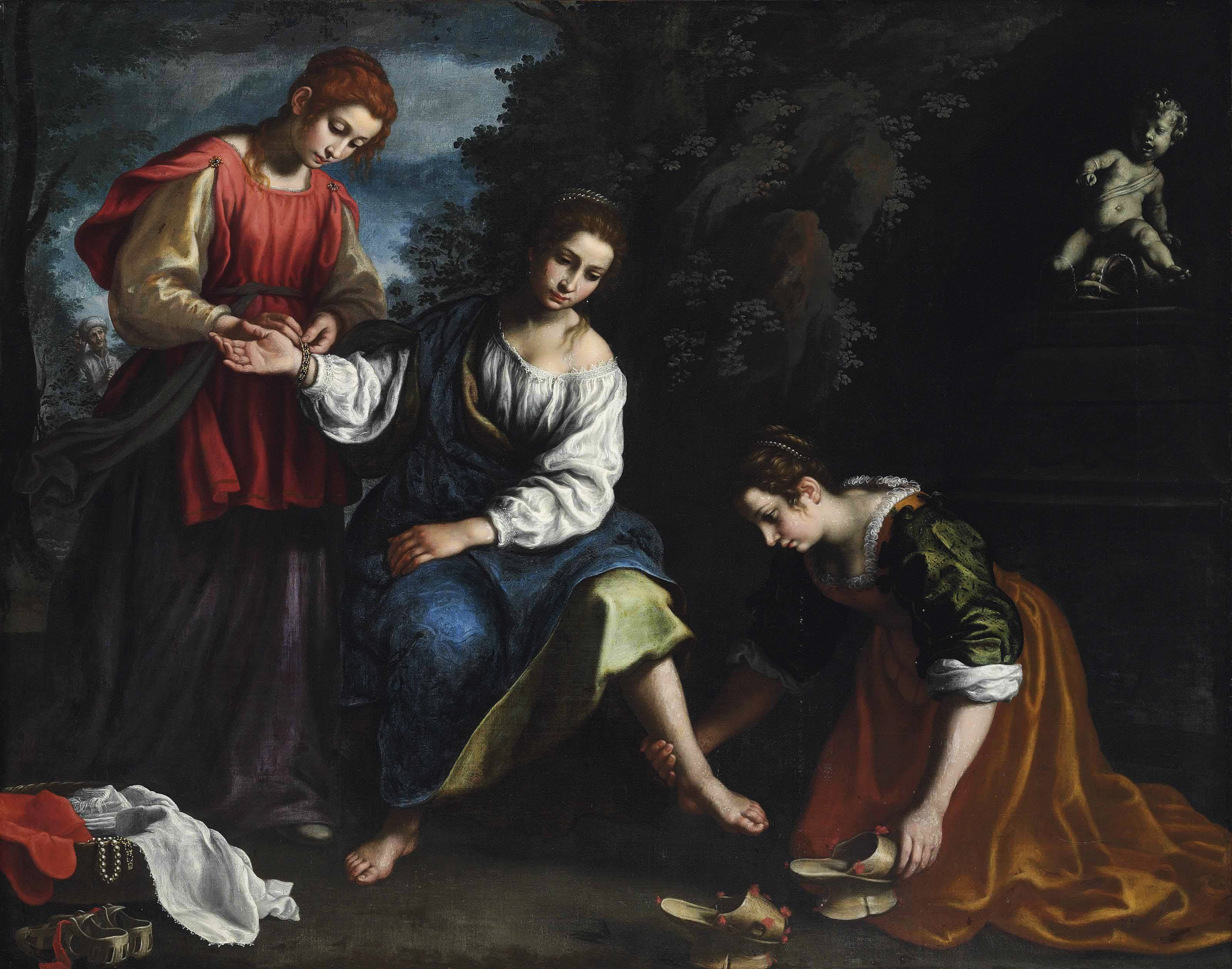
Bathsheba at Her Bath

St. Peter opening the gates of Paradise

Circumcision of Christ

St. Margareth

The Penitent Magdalene

St. Catherine of Alexandria

== Bibliography ==
- Farquhar, Maria (1855). Ralph Nicholson Wornum (ed.). Biographical catalogue of the principal Italian painters. London: Woodfall & Kinder. p. 53.
- Trezzani, Ludovica (1985). "CURRADI, Francesco". Dizionario Biografico degli Italiani (in Italian). Vol. 31: Cristaldi–Dalla Nave. Rome: Institute of the Italian Encyclopaedia. ISBN 978-88-12-00032-6.
- Santi, Bruno (2003). "Curradi, Francesco". Grove Art Online. Oxford: Oxford University Press. doi:10.1093/oao/9781884446054.013.90000369656.
