= Order of St. Stephen =

Order of St. Stephen may refer to:

- Holy Military Order of Saint Stephen Pope and Martyr, founded in 1561 by grand duke Cosimo I of Tuscany
- The Royal Hungarian Order of Saint Stephen, founded in 1764 by queen Maria Theresa of Hungary
