= Chios expedition (1599) =

Tuscan campaign in Chios, late 16th century

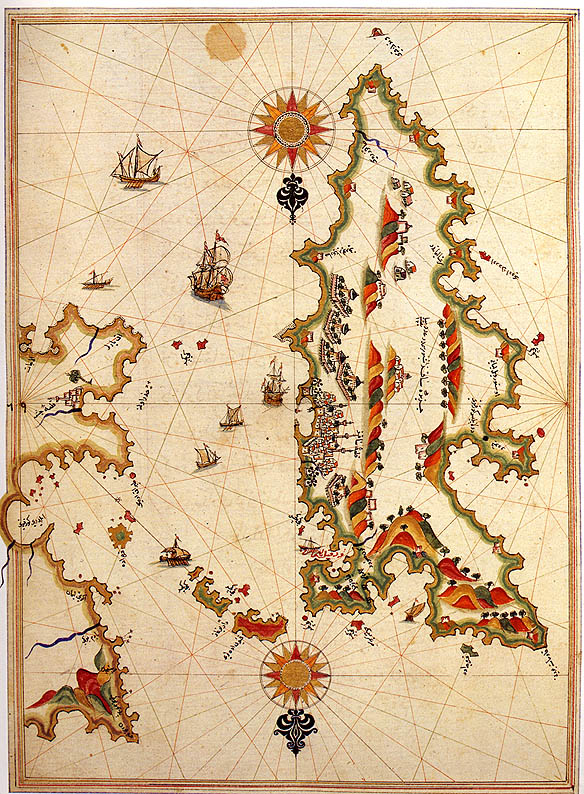
- Ottoman drawing of Chios island
Date	5 May 1599
Location	Chios, Aegean Sea
Result	Ottoman victory

Belligerents
Grand Duchy of Tuscany; Knights of St. Stephen	Ottoman Empire

Commanders and leaders
(Tuscany) Virginius Orsini (Tuscany) Bartolomeo Barbolani de Montauto †; Marc Antonio Calefati	Unknown

Strength
2,000 men 5 ships	10,000 men

Casualties and losses
400 killed	2 Galleys lost

In 1599, the Florentines launched an expedition against the Ottoman-held island of Chios. The expedition ended in disaster for the Florentine forces.

== Background ==
In 1566, the Ottoman admiral Piali Pasha conquered the island of Chios. The Ottomans allowed the Giustiniani to retain their possessions on the island; having been inspired by the Knights Hospitaller, the florentines sent a fleet to keep the sea clear of Ottoman privateers and ensure the safety of Christian shipping; this duty was given to the Knights of St. Stephen, who grossly abused their trust and began seizing ships, claiming they originally belonged to the Turks.

== Expedition ==
In 1599, the Florentines organized an expedition of 2,000 men and five ships. They were led by Virginius Orsini, Duke of Brassno, Colonel Bartolomeo Montauto, and Marc Antonio Calefati, knight of St. Stephan, who commanded the expedition. They arrived in Chios on May 5. During the night. 400 men, led by Bartolomeo, landed ashore. They scaled the city with ladders, surprised the Ottoman guards, and killed them. They opened the gates for the other Florentines and seized a gun that protected the harbor. The Ottomans shut themselves in the fort. The Florentines implanted their flag over the city.

The Florentines entered the town disorderly and began looting houses belonging to Christians. Having become outraged by their actions, the native Christians joined the Ottomans and, together with a force of 10,000 men, surrounded them. The Florentines were divided into two groups, one to reach the harbor for safety. They began escaping, but a bombardment from the fort forced the ships to retreat, leaving the Florentines surrounded and all killed.

The other group, however, took refuge in the houses and defended themselves for some hours, but seeing they could not resist longer, they offered to surrender, but the Ottomans refused, setting fire to the houses and killing all inside. Despite such failure, the Florentines succeeded in capturing two galleys in the harbor.
