= Francesco Cungi =

Italian painter

Francesco di Cungi was an Italian painter, born in 1560 in Sansepolcro, and active at least until 1590s, when he painted a Martyrdom of St Sebastian for the Volterra Cathedral. He is said to have been a member of the Accademia del disegno of Florence during 1596–97.
