= Volterra Cathedral =

Roman Catholic cathedral in Volterra, Italy

Coordinates: 43°24′06.45″N 10°51′31.15″E

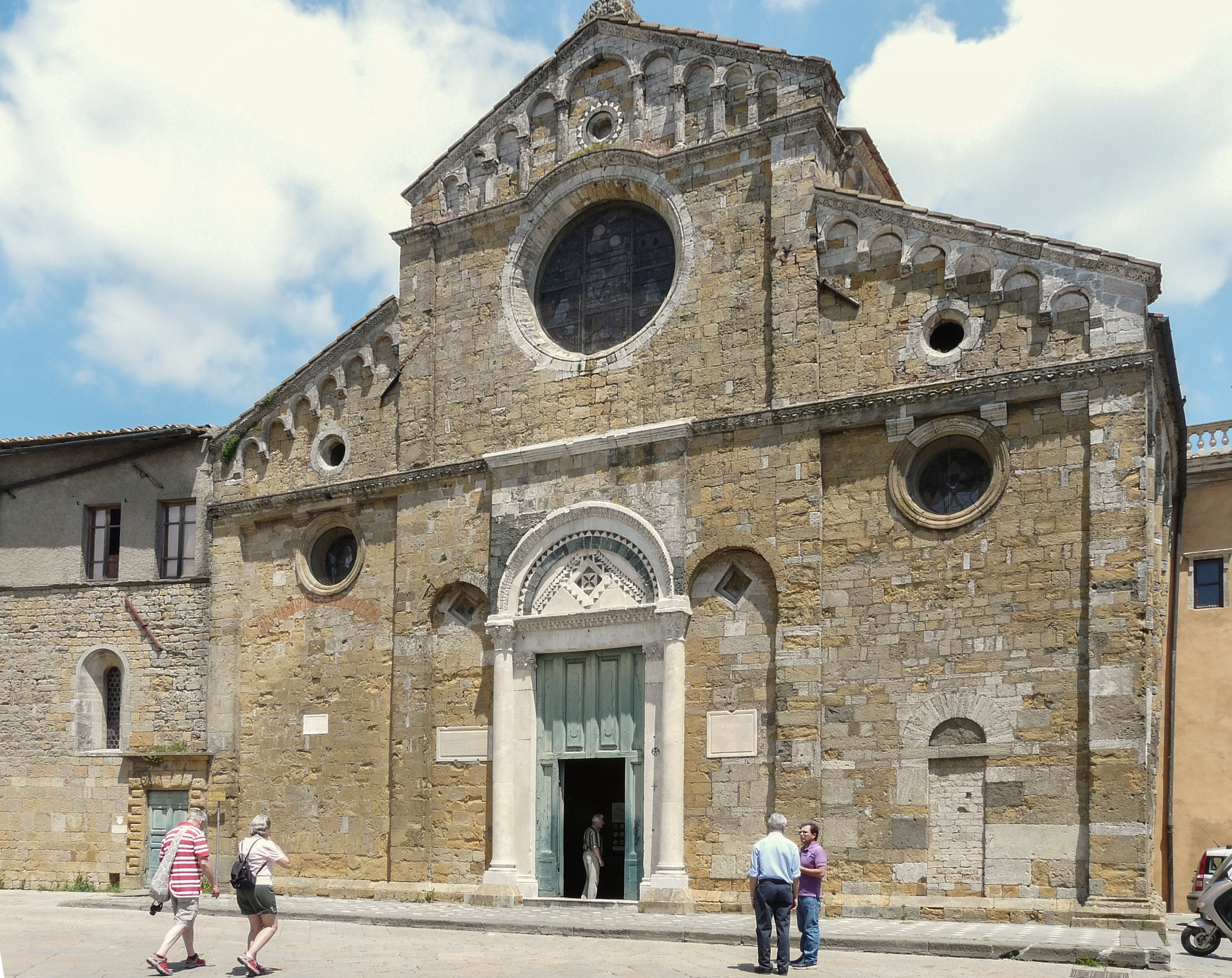

Religion
- Affiliation: Roman Catholic
- Province: Pisa

Location
- Location: Volterra, Italy
- Interactive map of Volterra Cathedral

Architecture
- Type: Cathedral Church
- Style: Romanesque
- Groundbreaking: 12th century

Volterra Cathedral (Italian: Cattedrale di Santa Maria Assunta, or Duomo di Volterra) is a Roman Catholic cathedral in Volterra, Italy, dedicated to the Assumption of the Virgin Mary. It is the seat of the bishop of Volterra.

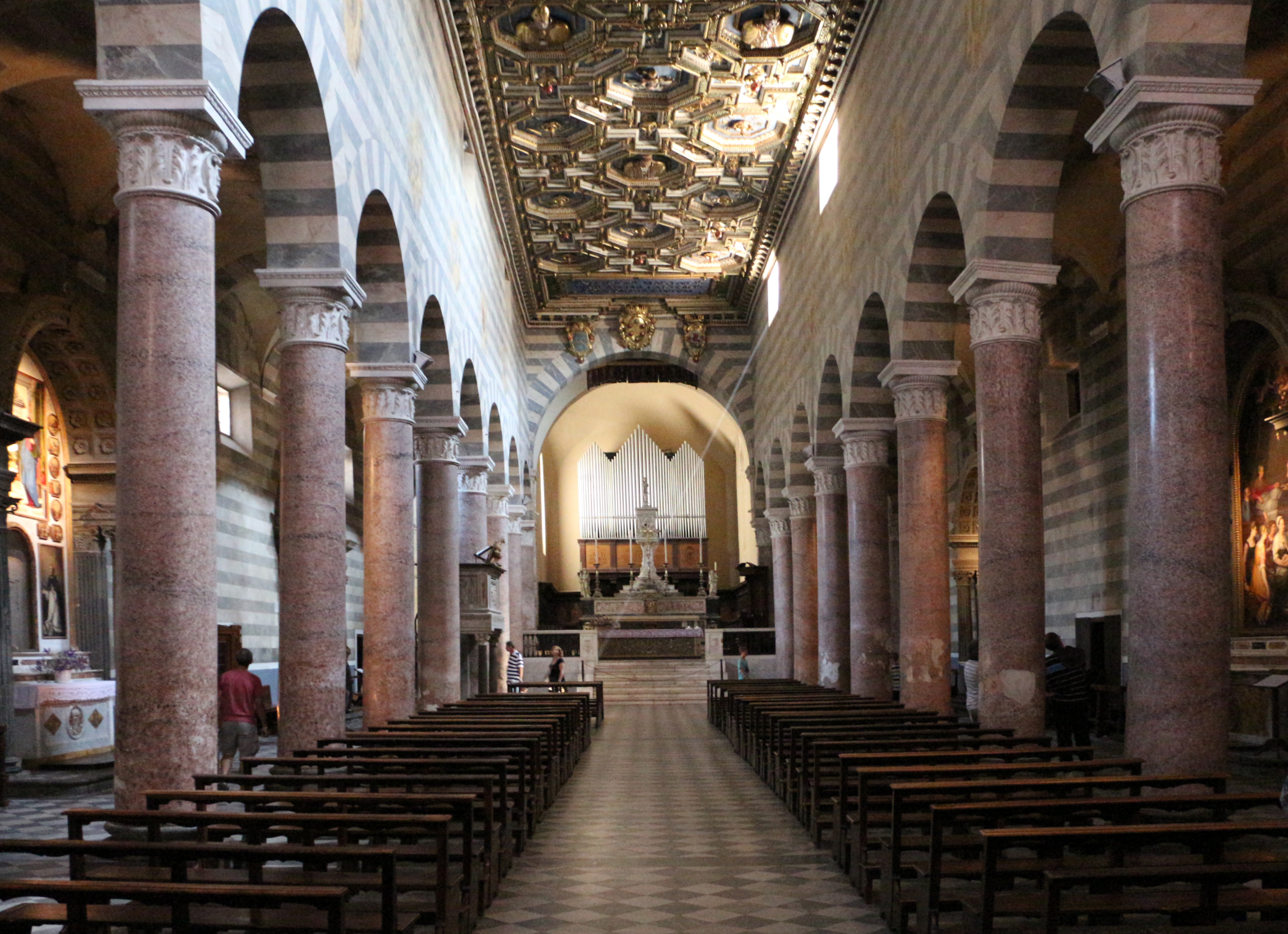
Interior looking east

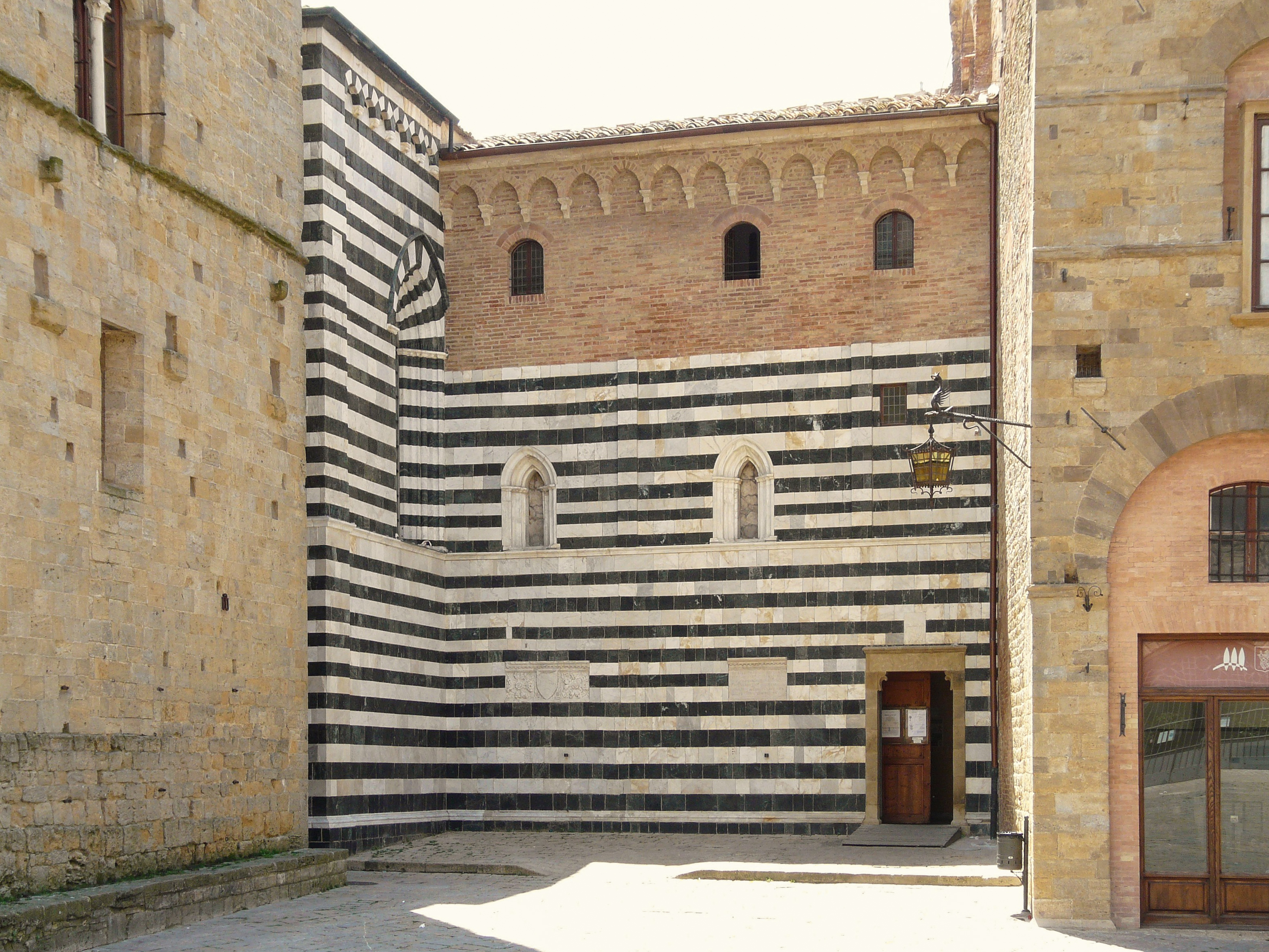
The Exterior is only partly cladded with typically Tuscan bands of alternating white and green marble

== History ==
The present church was rebuilt after the earthquake of 1117 that destroyed most of the town, and consecrated by Pope Calixtus II in 1120. Details of the earlier church on the site are not clear, although a church dedicated to Saint Mary is known from the 9th century. This was not the original cathedral, which was dedicated to Saint Peter and located next to the bishop's palace; it was destroyed by the Florentines during a siege in 1472, after which the bishop's seat was transferred to the present cathedral.

Nicola Pisano is said to have been involved in further reconstruction in the mid 13th century. The rustic stone façade was built in Romanesque style using spolia from the Roman theater of Volterra in the portal. The intarsia over the door is attributed to Pisano.

In 1580, bishop Guido Serguidi, with the approval of Ferdinando I de' Medici, Grand Duke of Tuscany, commissioned the decoration of the intricately coffered ceiling of the nave and crossings, designed by Francesco Capriani, carved by Jacopo Pavolini, and gilded by Fulvo della Tuccia. The ceiling has sculpted reliefs of Saints Ugo, Giusto, Pope Linus, Clemente, Attinea, and Greciniana, round a central symbol of the Holy Spirit. The campanile of 1493 replaced an older belltower.

=== Interior ===
The elongated nave and interior space form a Latin cross. The nave spans 22 columns decorated with stucco simulating rose-colored granite. Much of the interior was restored in 1842-1843. The stucco capitals were completed in the 16th century by Giovanni Paolo Rossetti and Leonardo Ricciarelli. In the 19th century, the walls of the interior were painted in stripes that suggest typical Tuscan decorative church architecture. The floor has tiles of alternating dark and white marble.

Ciborium and one of the angels by Mino da Fiesole (1471)

The pulpit has three reliefs depicting the Last Supper, the Annunciation, and the Sacrifice of Isaac, and the lions at the base of the columns are undoubtedly 12th-century works of the Guglielmo school, perhaps carved by the Pisan sculptor Bonamico. Other elements and the alabaster intarsia were added in 1584, when an earlier balustrade was dismantled and the pulpit was reconstructed.

To the left of the entrance is the funeral monument of Francesco Gaetano Incontri, former archbishop of Florence, who died in 1781. The monument was erected in 1840, with a bust by Aristodemo Costoli and decoration by Mariano Falcini. Below the monument are eight marble intarsia panels, originally part of a 12th-century Tuscan balustrade.

The main altar, mainly dating from the 19th century, has a marble ciborium with flanking angels (1471) by Mino da Fiesole. The choir stalls were completed in the 14th century. In the ceiling of the crossing are depictions of God the Father and Stories of the Life of the Virgin (1585) above the choir by Niccolò Circignani.

== Chapels ==
In the first chapel, the Chapel of Saint Ottaviano, the relics of this saint are kept in a marble sarcophagus to the right of the altar, sculpted by Raffaello di Andrea Cioli. It was commissioned in 1522 to thank the saint for his intervention in stopping an epidemic of the plague; the candle holders depicting angels are by Andrea Ferrucci.

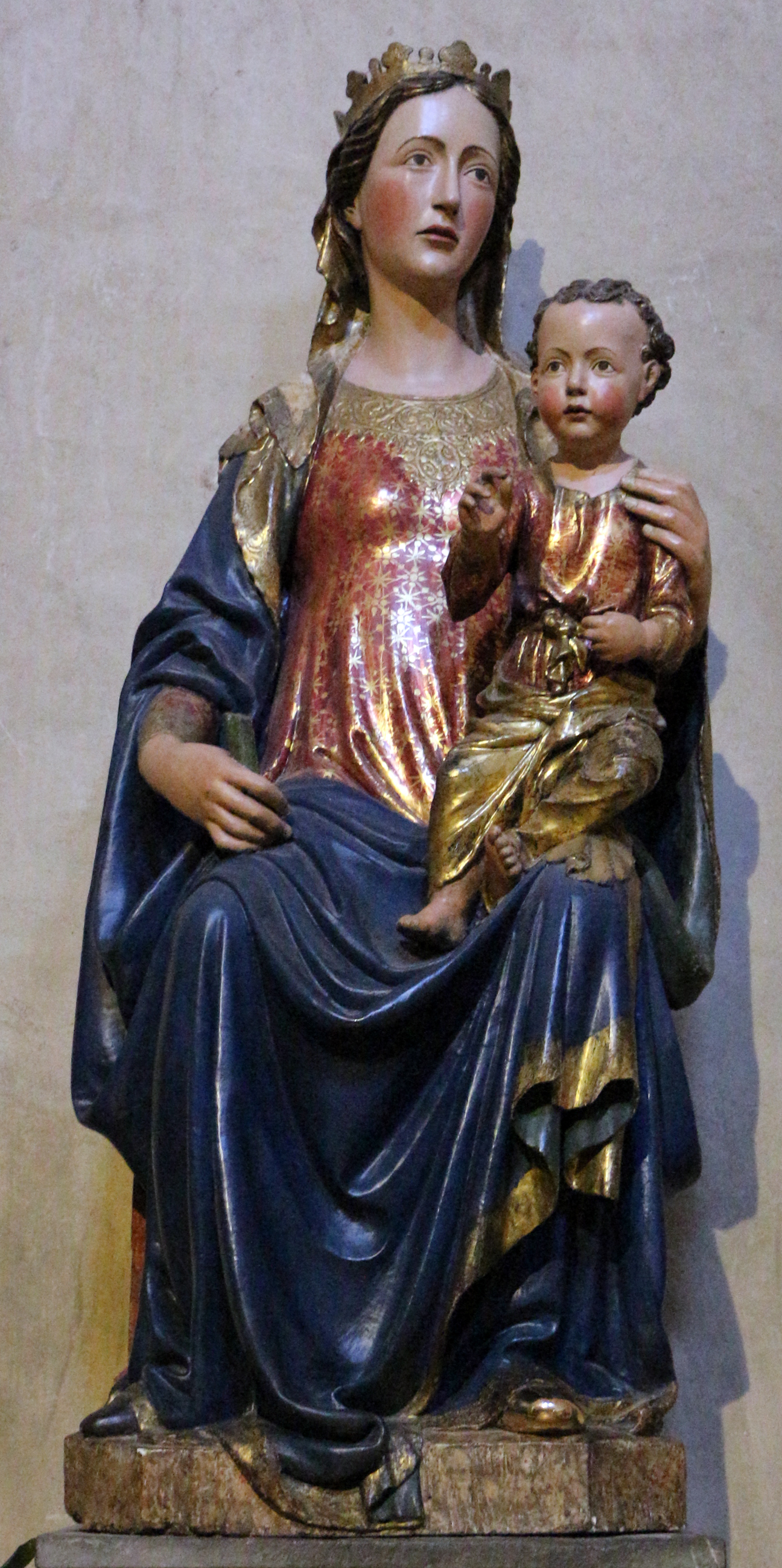
Francesco di Valdambrino, Madonna dei Chierici (early 15th ct.)

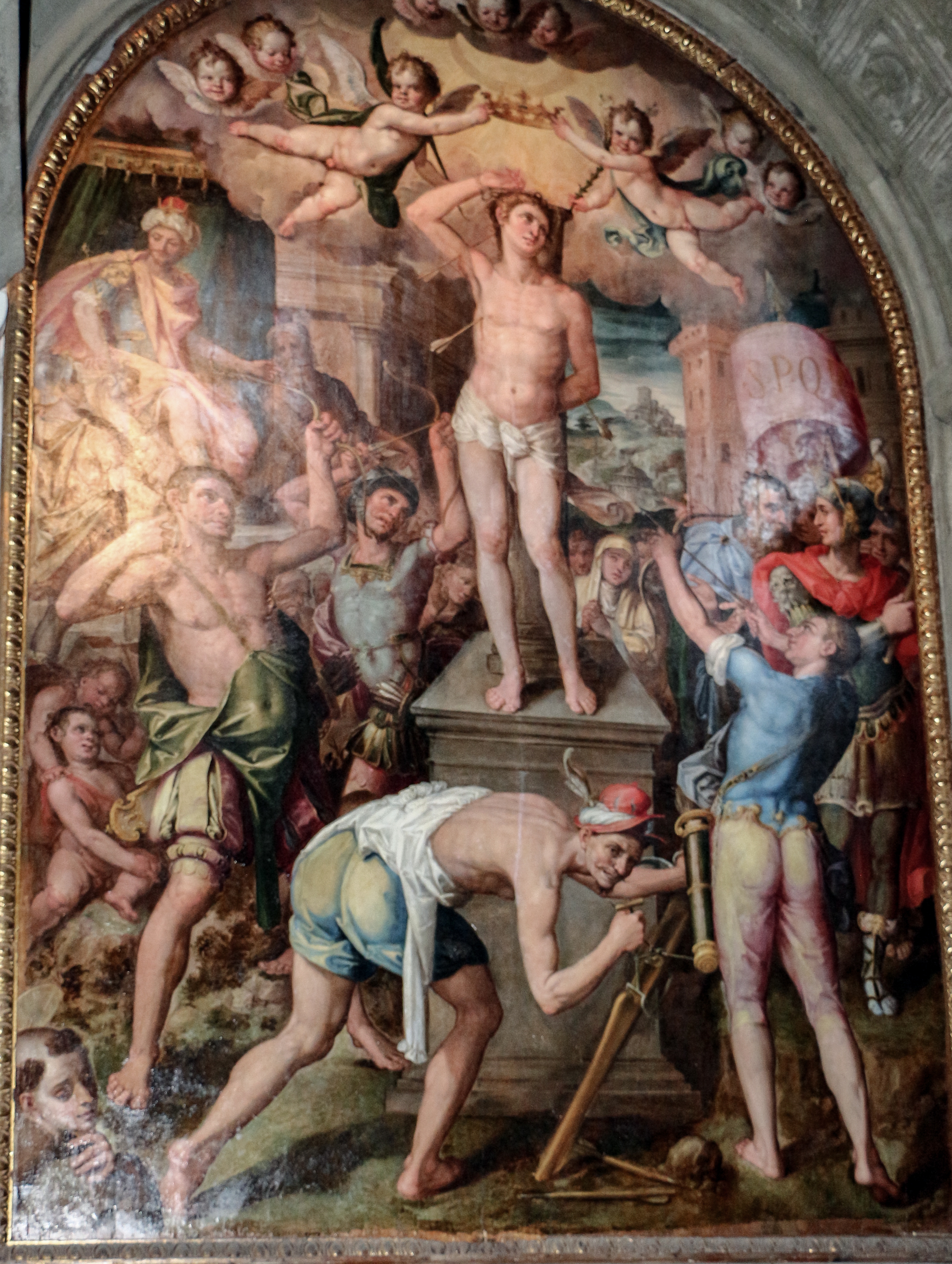
Francesco Cungi, Martyrdom of St. Sebastian (1587)

To the left is the chapel commissioned by Ludovico Incontri in 1645. Its marble sarcophagus holds the remains of Saint Ugo dei Saladini, a 12th-century bishop of Volterra.

The next chapel is the Chapel of the Madonna dei Chierici, referring to a wooden icon of the Madonna, donated by Jacopo di Ciglio (known as il Barbialla), and carved by Francesco di Valdambrino (early 15th century).

The Chapel of Saint Paul opens off the north transept. This chapel was commissioned by the Inghirami family, built for Admiral Jacob Inghirami, and designed by Alessandro Pieroni. The admiral, in a scene including the Baptistery of Volterra, appears in conversation in the lunette of the Procession to Damascus above the altar. Giovanni Mannozzi (Giovanni di San Giovanni) painted the frescoes of the Life of Saint Paul on the ceiling. On the walls, are paintings of The Mission of St. Paul in Damascus by Matteo Rosselli and the Beheading of St. Paul (1623) by Domenichino. Above the door to the rectory hangs a canvas of The Immaculate Conception with Saints by Cosimo Daddi. Other artists that contributed to the decoration include Gherardo Silvani, Giovanni Caccini, and Francesco Curradi.

Along the north side of the nave is the Chapel of St. Sebastian with a painting by Francesco Cungi of the Martydom of St Sebastian (1587).

The cathedral contains the funeral monument of the humanist bishop of Cavaillon, Mario Maffei, who died in Volterra in 1537. The figure of the prelate dressed in his finery in a sleeping pose on the sarcophagus was executed by Giovanni Angelo Montorsoli, one of Michelangelo's assistants.

The Oratory of the Virgin Mary (Cappella dell'Addolorata) contains a fresco of the Nativity with a Journey of the Magi by Benozzo Gozzoli on the left and an Epiphany on the right. Glazed terracotta figures, almost life-size, have recently been attributed to Giovanni della Robbia.

The Chapel of the Holiest Name of Jesus has an architectural 16th-century frame preserving the monogram of Christ donated to Volterra by San Bernardino of Siena encased in a precious silver 18th-century shrine. It also contains an Annunciation (1497) by Fra Bartolomeo della Porta.

The Verani Chapel contains an Immaculate Conception (1586) painted by Niccolò Circignani. The Chapel of the Annunciation contains an Annunciation by Albertinelli in collaboration with Fra Bartolomeo who painted the angel in the canvas in 1497.

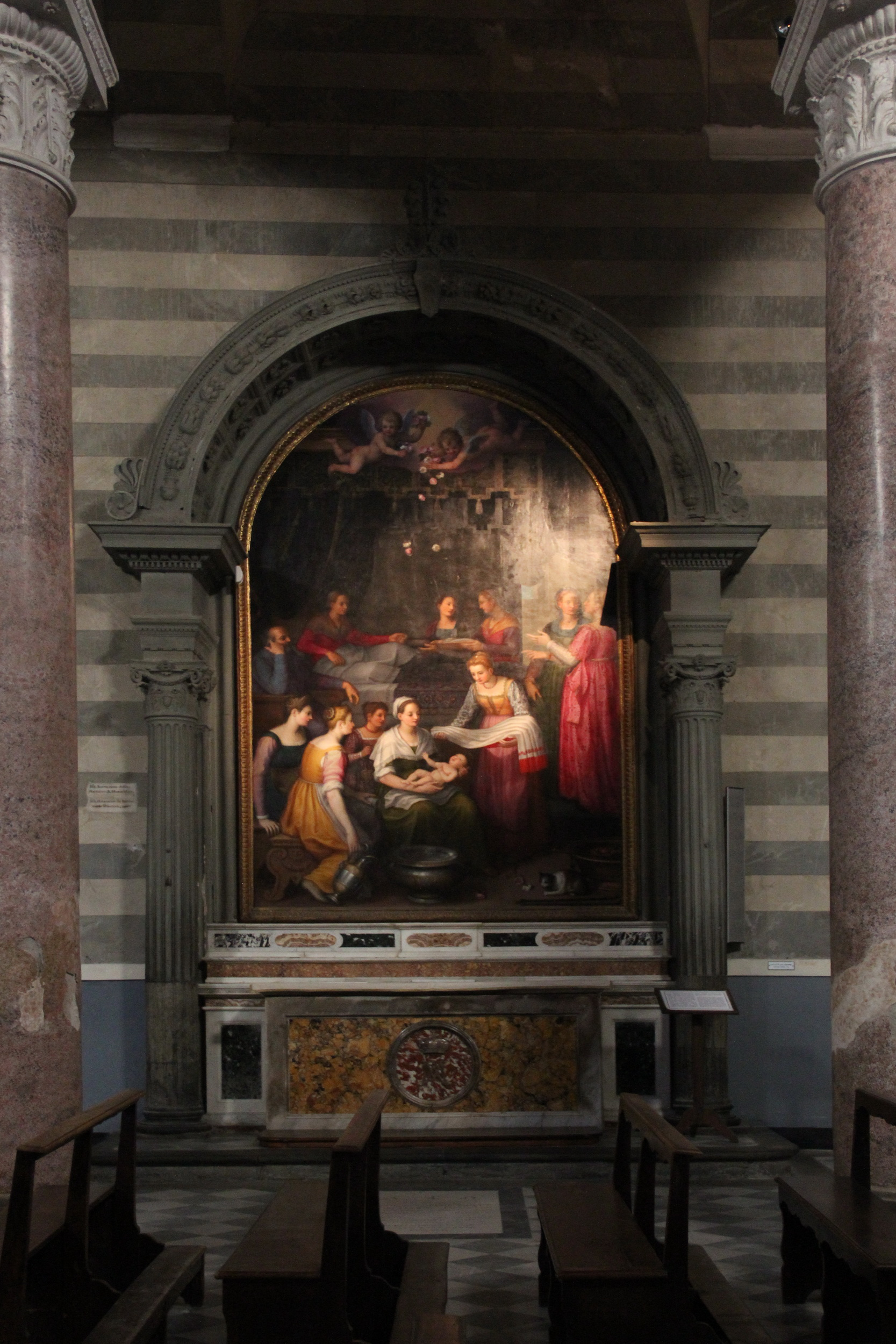
Francesco Curradi, Birth of the Virgin (1618) in an architectural Renaissance framework

The first chapel to the right of the entrance, the Giorgi Chapel, has an altarpiece by Pieter de Witte, depicting the Offering of Volterra to Virgin and Saints (1587) commissioned by Captain Francesco del Bovino of the Giorgi family who appears in the left-hand corner of the painting. The second chapel to the right, the Collaini Chapel, has a Birth of the Virgin (1618) by Francesco Curradi, and the third chapel to the right, the Perissi Chapel, a Presentation in the Temple of the Virgin (1590) by Gianbattista Naldini.

Over the door of the Chapel of San Carlo is a painting of the Crucifixion with the Virgin, Saints John, Anthony Abbot, Francis and Augustine 1611) painted by Curradi. Above the altar is a canvas of the Ecstasy of St Carlo Borromeo before the Virgin by Jacopo Chimenti, and on the side walls Saint Mary Magdalene of Scolaro by Guido Reni and an Immaculate Conception by Francesco Brini.

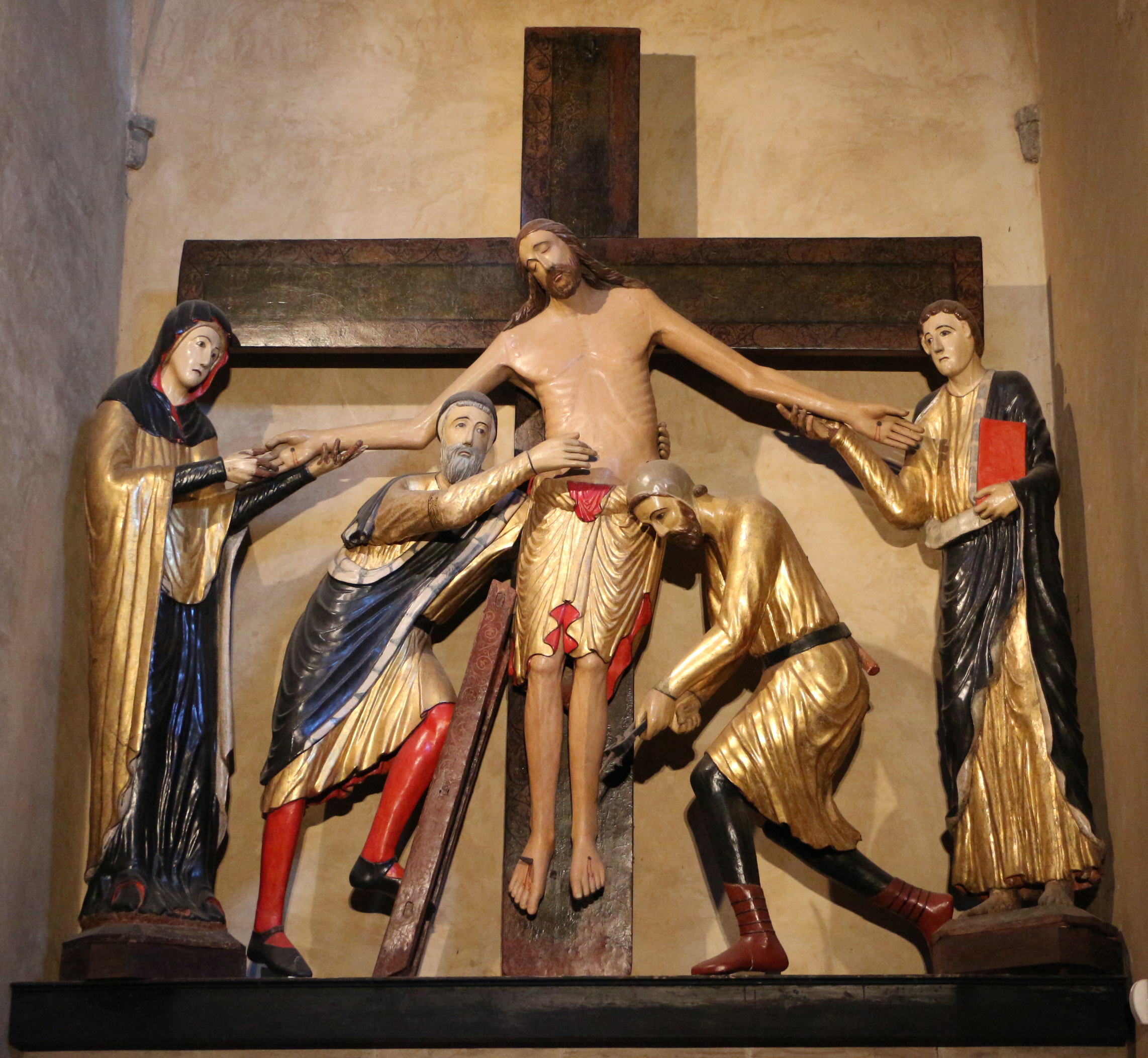
Wooden sculpture of the Deposition of Christ, Tuscan, c. 1228

Off the south transept is the entrance to the Serguidi Chapel (1595), previously the Chapel of the Holiest Sacrament, or Chapel of the Miracles, the design of which is attributed to Vasari. It was decorated in stucco by Leonardo Ricciarelli and painted by Giovanni Balducci. The cost of the decoration was more than ten thousand ducats. Above the altar is a wooden panel of the Resurrection of Lazarus (1592) by Santi di Tito. On the side walls are two paintings on canvas, also by Balducci: Expulsion of the Non-believers from the Temple and Parable of the Loaves and Fishes (1591). Balducci also painted the frescoes on the ceiling and to either side of the altar. Agostino Veracini painted the Patron Saints of Volterra (1741) featured on the walls. The altar has relics of Saints Attinia and Greciana.

The Chapel of the Deposition has a group of five wooden polychrome figures representing the Deposition of Christ executed in 1228 by an unknown Volterran artist.

The rectory stalls are the work of Francesco del Tonghio and Andreoccio di Bartolomeo, while the fine 15th-century intarsia on the bishop’s throne and the chaplain's benches are the work of unknown Tuscan masters.

== Sources ==
- City hall entry about the Cathedral
- Guida di Volterra, 1903, pages 85–100
