= Giovanni Maria Ciocchi =

Italian painter (1658–1725)

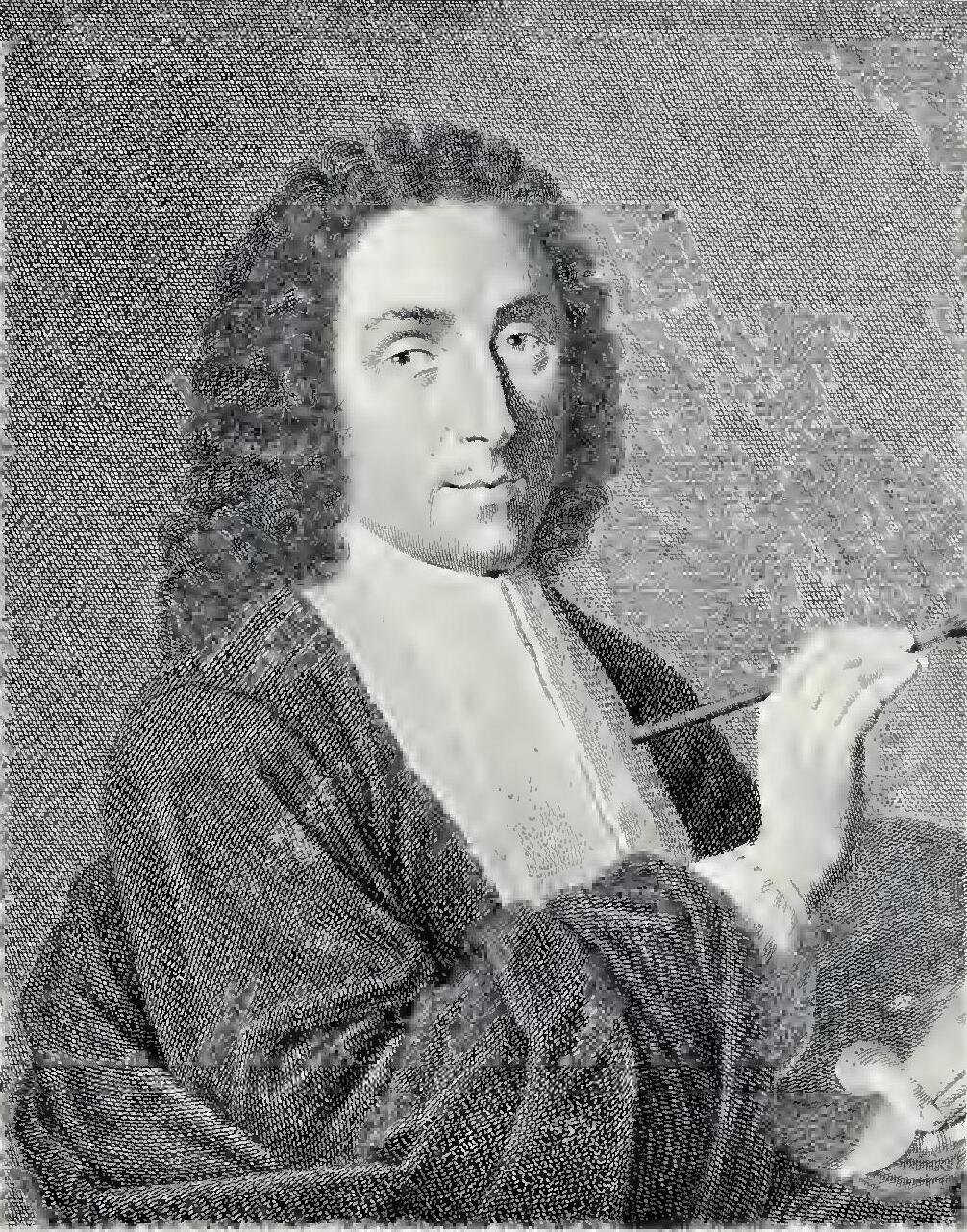
- Born: 1660
- Died: 1725 (aged 64–65)
- Occupation: Painter, writer, musician
- Parent(s): Clemente Ciocchi

Giovanni Maria Ciocchi (Florence, 23 March 1658 - Florence, 1725) was an Italian painter and art critic, active during the Baroque period. He was born into a family of artists, and it is not clear if he is related to Giovanni Maria Ciocchi del Monte (1487 – 1555) from Perugia, who became Pope Julius III. it is not clear that Giovanni Maria is related to the 16th century painter Ulisse Ciocchi.

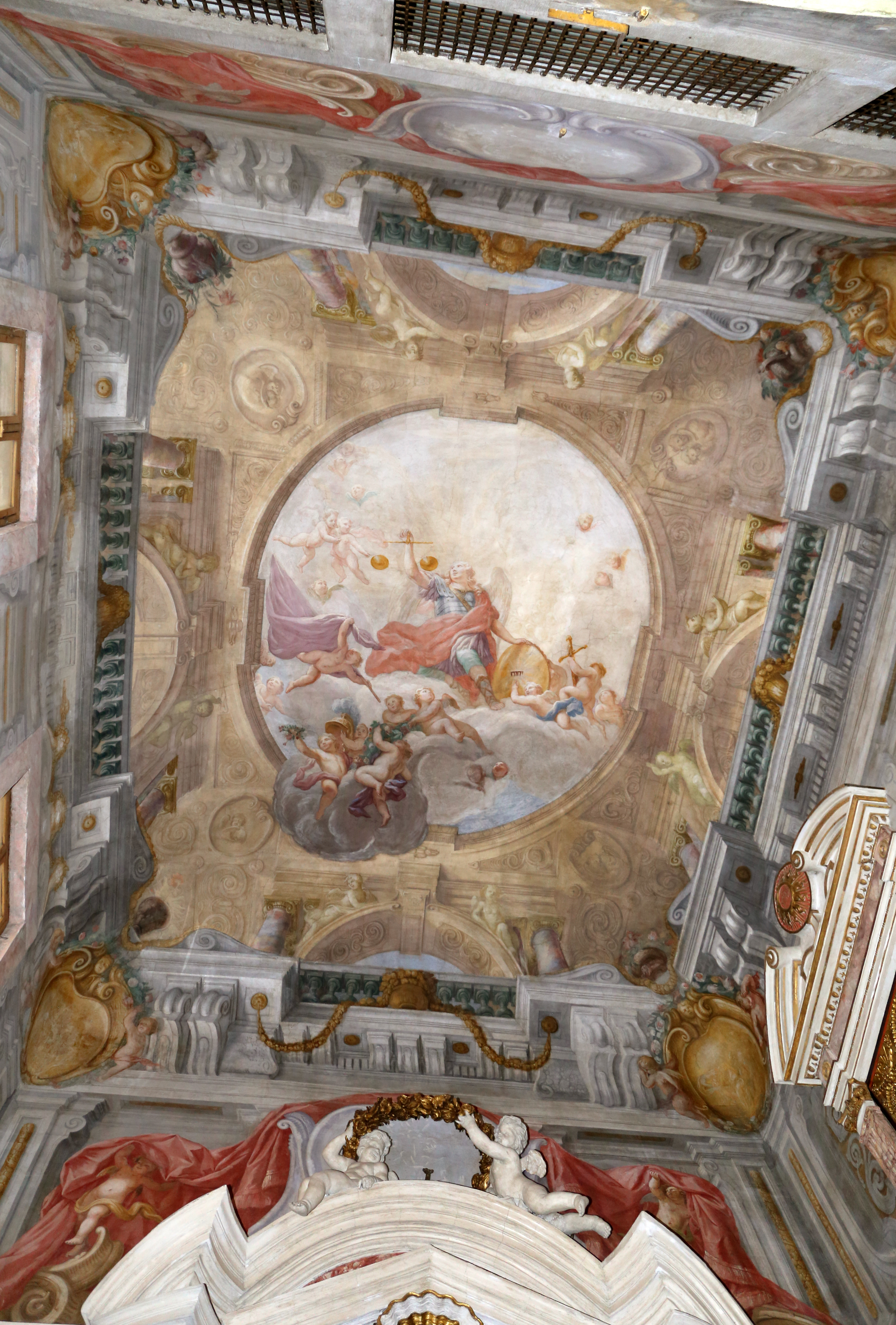
Ceiling of Santa Maria degli Angiolini, Florence.

== Biography ==
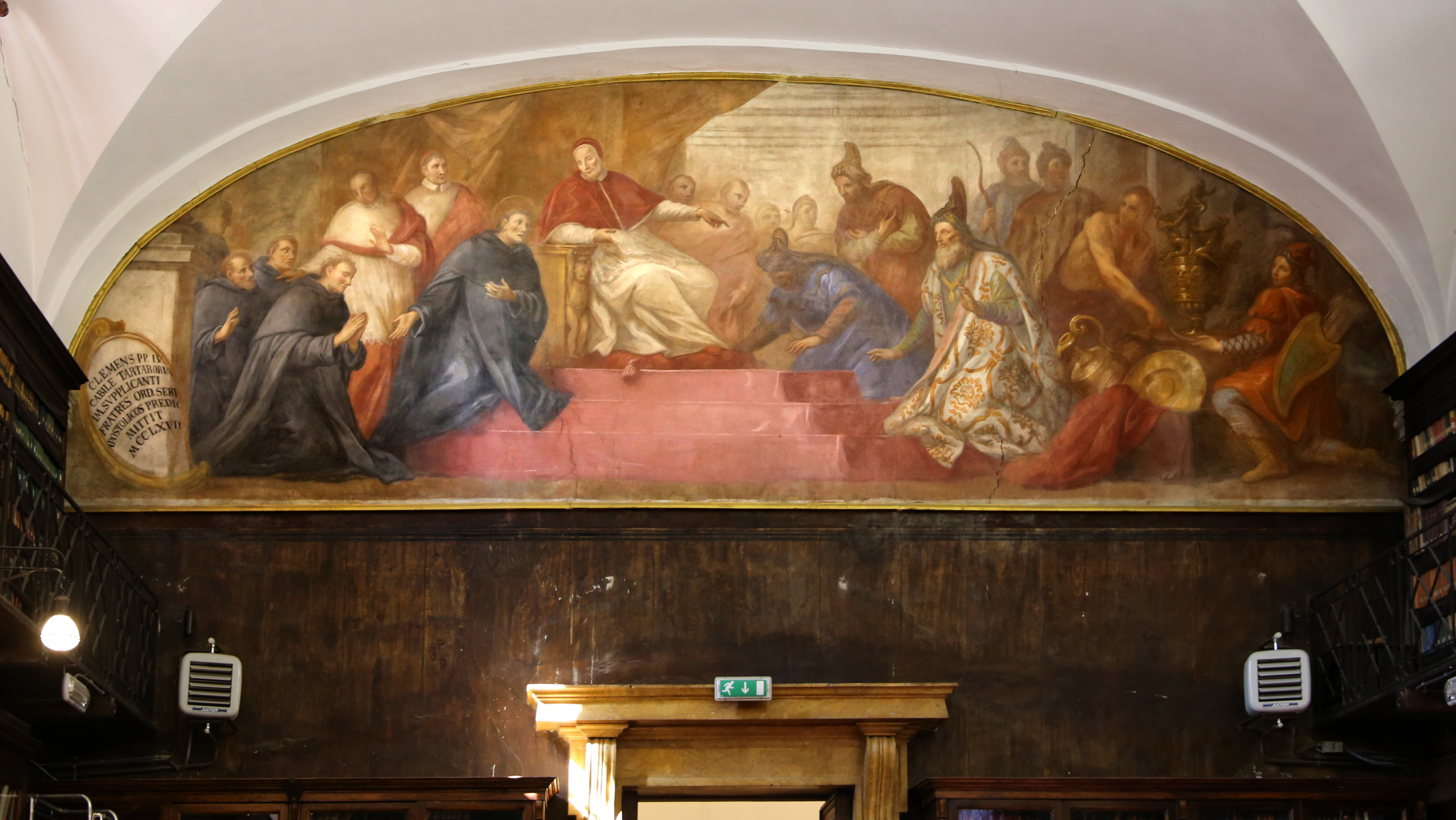
Pope Clemens IV meets the Servants of Mary Order friars as the king of the Tartarts is visiting, 1700-1710 ca., Istituto Geografico Militare library, Florence

Giovanni Maria, was the second son of Clemente, a sculptor in Florence. His older brother Michele, was a building engineer, and Michele's son, Giovanni Filippo (died 1770), was an architect. Giovanni Maria trained under his brother-in-law, Pier Dandini. In the Florentine tradition, who gave great weight to prior masters, Giovanni was engaged in making copies of works in the ducal courts of Italy, including travels to Venice, Parma, Modena, Rome, and Naples. Francesco Maria Gabburri said of Giovanni Maria that during his travels to the latter two cities, he did also create works of his own design. In 1705, Giovanni Maria became a teacher at the Academy of the Art of Design of Florence.

He completed the frescoes in the ceiling of the church of Santa Maria degli Angiolini, Florence, depicting St Michael Archangel in Glory. He also painted two lunettes in the library of the convent of the Annunziata. He painted altarpieces for Santa Maria in Campo; for San Jacopo sopr'Arno, in the latter depicting a Christ appearing to St Anthony Abbot (circa 1709); and for the church of Santa Lucia dei Magnoli, depicting the Martyrdom of the Santa Lucia (circa 1712–15). He also frescoed stanza in the Palazzo Mansi of Lucca.

Late in life, Giovanni Maria went blind, and he wrote a book which discussed his ideas about art. La Pittura in Parnaso Published posthumously in 1725, the work was dedicated to Marquis Neri Guadagni. This work like his painting, and much of contemporary Florentine art, was an overly-erudite exercise in cultural analysis.

== Notes ==
- Engraving based on a self-portrait.
