= Ulisse Ciocchi =

Italian painter

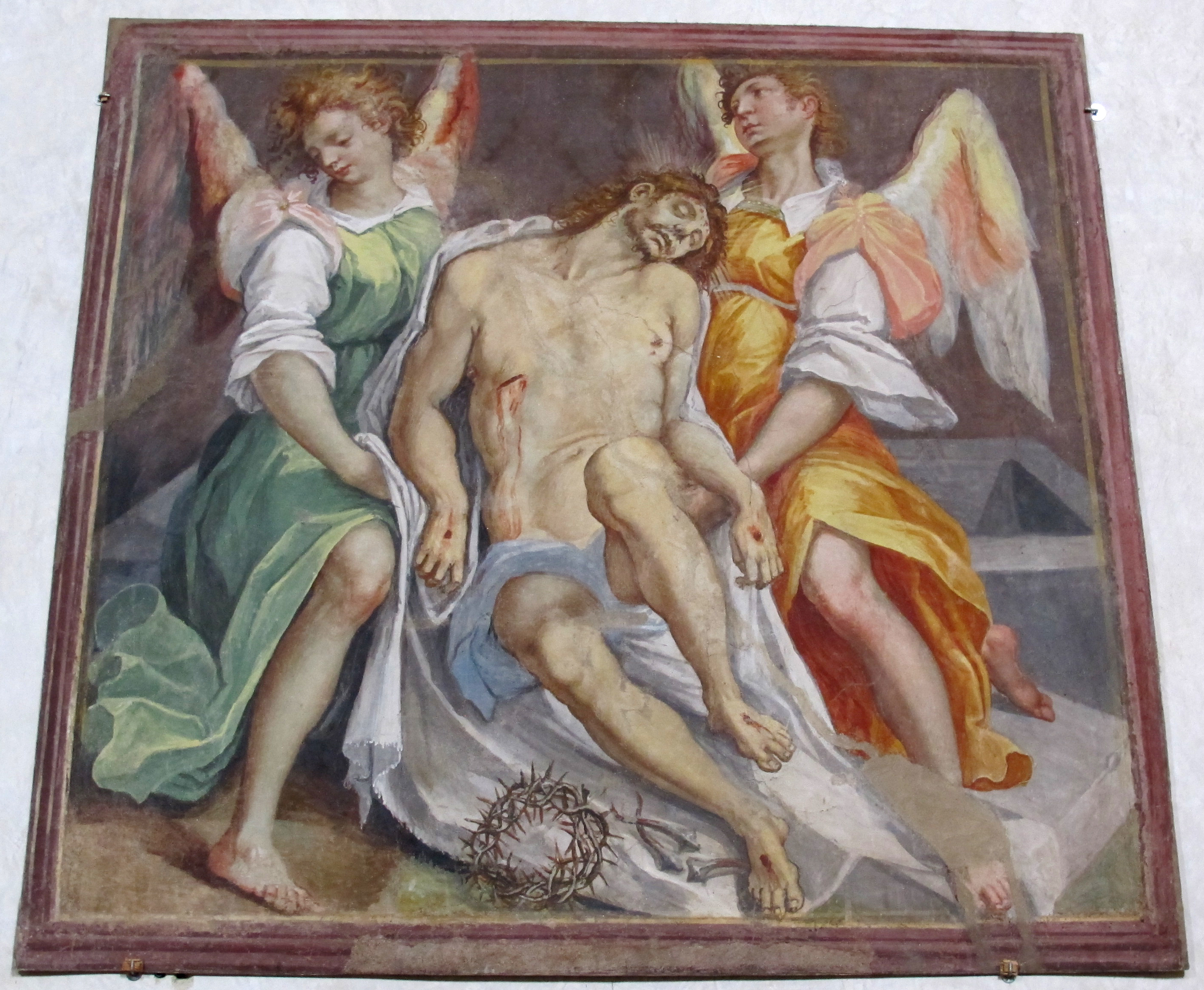
Deposition, 1610 ca., Monteoliveto, Florence

Ulisse Ciocchi or Ulisse Giocchi or Ulisse Giuocchi (c. 1570–1631) was an Italian painter in the mannerism style who was active in Florence.

Ciocchi was born in Monte San Savino near Arezzo. He painted in the convent of San Jacopo a Ripoli and Santo Spirito in Florence.

A Ulisse Ciocchi also painted the lunettes over the entrance to Santa Maria Novella, may have been Giovanni Maria Ciocchi's son.
