= Francesco di Valdambrino =

Italian sculptor

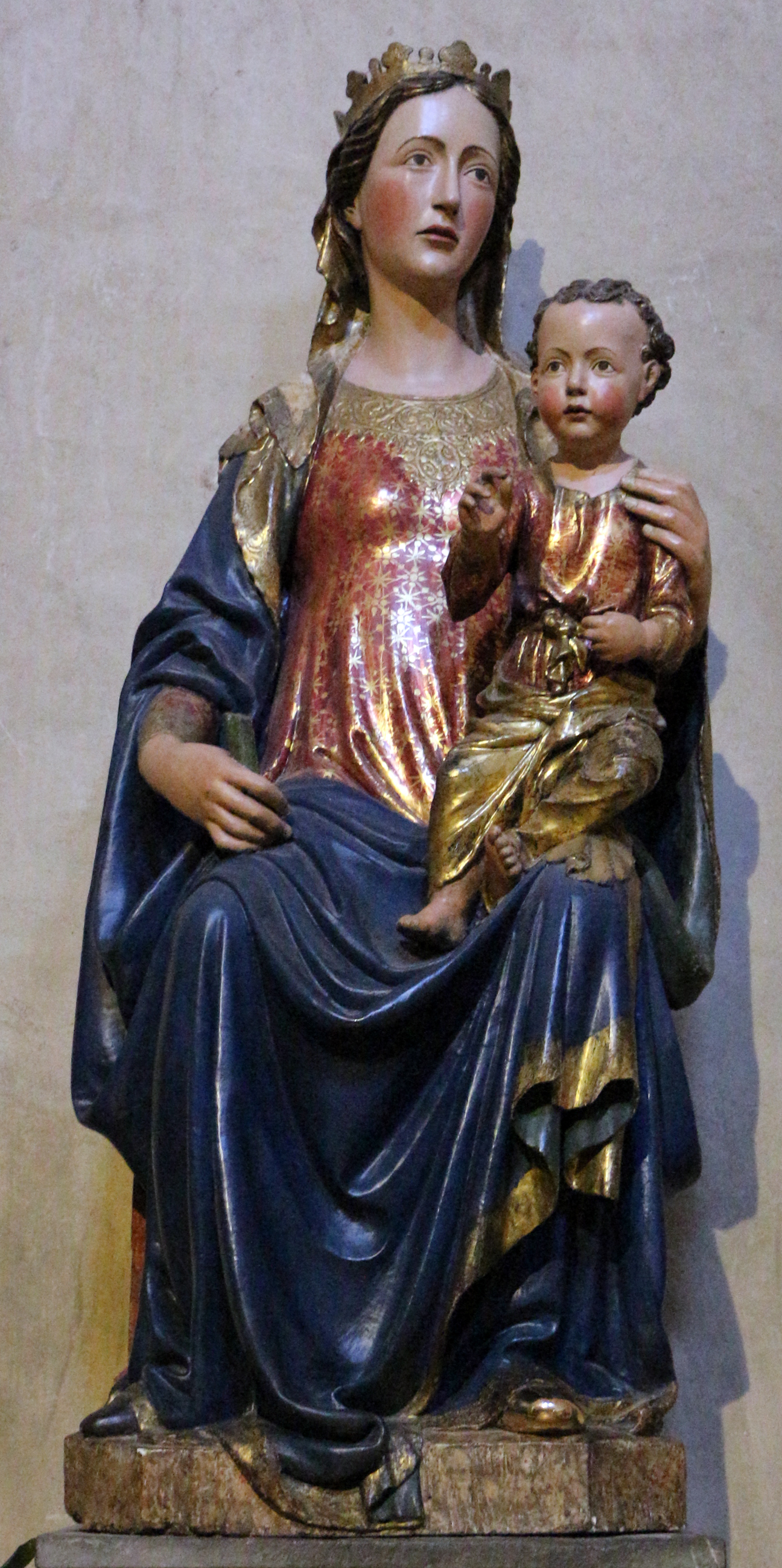
Madonna dei Chierici, in the Duomo di Volterra

Francesco di Valdambrino (c. 1375 – 1435) was an Italian sculptor in wood, active in Tuscany.

He was born near Siena. He was one of the contestants for the commission to decorate the doors of the Baptistery of Florence. He was a colleague of Jacopo della Quercia, and was influenced by Nino Pisano. Among his listed works are:

- Madonna dei Chierici, in the Volterra Cathedral
- St Crescenzo, St Savino, and St Vittore, (1409) from Duomo da Siena, now in Museo dell'Opera
- Annunciation (circa 1410–1411), Church of San Lorenzo, Asciano, now in Palazzo Corboli
- Child Jesus (1410-1415) now in Pinacoteca Nazionale, Siena
- San Pietro (1423) from Confraternita di San Pietro, Montalcino, now in Musei di Montalcino
- Crucifix (1410-1415) from church of Sant'Egidio, Montalcino, now in Musei di Montalcino
