= Raid on Bone =

1607 military engagement

The Raid on Bone was a hit and run operation by the Knights of Saint Stephen and Tuscan troops against the Algerian town of Bône in 1607.

470 Muslims were killed and 1,464-2,000 Muslims, both male and female, were enslaved and brought back to Tuscany. The Tuscans suffered just 47 casualties. The enterprise was the greatest amphibious operation completed by the Order of Saint Stephen.

== Bibliography ==
- Gemignani, Marco (1994). "La conquista di Bona". Società di Storia Militare. 2: 7–36.
