= Matteo Rosselli =

Italian painter (1578–1650)

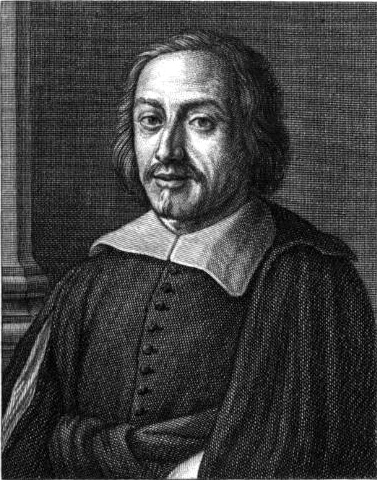
- Born: 10 August 1578; Florence, Italy
- Died: 18 January 1650 (aged 71)
- Known for: Painting
- Movement: Counter-Mannerism & Early Baroque

Matteo Rosselli (10 August 1578 – 18 January 1650) was an Italian painter of the late Florentine Counter-Mannerism and early Baroque. He is best known however for his highly populated grand-manner historical paintings.

== Biography ==
He first apprenticed with Gregorio Pagani. On 26 February 1599, he was inducted to the Accademia del Disegno, and in 1605 traveled to Rome to work with Domenico Passignano for six months.

He completed some frescoes on The Legend of the Origin of the Servite Order (1614–1618) in the Palazzo Pitti and in the Cloister of the Basilica della Santissima Annunziata; a Madonna and child with St Francis altarpiece for the Church of Santa Maria Maggiore in Florence; and an Adoration of the Magi (1607) for the Church of Sant'Andrea in Montevarchi. He painted a Crucifixion (1613) now in the parish church at Scarperia. He painted a Last Supper (1614) now in Conservatorio di San Pier Martire.

Upon the French monarch's death, he was commissioned two commemorative paintings of events in the life of Henry IV: his visit to Nantes and Gaudabec (1610). He also completed an Assumption (1613) for the church of San Domenico in Pistoia. He painted a number of frescoes for the Casa Buonarroti based on events of Michelangelo's life, including Fortifications of San Miniato (1615) and two others (1627 and 1628), all commissioned by his nephew, Michelangelo Buonarroti the younger.

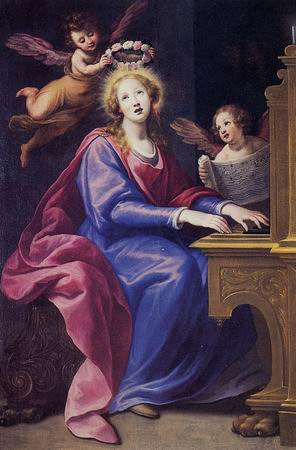
Matteo Rosselli, Santa Cecilia (1615-20)

In 1621, he was commissioned to paint a Triumph of David for the Pitti Palace, and a Lot and his Daughters and Tobias and Angel for the Galleria Corsini in Florence. Further decorations (1622–1623) were commissioned by Leopoldo de' Medici for the Casino di San Marco: Frederick II rebuilds the Port of Livorno and the Capture of Ippona (Florence, Corte d'Assise). Leopoldo also commissioned from Rosselli a series of allegorical paintings (1622) for the Sala della Stufa in Palazzo Pitti.

He frescoed in reception rooms of the Villa di Poggio Imperiale with scenes portraying European emperors amid biblical and historical scenes (1619–1623). He painted a Madonna of the Rosary (1649) for the Cathedral of Pietrasanta and a canvas of the Mission of St Paul in Damascus (frame by Nero di Porta Venere), for the Duomo of Volterra. The largest collection of Rosselli drawings is contained within the Louvre Museum, Paris, with many being preliminary sketches for other works.

Among his many pupils were Baldassare Franceschini (il Volterrano), Lorenzo Lippi, Francesco Furini, Giovanni da San Giovanni (Giovanni Mannozzi), and Jacopo Vignali.

== Gallery ==
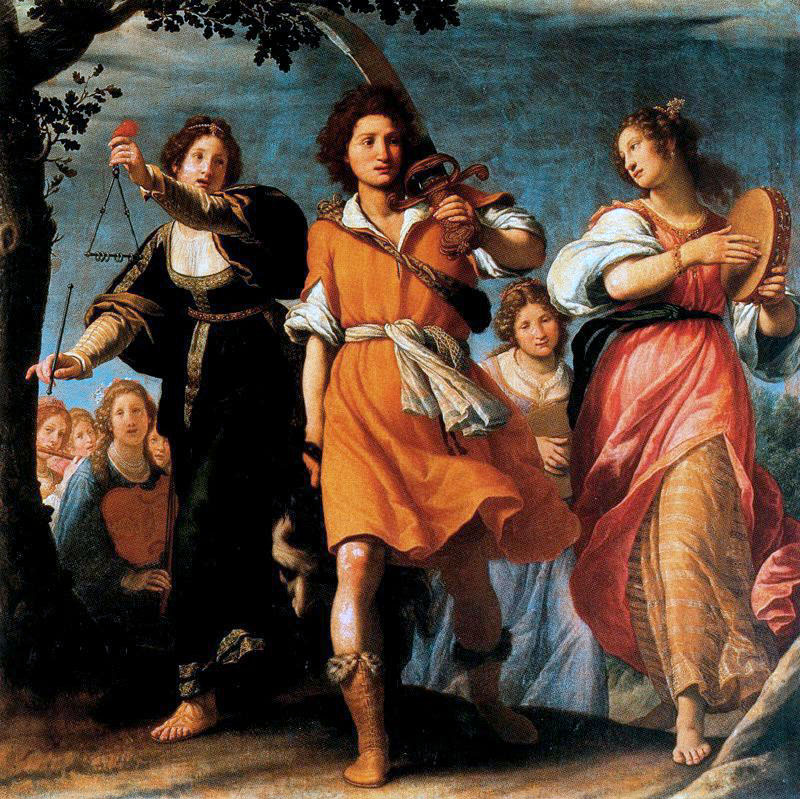
The Triumph of David, Palazzo Pitti, Florence

The Triumph of David, Louvre, Paris

Adoration of the Magi, San Lorenzo Collegiate Church, Montevarchi

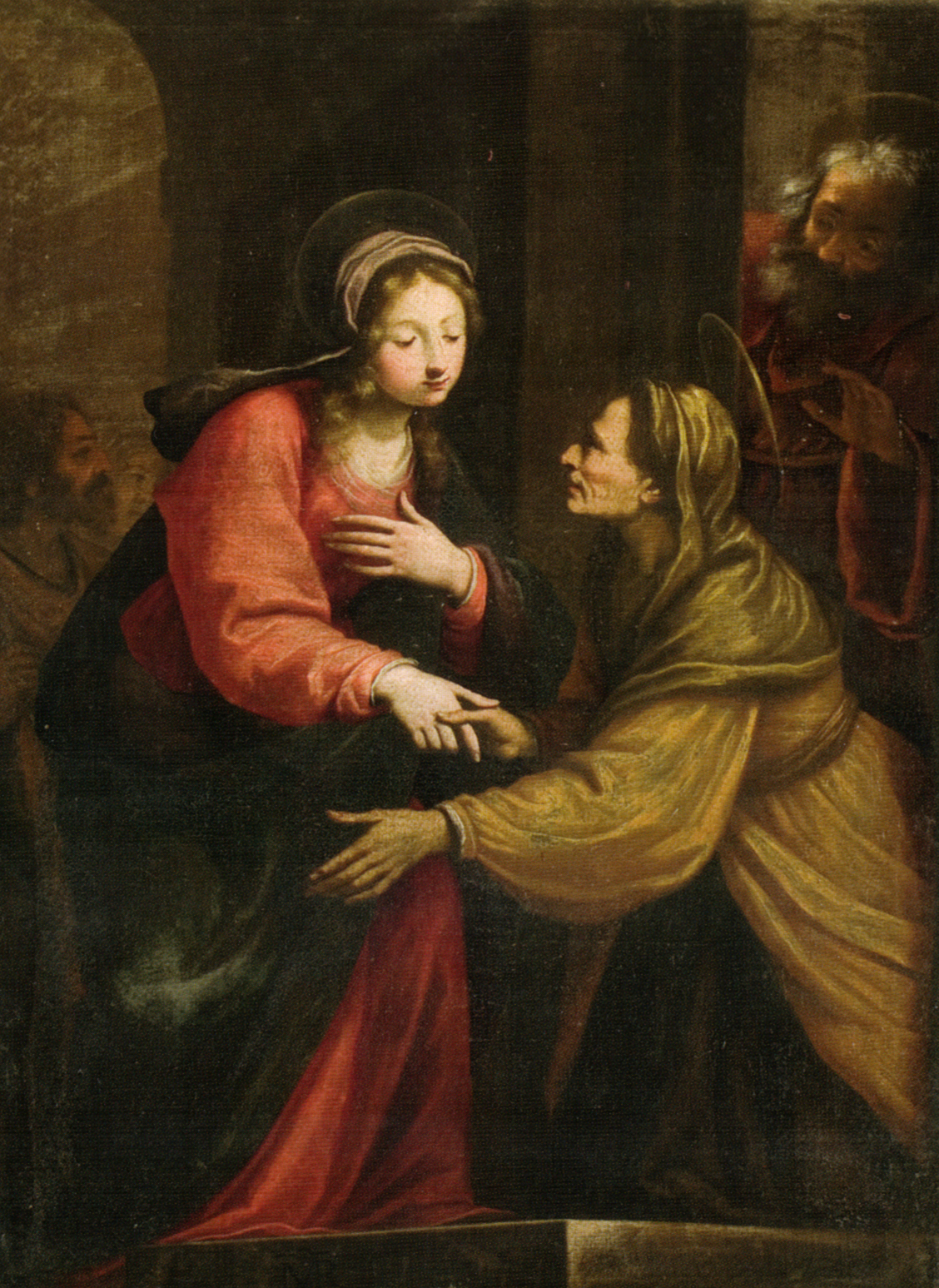
The Visitation, San Gaetano, Florence

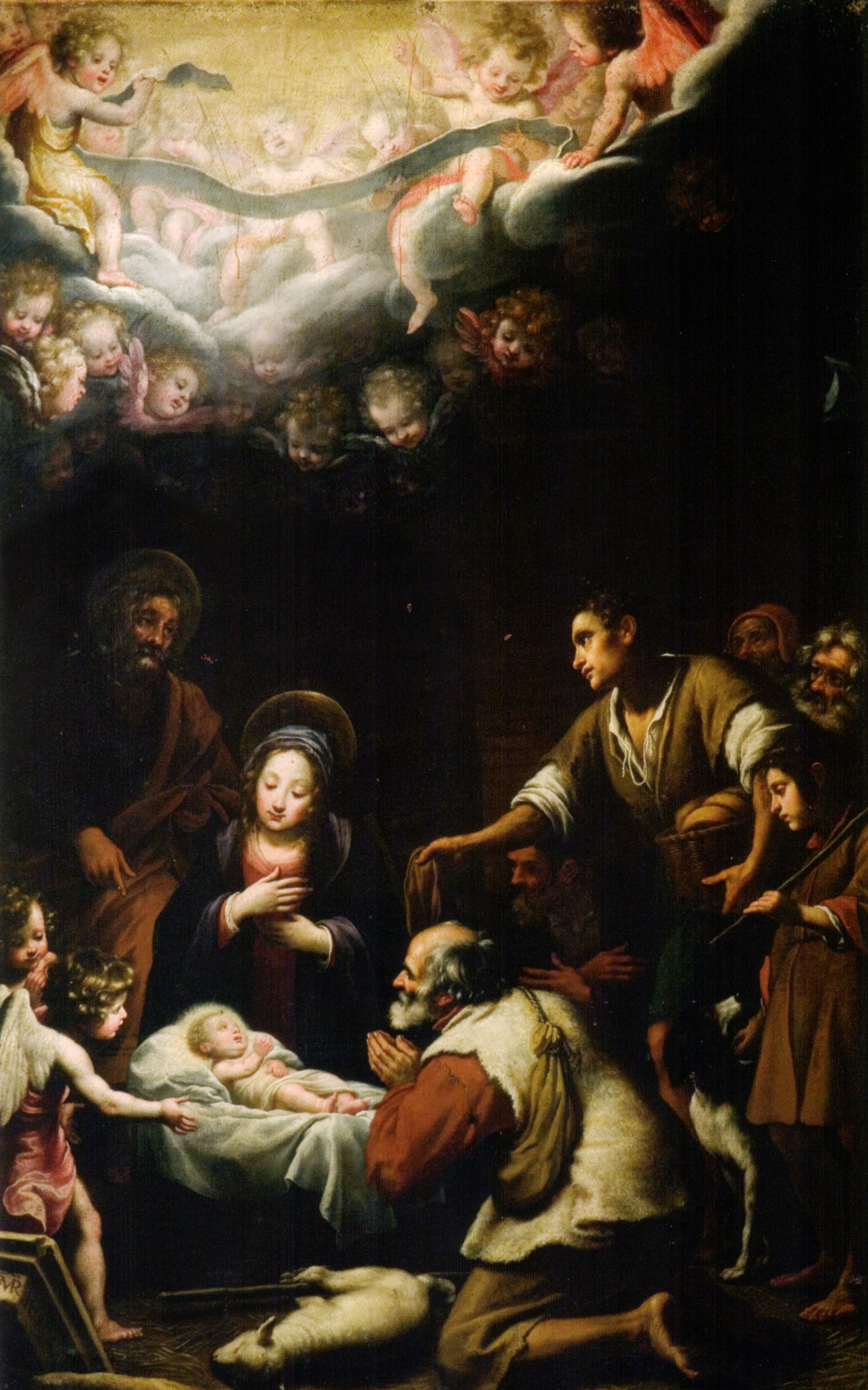
The Birth of Christ, San Gaetano, Florence

The Madonna and saints support an image of St. Dominic in Soriano, San Marco, Florence

Diana the Huntress, priv. col.

Gregorio Pagani and Matteo Rosselli, The Wedding at Cana, 1605–08, Museo Civico, Pistoia
