= Order of Saint Stephen =

Tuscan dynastic military order

Holy Military Order of St. Stephen Pope and Martyr
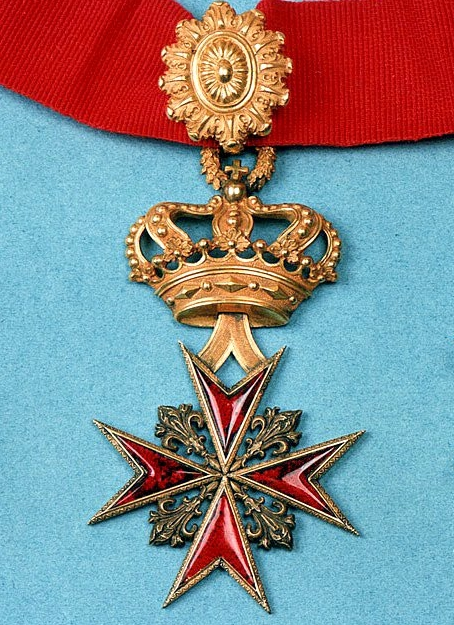
- Badge of the order

Awarded by Grand Duke of Tuscany
- Type: Military and Religious order
- Eligibility: Noblemen over 18, not descended from heretics
- Grand Master: Disputed (Note: The identity of the present Grand Master is regarded as disputed in published sources. The ICOC Register 2024 lists Archduke Sigismund of Habsburg-Lorraine as Grand Master. Several historians argue that the Tuscan Habsburg‑Lorraine line became extinct as a sovereign branch between 1866 and 1908 and that, under the papal bulls and imperial diplomas establishing Medici succession ad infinitum, the Medici of Ottajano therefore hold the dynastic claim.)

Precedence
- Next (higher): None (Highest)
- Next (lower): Order of Saint Joseph
- Ribbon of the order

The Order of Saint Stephen (officially Sacro Militare Ordine di Santo Stefano Papa e Martire, 'Holy Military Order of St. Stephen Pope and Martyr') is a Roman Catholic Tuscan military order founded in 1561. The order was created by Cosimo I de' Medici, first Grand Duke of Tuscany. The last member of the Medici dynasty to be a leader of the order was Gian Gastone de Medici in 1737. The purported dissolution of the order in 1859 by the provisional government of Tuscany to the Kingdom of Sardinia was in breach of canon law and had no effect on the status of the Order. The former Kingdom of Italy did not recognize the order as a legal entity, but today the Italian republic includes it among the non-national Orders for which permission may be given in the name of the president to wear the decorations in Italy.

== History ==
Cross of Saint Stephen

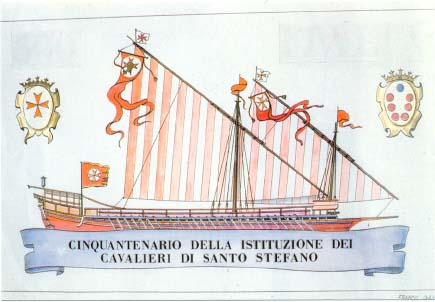
Galley of the Order of Saint Stephen (1611 celebrating drawing)

Flag of the galleys of the Order of Saint Stephen, 1562-end of XVIII century

The order was founded by Cosimo I de' Medici, first Grand Duke of Tuscany, with the approbation of Pope Pius IV on 1 October 1561. The rule chosen was that of the Benedictine Order. The first grand master was Cosimo himself and he was followed in that role by his successors as grand duke. The dedication to the martyred Pope Stephen I, whose feast day is 2 August, derives from the date of Cosimo's victories at the Battle of Montemurlo on 1 August 1537 and the Battle of Marciano (Scannagallo) on 2 August 1554.

The objective of the order was to fight the Ottoman Turks and the pirates that sailed Mediterranean Sea in the 16th century. The Turks and the pirates were making dangerous inroads on the coast of the Tyrrhenian Sea where Cosimo had recently inaugurated the new port of Livorno. Cosimo also needed a symbolic fight to unite the nobility of the different cities that combined to form his new grand duchy (including Florence and Siena), and to demonstrate his support of the Roman Catholic Church. Finally, the creation of a Tuscan military order would also strengthen the prestige, both internal and international, of Cosimo's new state.

In its early years, the Order took part successfully in the Spanish wars against the Ottomans, being present at the siege of Malta (1565), the Battle of Lepanto (1571) and the 1607 capture of Annaba in Algeria by the then admiral Jacopo Inghirami. They burned the city, killed 470 people and took 1,500 captives. After its aggressive capabilities had been recognized, the Order concentrated on the defence of the Mediterranean coasts against Turkish and African pirates. In particular, the Knights made some incursions into the Aegean Islands controlled by the Turks, and took part in the campaigns in Dalmatia, Negroponte and Corfu. The organization peaked in the early 17th century, when it counted 600 knights and 2,000 other soldiers, sailors, and oarsmen. Of the 3,756 knights who served in the organization between 1562 and 1737, 68 percent were Tuscans, 28 percent came from neighboring Italian states (mostly the Papal States), and 4 percent came from elsewhere.

After 1640, military involvement was reduced. The Order concentrated on the coastal defence and on ordnance duties, but did not avoid the chance to send help to the Republic of Venice, then engaged in a desperate war against the Ottoman Empire. The order's last military action dates from 1719. Grand Duke Peter Leopold of Tuscany promoted a reorganization of the order, turning it into an institute for education of the Tuscan nobility.

On 7 March 1791, six months after becoming Emperor, Leopold abdicated the grand duchy to his younger son, Ferdinand III, the founder of the present Grand Ducal House. Although Ferdinand was the first European sovereign to recognize the French Republic, he was forced to submit to the French authorities who occupied the grand duchy in 1799. He abdicated both the grand duchy and the Grand Magistery of Saint Stephen. The order survived during the short-lived Kingdom of Etruria. Following the restoration of Ferdinand III in 1814, the revival of the Order was proposed. By a decree dated 1815 the Ripristinazione dell'Ordine dei Cavalieri di S. Stefano was proclaimed. The Order was again dissolved in 1859, when Tuscany was annexed to the Kingdom of Sardinia.

== Currently ==
An attempt was made to suppress it during the Napoleonic era, on 9 April 1809, but Ferdinand III of Lorraine restored it on 22 December 1817, with some changes to the statutes. On the eve of the Unification of Italy, the Order consisted of 23 Bailiffs, 34 Priors, 49 Knights with family commenda, 177 Knights of Justice, 187 Knights Collatarii with commenda di Grazia and 12 authorised Collatarii without commenda, for a total of 482 members, in addition to the Grand Master and the Knights of the Grand Cross. Among the last illustrious members of the Grand Ducal period are Prince Colloredo-Mansfeld, the Marquises Malaspina, Emanuele Fenzi, Prince Andrea Corsini, Stanislao Grottanelli De Santi, the Princes Poniatowski, Count Francesco De Larderel, Alessandro Carega, the Counts della Gherardesca, the lawyer Ubaldo Maggi, the Count Demetrio Finocchietti, Cosimo Ridolfi, Giovanni Baldasseroni, Guglielmo De Cambray Digny, the lawyer Primo Ronchivecchi and the Count lawyer Luigi Fabbri.

The attempt to suppress the Order made in 1859, with the unification of Tuscany with the Kingdom of Sardinia, was limited to the confiscation of the Order's properties, since the Order of Saint Stephen, as a religious order founded "in perpetuity" directly by a Pope, could only be suppressed by a Papal Bull. On 20 December 1866, Ferdinand IV and his children returned to the authority of the Emperor as Austrian subjects, but the Tuscan line continued to be treated as a former sovereign branch; Ferdinand retained his right to award the Tuscan Orders and his title of Grand Duke, which continued to be accorded to him in the court almanach and the Almanach de Gotha while permission was given to Austrian subjects to accept and wear the Tuscan Orders.

Following the death of Grand Duke Ferdinand IV in 1908, Emperor Franz Joseph I no longer recognised the title of Grand Duke of Tuscany for his heir and permission was no longer given to wear the dynastic orders conferred by the Grand Dukes of Tuscany.

On 20 December 1866, Ferdinand IV and his children returned to the imperial family and the House of Tuscany ceased to exist as a sovereign branch, being absorbed by the Austrian imperial branch; Ferdinand IV was allowed to retain his fons honorum vita natural durante, while his children became only imperial princes (archdukes/archduchesses of Austria) and no longer princes/princesses of Tuscany. In 1870, Ferdinand IV renounced his political rights on the Grand Duchy of Tuscany in favour of Emperor Franz Joseph I of Austria. The successors of the last ruling Grand Duke haven't retained the title and the privileges of their predecessors. Despite the extinction of the Grand Magistery in 1908 with the death of Ferdinand IV, the last Grand Duke of Tuscany, and despite the renunciation of the dynastic rights of the Tuscan branch before 1961, in the years 1971–1972 one of his descendants, but not the eldest son, Gottfried, ignoring the renunciations of his grandfather Ferdinand IV and, at the same time, the authorization to confer the Tuscan dynastic Orders obtained personally by his grandfather, by Emperor Franz Joseph I and only and exclusively until the death of Ferdinand IV of Tuscany, which occurred in 1908, he resumed conferring the Order of Santo Stefano and the other Orders of Chivalry, already conferred by Ferdinando IV and his predecessors in the government of the Grand Duchy of Tuscany, under the direction of Giorgio Cucentrentoli. At the same time Goffredo himself made him Count of Monteloro: on September 22, 1971, Gottfried reconfirmed the continuity of the Orders. In reality it was a new foundation that copied part of the statutes and insignia of the old chivalric order, and could not even boast continuity in the grand magistry as the son of Ferdinand IV, Peter Ferdinand, Gottfried's father, never granted or claimed anything about the Tuscan chivalric orders.

== Eligibility ==
To join the Order a postulant had to be at least eighteen years of age, able to meet the financial obligations of membership, make the necessary noble proofs and not be descended from heretics. The initial seat of the order was on Elba before moving to Pisa. The Knights' Square in Pisa, on which their palace faces, is named after the Order. The Coat of Arms include a red cross with eight points, flanked by golden lilies.

== Knights of Grace ==
The following have been designated Knights of Grace of the Order of Saint Stephen:

- Alfred I, Prince of Windisch-Grätz
- Vincenzo Antinori
- Archduke Charles Stephen of Austria
- Ernst I, Duke of Saxe-Altenburg
- Ferdinand III, Grand Duke of Tuscany
- Archduke Franz Salvator of Austria
- Archduke Johann Salvator of Austria
- Archduke Joseph Ferdinand of Austria
- Archduke Karl Salvator of Austria
- Archduke Leopold Ferdinand of Austria
- Leopold II, Grand Duke of Tuscany
- Giovanni Pacini
- Archduke Peter Ferdinand of Austria
